= Lodi High School (New Jersey) =

High school in Bergen County, New Jersey, US

Location
- 99 Putnam Street; Lodi, Bergen County, New Jersey 07644; United States
- 40.887589°N 74.08684°W

Information
- Type: Public high school
- School district: Lodi Public Schools
- NCES School ID: 340885000550
- Principal: Michael Attanasio
- Faculty: 67.4 FTEs
- Grades: 9-12
- Enrollment: 906 (as of 2024–25)
- Student to teacher ratio: 13.4:1
- Colors: Royal Blue and Orange
- Athletics conference: North Jersey Interscholastic Conference
- Team name: Rams
- Website: lhs.lodinjschools.org

Lodi High School is a four-year comprehensive public high school that serves students in ninth through twelfth grade from Lodi, in Bergen County, in the U.S. state of New Jersey, operating as the lone secondary school of the Lodi Public Schools. The school is accredited by the Middle States Association of Colleges and Schools, with accreditation expiring in January 2030.

As of the 2024–25 school year, the school had an enrollment of 906 students and 67.4 classroom teachers (on an FTE basis), for a student–teacher ratio of 13.4:1. There were 455 students (50.2% of enrollment) eligible for free lunch and 111 (12.3% of students) eligible for reduced-cost lunch.

== History ==
Students from East Paterson (since renamed as Elmwood Park) had been sent to Lodi High School under a sending/receiving relationship until 1953 and then were shifted to East Rutherford High School starting in 1954 due to lack of capacity at the Lodi school, staying there until Elmwood Park Memorial High School opened in 1957. High School students from Little Ferry had attended the school until the 1953–54 school year, when the Little Ferry Public Schools shifted its students to Ridgefield Park High School. Students in ninth through twelfth grades from Saddle Brook had attended Lodi High School as part of a sending/receiving relationship until the new Saddle Brook High School opened in September 1958 for grades 7–10, with those in eleventh and twelfth grades continuing in Lodi until their graduation.

The school had also served students from Wallington, New Jersey. After the current Lodi High School was completed for the 1973–74 school year, the former high school building was repurposed as Thomas Jefferson Middle School.

== Awards, recognition and rankings ==
The school was the 278th-ranked public high school in New Jersey out of 339 schools statewide in New Jersey Monthly magazine's September 2014 cover story on the state's "Top Public High Schools", using a new ranking methodology. The school had been ranked 286th in the state of 328 schools in 2012, after being ranked 240th in 2010 out of 322 schools listed. The magazine ranked the school 219th in 2008 out of 316 schools. The school was ranked 199th in the magazine's September 2006 issue, which surveyed 316 schools across the state.

== Athletics ==
The Lodi High School Rams participate in the North Jersey Interscholastic Conference, which is comprised of small-enrollment schools in Bergen, Hudson, Morris and Passaic counties, and was created following a reorganization of sports leagues in Northern New Jersey by the New Jersey State Interscholastic Athletic Association (NJSIAA). With 646 students in grades 10–12, the school was classified by the NJSIAA for the 2019–20 school year as Group II for most athletic competition purposes, which included schools with an enrollment of 486 to 758 students in that grade range. Prior to realignment that took effect in the fall of 2010, Lodi High School was a member of the smaller Bergen-Passaic Scholastic League (BPSL). The school was classified by the NJSIAA as Group II North for football for 2024–2026, which included schools with 484 to 683 students.

The 1939 boys' basketball team won the Group III state championship with a 26–20 victory against South River High School in the final game of the playoff tournament.

The football team won the North I Group II state sectional championship in 1992 and 1998 and the North II Group II title in 2005. The 1992 team finished the season with a record of 11-0 after winning the North I Group II sectional title with a 7–6 win against two-time defending-champion Lenape Valley Regional High School in the championship game. The team won the North II Group II state sectional championship in 2005, defeating Chatham High School 21–7 in the tournament final.

The baseball team won the North I Group II sectional championship in 2003.

The girls' volleyball team qualified for the state tournament in both 2006 and 2007, falling in the tournament's first round both years.

Jerry Rinaldi was state wrestling champion (189 lb) in 2003. Keith Dobish was the wrestling state champion (189 lb) in 2006.

== Administration ==
The school's principal is Michael Attanasio. His core administrative team includes the vice principal and the athletic director.

== Notable alumni ==
- Jim Catania (born 1954, class of 1971), musician, commonly known as "Mr. Jim", who replaced drummer Manny Martínez with the Misfits
- Dr. Chud (born 1964 as David Calabrese), punk rock drummer and singer, most notably of The Misfits
- Brian Cina, politician who serves in the Vermont House of Representatives
- Joe Cunningham (1931–2021), baseball first baseman and outfielder who played in Major League Baseball for the St. Louis Cardinals, Chicago White Sox and Washington Senators from 1954 to 1966
- Glenn Danzig (born 1955, class of 1973), of the bands The Misfits, Samhain, and Danzig
- Doyle Wolfgang von Frankenstein (born 1964 as Paul Caiafa, class of 1982), younger brother of Jerry Only who replaced Bobby Steele in the Misfits, after Steele was kicked out
- James Guarantano (born 1969), wide receiver for the NFL's San Diego Chargers and the CFL's Baltimore Stallions
- Howie Janotta (1924–2010), professional basketball player who played for the Baltimore Bullets in 9 games during the 1949–50 NBA season
- Jerry Only (born 1959 as Gerald Caiafa, class of 1977) of the band The Misfits
- Rich Skrosky (born 1964), football coach
- Eerie Von (born 1964 as Eric Stellmann), of the bands Samhain and Danzig
- Steve Zing (born 1964 as Steven Grecco), drummers of the bands Mourning Noise, Samhain, and Son of Sam, who plays bass on tour with Danzig and fronts his own band, Marra's Drug.
- Robert Zoellner (1932–2014; class of 1950), investor and stamp collector who was the second person to have assembled a complete collection of United States postage stamps
