= Bizz =

American rock guitarist

Bizz (born Bryce Bernius) is an American rock guitarist, best known for his work with industrial/shock rock band Genitorturers, horror punk band The Undead (also featuring ex members of The Misfits; Bobby Steele and Joey Image), and Sydney metal band Our Last Enemy. He is also a founding member of Florida based punk band MadCap.
