= Mourning Noise =

American horror/hardcore punk band

- Also known as: Implosion
- Origin: Lodi, New Jersey, U.S.
- Genres: Horror punk; punk rock
- Years active: 1981–1984; 2021–present
- Labels: Nightlatche; Radcore; Forefront; Grand Theft Audio; Cleopatra
- Members: Steve Zing; Robby Bloodshed; Tommy Koprowski
- Past members: Mike Mansfield; Peter "Damien" Marshall; Jonny Noize; Joe "Jay" Olivetti; Ashley Morance; Chris Morance
- Website: mourningnoise.bandcamp.com

Mourning Noise is an American horror- and hardcore punk band from Lodi, New Jersey, notable for drummer Steve Zing. Active around the time of the Misfits, Mourning Noise were strongly influenced by the Misfits as drummer Steve Zing lived very close to Jerry Only and Doyle's house and Steve went to high school with Doyle. Their music was typically fast and melodic. Mourning Noise released only a small amount of material, typically as 7-inch singles, apart from the 1998 collection album Death Trip Delivery. Steve later went on to play for Samhain, Son of Sam, The Undead, Chyna, Doomtree, and later, Danzig.

Samhain guitarist Damien was briefly a member of the band.

== Members ==
2021- lineup

- Robby Bloodshed - Vocals, Guitar
- Chris Morance - Bass
- Tommy Koprowski - Guitar
- Steve Zing - Drums

== Past members ==
- Peter “Damien” Marshall

== Discography ==
=== EP's ===
- Dawn of the Dead 7" (1983)
- Runaway Steve Zing solo, recorded with Mourning Noise members 7" (1986)
- Live Nightmares Split 7" with the Parasites (1990)
- …at the Seville 7" (2022)

=== Studio albums ===
- Screams/Dreams (2024)
- Serpent Lip Service (2026)

=== Compilation albums ===
- Death Trip Delivery: 1981 - 1985 CD (1998)
- Mourning Noise LP/CD (2021)
