= Lesbian Bed Death =

British gothic punk band

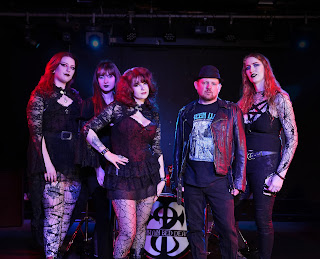
- Band members of Lesbian Bed Death (from left to right): Ali Vicious, Effie, JJ Connor, Dan Peach, Aimee Violet

Background information
- Origin: Stoke-on-Trent, England
- Genres: Gothic rock; horror punk; hard rock; heavy metal; gothic metal
- Years active: 2004–present
- Labels: Psychophonic Records; WormHoleDeath

Lesbian Bed Death are a British gothic punk and hard rock band.

== Members ==
=== Current members ===
- Daniel "Mr Peach" Peach – guitar
- JJ Connor – vocals
- Effie – bass
- Aimee Violet – drums
- Ali Vicious – lead guitar

== Discography ==
=== Studio albums ===
- I Use My Powers for Evil (2006)
- Designed by the Devil, Powered by the Dead (2010)
- Riot of the Living Dead (2012)
- The Devil’s Bounty Hunters (2013)
- Evil Never Dies (2016)
- Born to Die on VHS (2019)
- The Witching Hour (2021)
- Midnight Lust (2024)
- Satan’s Cellar (2026)
