= Leroy Bowman =

US Army Air Force officer (1921–2014)

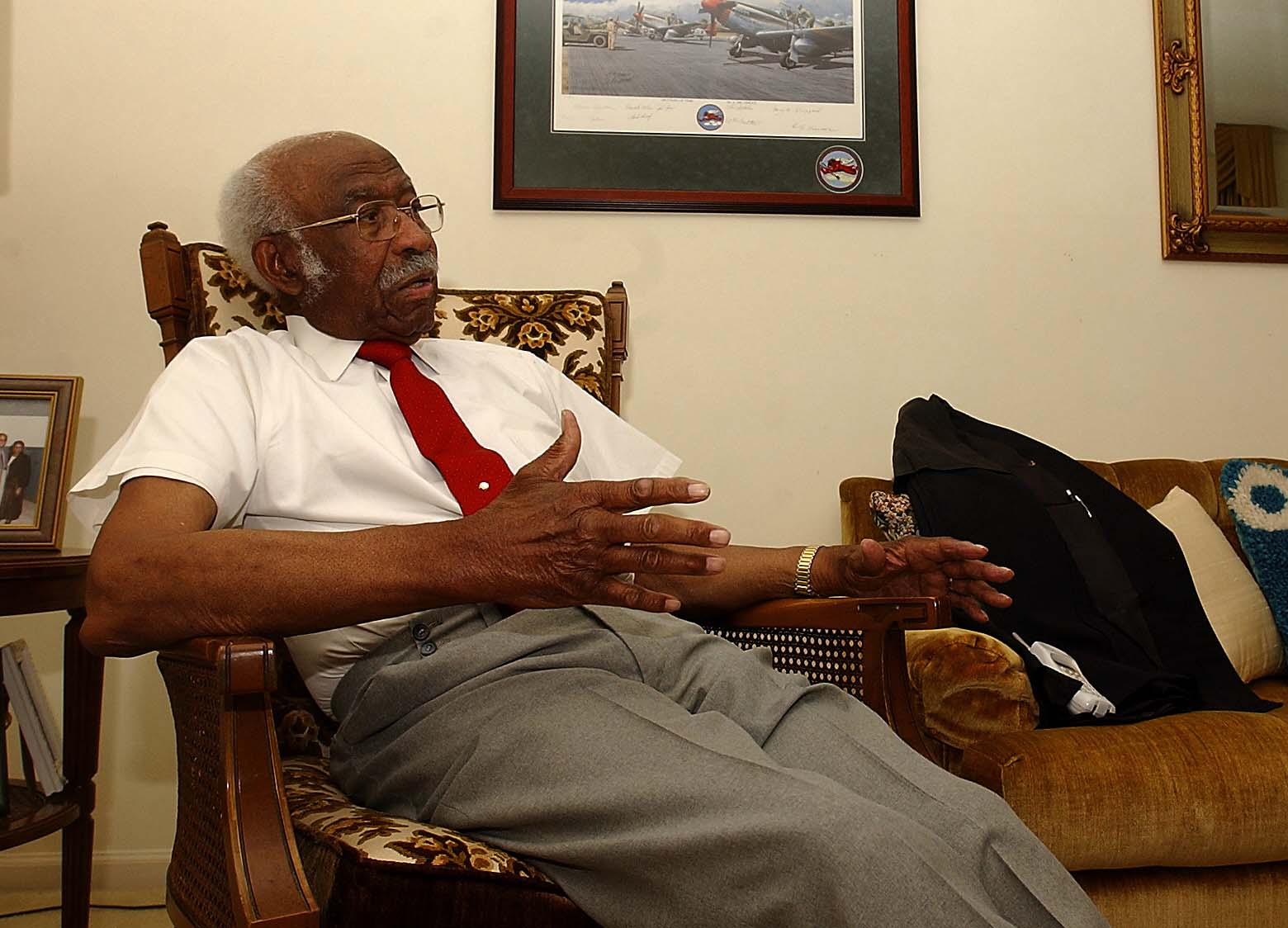
On March 29, 2007, Leroy Bowman was present when President George W. Bush awarded the Congressional Gold Medal to the original Tuskegee Airmen.

Lieutenant Leroy Bowman (November 2, 1921 – February 26, 2014) was a U.S. Army Air Forces officer and combat fighter pilot with the 332nd Fighter Group during World War II. As one of the original 994 Tuskegee Airmen, Bowman was part of the first group of African American military aviators in the United States Armed Forces. He flew dozens of combat missions over Europe, contributing to the unit’s combat record. Bowman became an educator and school administrator in Long Island, New York, after his military service.

== Early life ==
Leroy Bowman was born on November 2, 1921, in Sumter, South Carolina, the son of Brooks Bowman and Rena Smith Bowman Canty. Bowman’s father, Brooks, was a World War I veteran who died in 1922. His mother, Rena, then married Rev. Benjamin F. Canty, Sr. Raised in Sumter, Bowman graduated in 1940 from Morris College High School, which was affiliated with the historically Black institution Morris College. He was a member of the drama club and a football player.

== Military service in World War II ==
Bowman entered the United States Army in September 1941, just months before the United States joined World War II. From September 1941 to July 1942, he served at Fort Jackson, South Carolina; Fort Bragg, North Carolina, and Fort Eustis, Virginia. In December 1941, he was assigned to the 76th Coast Artillery Unit in Philadelphia, Pennsylvania, and traveled with this unit to Los Angeles before deployment to the South Pacific. Bowman was then reassigned to aviation cadet training at the segregated Tuskegee Army Air Field, now known as Sharpe Field in Tuskegee, Alabama. He trained in a series of military aircraft, including the PT-17, BT-13, and AT-6 trainers. On March 25, 1943, he graduated as a second lieutenant with Class 43-C, officially becoming a single-engine fighter pilot in the U.S. Army Air Corps, one of 994 Black military aviators who trained at the isolated and segregated training complex at the Tuskegee Institute.

As a member of the 332nd Fighter Group, Bowman received additional training in Oscoda, Michigan, at Selfridge Airfield. He then embarked to the United States Army 15th Air Force in Southern Italy. Bowman flew 36 combat missions over Europe. His primary duty was to escort American bombers on raids over Nazi-occupied territories in North Africa and Italy, defending them from attacks by the German Luftwaffe. The 332nd Fighter Group painted the tails of their planes red coining the nickname the “red tails.” The group shot down more than 100 enemy aircraft, earning a reputation for discipline and bravery.

== Post-war life and career ==
After World War II, Bowman returned to South Carolina and earned a degree in education from Morris College. He taught briefly before rejoining the U.S. military in 1951, just before the outbreak of the Korean War. Bowman continued to serve in various capacities until his retirement in 1968, ultimately attaining the rank of master sergeant. His military service spanned a total of 23 years.

Bowman then earned a master’s degree in education with a concentration in elementary science and administration from Hofstra University in Hempstead, New York. In 1968, he moved to Roosevelt, New York, where he relaunched a career in education in Long Island’s public school system. Bowman worked as a teacher, a principal, and an administrator for curriculum and attendance in the Union Free School District #9, Wyandanch, New York. He retired in 1986.

Following retirement, Bowman returned to his hometown of Sumter. Where he remained deeply involved in community and church life at First Baptist Missionary Church. Where, he served as a deacon, Sunday School superintendent, and adult education teacher. Bowman was also a member of the Spann Watson Chapter of Tuskegee Airmen Inc, an organization whose members travel to various schools, churches, community groups, companies, and organizations to spread awareness of Black accomplishments in aviation history.

Bowman married Mildred Watson in 1955. Together, they had two sons, James and George Bowman.

== Death ==
Lt. Leroy Bowman died on February 26, 2014, in Sumter, South Carolina, at the age of 92 from natural causes. He is buried at Walker Cemetery in Sumter.

== Legacy and honors ==
Lt. Leroy Bowman’s legacy as a Tuskegee Airman and community leader has been widely recognized:

- February 23, 2006: Tuskegee University awarded Bowman an Honorary Doctorate in Public Service in recognition of his wartime service and contributions to society.
- March 29, 2007: President George W. Bush awarded the Congressional Gold Medal to the original Tuskegee Airmen at the U.S. Capitol. Bowman was one of the approximately 300 surviving airmen present for the ceremony.
- May 29, 2009: Morris College awarded Bowman an Honorary Doctorate of Humane Letters.
- July 14, 2016: Shaw Air Force Base in Sumter renamed a roadway “Ashley-Bowman Boulevard” in honor of Bowman and fellow Sumter native and Tuskegee Airman Col. Willie Ashley.
- February 9, 2024: The City of Sumter unveiled a new monument dedicated to the four Tuskegee Airmen with ties to the local community: Leroy Bowman, Willie Ashley, Philip Rembert, and Emmett Rice. The monument contains the only full-scale replica on permanent public display of the P-51 Mustang “Red Tail” outside of the National Historic Site in Tuskegee, Alabama.
