= Steve Zing =

American drummer

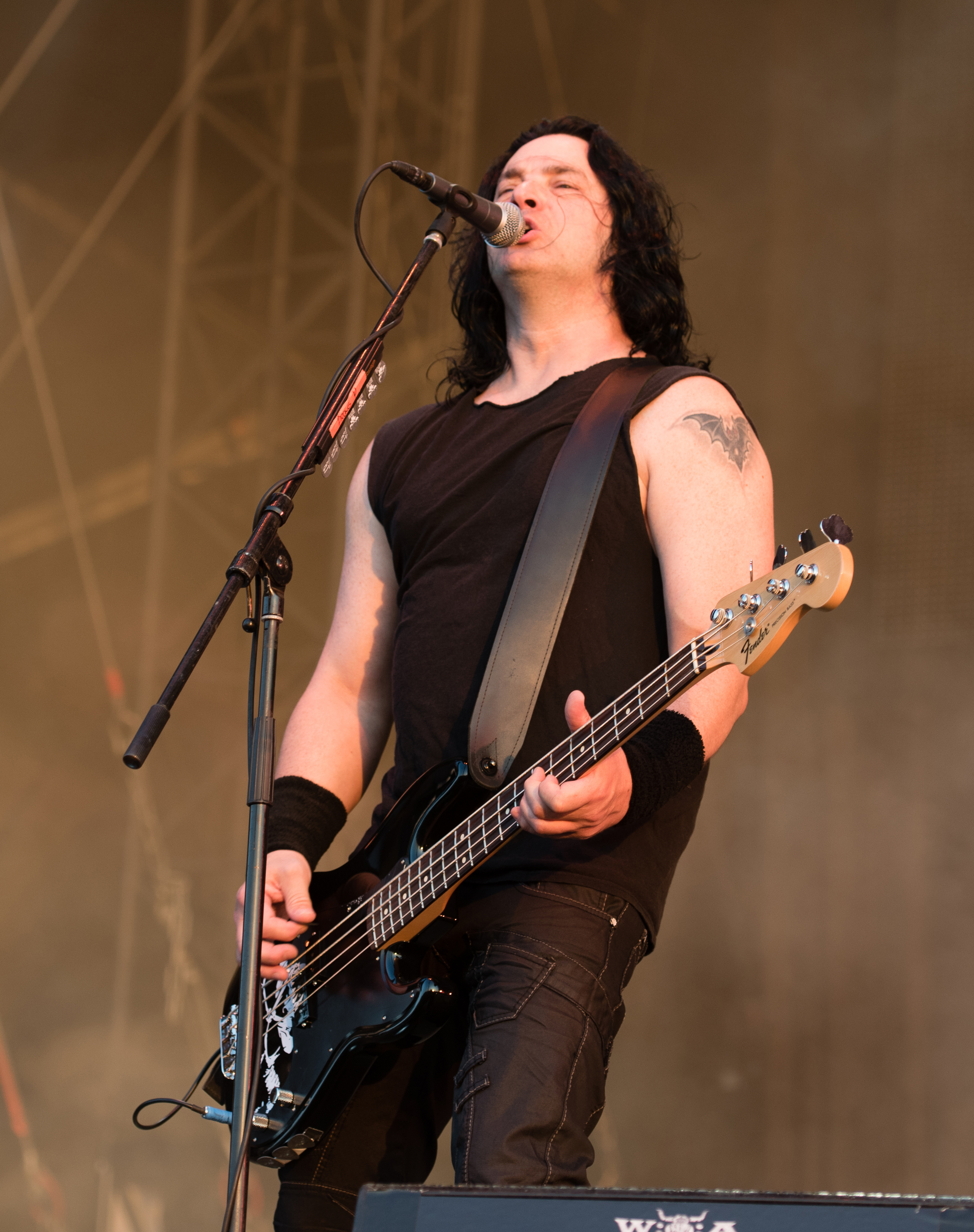
- Zing performing with Danzig in 2018

Background information
- Birth name: Steven Paul Grecco
- Born: June 29, 1964 (age 60)
- Occupation: Musician
- Instrument(s): Drums, bass
- Member of: Implosion, Mourning Noise, The Undead, Danzig
- Formerly of: Samhain

Steve Zing (born Steven Paul Grecco; June 29, 1964) is an American drummer and bassist. He has performed with Implosion, Mourning Noise, and The Undead before joining Samhain.

He graduated in 1982 from Lodi High School in Lodi, New Jersey together with Eerie Von and Doyle Wolfgang von Frankenstein. Zing left Samhain in July 1985 shortly after the Unholy Passion EP was released. He was replaced by London May and returned briefly to The Undead in 1986. He later formed Chyna and played briefly for Rubella Umbrella in 1996.

In 1999, Zing returned to Samhain for the reunion tour, playing the first half of the show on drums, and the second on bass. He later recorded with Son of Sam, which included AFI vocalist Davey Havok, then-Danzig guitarist Todd Youth and former Samhain and Tiger Army drummer London May. The album featured guest appearances by Glenn Danzig and then-Danzig drummer Joey Castillo.

Zing fronts his own horror punk/heavy metal hybrid band, Marra's Drug. The band's first album Down Below was released on Long Live Crime Records, an indie label in Los Angeles. The band originally used the name Doomtree, but the name was changed for legal reasons.

He also tours with Danzig playing bass, and the band occasionally plays Samhain songs live.

== Releases ==
- Samhain
  - Initium (1984)
  - Unholy Passion (1985)
  - Box Set (2000)
  - Samhain Live '85-'86 (2001)
- Son of Sam
  - Songs from the Earth (2001)
  - Into the Night (2008)
- Doomtree (now Marra's Drug)
  - Down Below (2005)
  - White Christmas internet single (November 10, 2005)
  - Icons Of The Underground: Vol. 1 – Glenn Danzig (2006)
  - Xmas Medley myspace.com track (2006)
  - Santa Claus Go Straight To The Ghetto myspace.com track (2006)
- The Undead
  - Never Say Die (1985)
  - Never Say Die (1986)
  - Act Your Rage (1989)
  - Dawn of the Undead (1991)
- Mourning Noise
  - Dawn of the Dead EP (1983)
  - Runaway (1986) (Steve Zing solo, recorded with Mourning Noise members) (Single)
  - Death Trip Delivery: 1981–1985 (1998)
  - Christmas time in Jersey/Blue Xmas (Recorded as "We 3 Steves" with his brother and nephew) (2014)
