= Into the Night (Son of Sam album) =

Studio album by Son of Sam
- Released: September 16, 2008
- Genre: Horror punk, death rock
- Length: 32:46
- Label: Caroline Horror High

Son of Sam chronology
Songs from the Earth (2001)	Into the Night (2008)

Into the Night is the second album by horror punk band Son of Sam. It was released on September 16, 2008.

== Track listing ==
Into the Night track listing
No.	Title	Length
1.	"The Bleeding"	4:19
2.	"Suffer"	3:20
3.	"Dark Life"	3:15
4.	"Into the Night"	3:18
5.	"Twisted Soul"	4:00
6.	"Death Baby"	4:32
7.	"They Have Risen"	1:38
8.	"Sons of New"	3:46
9.	"Darkness Calls" (Pure Evil II)	4:38
Total length:		32:46

== Personnel ==
- Ian Thorne - Vocals
- Steve Zing - Bass
- Todd Youth - Guitar
- Karl Rosqvist - Drums
