= Death Trip Delivery: 1981–1985 =

Compilation album by Mourning Noise
- Released: April 1, 1998
- Genre: Hardcore punk Horror punk
- Label: Grand Theft Audio

Death Trip Delivery: 1981–1985 is an album by American punk band Mourning Noise. It was released in 1998, on CD on Grand Theft Audio.

== Track listing ==
- 1. Nestle Baby Killer – 1.19
- 2. Death in a White Cloud – 1.19
- 3. Crimson Carrie – 2.06
- 4. Mr. Surveillance – 1.53
- 5. Progress for the People – 2.14
- 6. Monster Madness – 2.33
- 7. Murder Machine – 0.45
- 8. Empty Grave – 1.49
- 9. Monster Madness – 2.32
- 10. Vincent's Theme – 1.23
- 11. Underground Zero – 1.18
- 12. Barbarian Hunt – 1.18
- 13. Dawn of the Dead – 2.05
- 14. Fighting Chance – 1.02
- 15. Laser Lights – 2.08
- 16. My Demon Eyes – 1.56
- 17. Addiction – 3.05
- 18. Monster Madness (1981 demo) – 2.23
- 19. Vincent's Theme (1981 demo) – 1.34
- 20. Underground Zero (1981 demo) – 1.23
- 21. Foolish Grief – 3.42
- 22. Progress for the People (live September 16, 1982) – 1.55
- 23. Fighting Chance (live September 16, 1982) – 1.12
- 24. Vincent's Theme (live September 16, 1982) – 1.26
- 25. Laser Lights (live September 16, 1982) – 2.05
- 26. Sergio (live September 16, 1982) – 0.48
- 27. Addiction (live September 16, 1982) – 3.43
- 28. My Demon Eyes (live September 16, 1982) – 2.31
- 29. Radical (live September 16, 1982) – 1.58
- 30. Crimson Carrie (live September 16, 1982) – 2.21
- 31. Dawn of the Dead (live September 16, 1982) – 2.29
- 32. Monster Madness (live September 16, 1982) – 3.14
- 33. Batman – 1.37

=== Notes ===
Tracks 1–12 & 33 recorded April 1983 at Reel Platinum for the planned Mourning Noise LP that never surfaced.
Tracks 13–17 recorded in 1982 at Reel Platinum and released on the Dawn of the Dead EP in 1983.
Tracks 18–20 are previously unreleased demos recorded in 1981 at Blue Moon.
Track 21 was recorded in 1985 at Reel Platinum and is from the same session that produced Steve Zing's "Runaway" single.
Tracks 22–32 were recorded live on September 16, 1982, at WFMU 91.1 in South Orange, NJ.

== Credits ==
All tracks written by Mourning Noise except "Progress for the People" by Bruce Wingate & Paul Richards; "Batman" by Neal Hefti.
Mike Mansfield: vocals
Chris Morance: bass
Tommy Koprowski: guitar (tracks 1–20, 22–33)
Steve Zing: drums
Ashley Morance: guitar (track 21 only)
