= Lodi Public Schools =

School district in Bergen County, New Jersey, US

Address
- 8 Hunter Street Lodi, Bergen County, New Jersey, 07644; United States
- Coordinates: 40.872588°N 74.087060°W

District information
- Grades: pre-K to 12
- Superintendent: Frank D'Amico
- Business administrator: Michael Rinderknecht (interim)
- Schools: 7

Students and staff
- Enrollment: 3,213 (as of 2021–22)
- Faculty: 233.5 FTEs
- Student–teacher ratio: 13.8:1

Other information
- District Factor Group: B
- Website: www.lodinjschools.org
Ind.	Per pupil	District spending	Rank (*)	K-12 average	%± vs. average
1A	Total Spending	$16,531	18	$18,891	−12.5%
1	Budgetary Cost	11,775	6	14,783	−20.3%
2	Classroom Instruction	6,836	6	8,763	−22.0%
6	Support Services	1,796	13	2,392	−24.9%
8	Administrative Cost	1,448	23	1,485	−2.5%
10	Operations & Maintenance	1,420	20	1,783	−20.4%
13	Extracurricular Activities	201	3	268	−25.0%
16	Median Teacher Salary	55,715	8	64,043
Data from NJDoE 2014 Taxpayers' Guide to Education Spending. *Of K-12 districts with 1,800-3,500 students. Lowest spending=1; Highest=68

The Lodi Public Schools are a comprehensive community public school district that serves students in pre-kindergarten through twelfth grade from Lodi, in Bergen County, in the U.S. state of New Jersey.

As of the 2021–22 school year, the district, comprising seven schools, had an enrollment of 3,213 students and 233.5 classroom teachers (on an FTE basis), for a student–teacher ratio of 13.8:1.

The district is classified by the New Jersey Department of Education as being in District Factor Group "B", the second-lowest of eight groupings. District Factor Groups organize districts statewide to allow comparison by common socioeconomic characteristics of the local districts. From lowest socioeconomic status to highest, the categories are A, B, CD, DE, FG, GH, I and J.

== Schools ==
Schools in the district (with 2021–22 enrollment data from the National Center for Education Statistics) are:

Elementary schools

- Columbus Elementary School with 244 students in grades K-5
  - Robert Cannizzaro, principal
- Hilltop Elementary School with 290 students in grades PreK-5
  - Glenn Focarino, principal
- Roosevelt Elementary School with 182 students in grades PreK-5
  - Jack Lipari, principal
- Washington Elementary School with 338 students in grades PreK-5
  - Kevin Dowson, principal
- Wilson Elementary School with 347 students in grades PreK-5
  - Christie Vanderhook, principal

Middle school

- Thomas Jefferson Middle School with 709 students in grades 6-8
  - Michael Cardone, principal

High school

- Lodi High School with 916 students in grades 9-12
  - Edward Bertolini, acting principal

== Administration ==
Core members of the district's administration are:

- Frank D'Amico, superintendent of schools
- Michael Rinderknecht, interim business administrator and board secretary

== Board of education ==
The district's board of education, composed of nine members, sets policy and oversees the fiscal and educational operation of the district through its administration. As a Type II school district, the board's trustees are elected directly by voters to serve three-year terms of office on a staggered basis, with three seats up for election each year held (since 2013) as part of the November general election. The board appoints a superintendent to oversee the district's day-to-day operations and a business administrator to supervise the business functions of the district.
