= Charles W. Dryden =

American Tuskegee Airman fighter pilot (1920–2008)

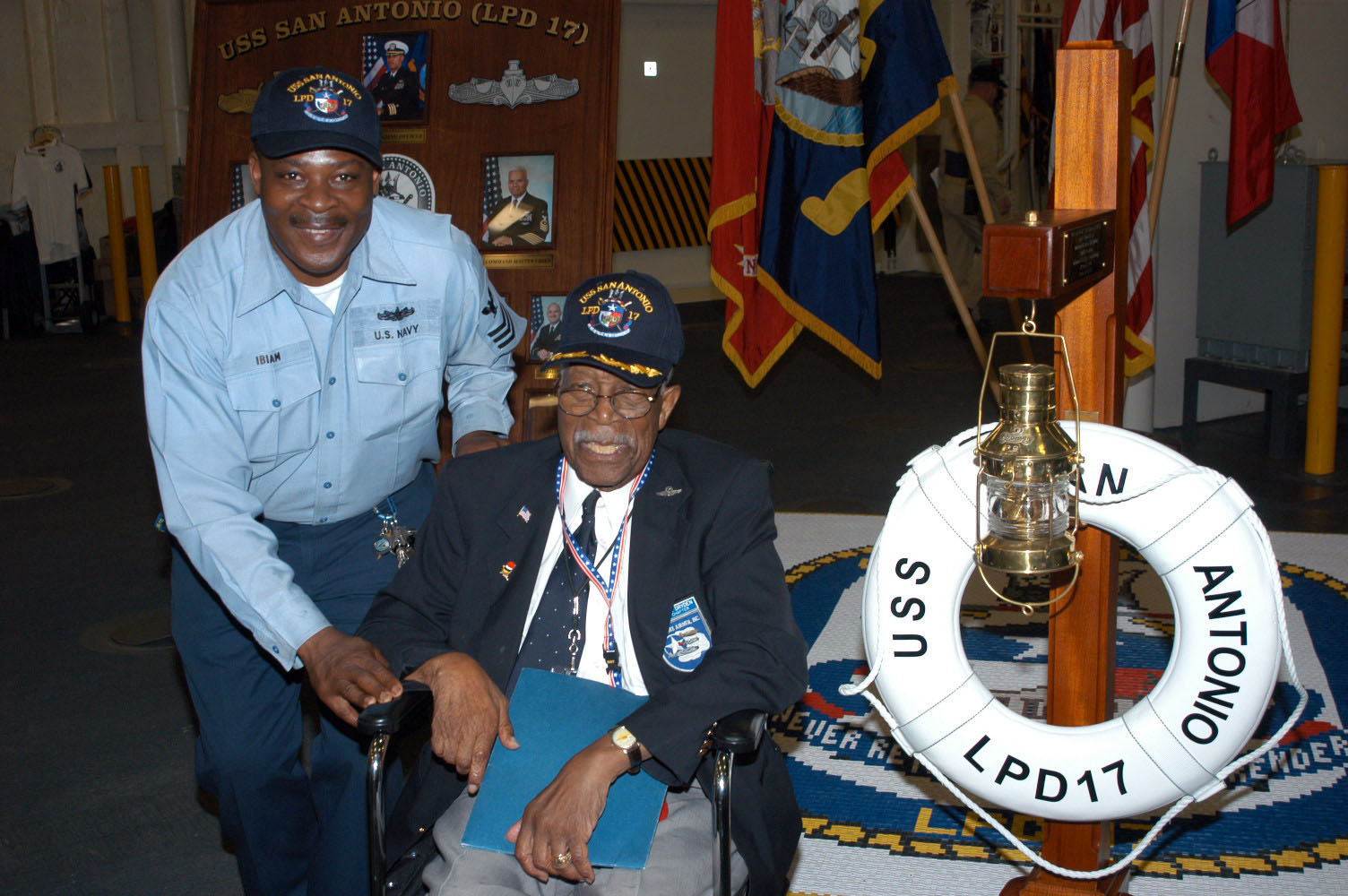
- Charles Dryden (seated) aboard USS San Antonio (May 2006)
- Born: September 16, 1920; New York City, New York, U.S.
- Died: June 24, 2008 (aged 87); Atlanta, Georgia, U.S.
- Burial place: Arlington National Cemetery
- Spouse: Marymal Morgan Dryden
- Children: Charles a.k.a. Thumper Dryden, Keith Dryden, Eric Dryden, George Bingham, Kenneth Bingham, Tony Bingham, Cornelia-Rose White
- Military career
- Allegiance: United States of America
- Branch: United States Army Air Forces; United States Air Force
- Rank: Lieutenant Colonel
- Nickname: "A-TRAIN"
- Conflicts: World War II
- Awards: Georgia Aviation Hall of Fame inductee

Charles Walter Dryden (September 16, 1920 – June 24, 2008) was a U.S. Army Air Force officer and one of the original combat fighter pilots with the 332nd Fighter Group's 99th Fighter Squadron, a component of the Tuskegee Airmen. Among the United States' first eight African American combat fighter pilots, Dryden is notable as a member of the Tuskegee Advance Flying School (TAFS)'s Class Number SE-42-C, the program's 2nd-ever aviation cadet program.

Dryden was one of the first African American U.S. military pilots to engage in aerial combat against an enemy combatant, sharing this honor with 99th Fighter Squadron pilots Sidney P. Brooks, Willie Ashley, Lee Rayford, Leon C. Roberts and Spann Watson.

He is the author of the autobiography, A-Train: Memoirs of a Tuskegee Airman.

== Early life and family ==
Dryden was born on September 16, 1920, in New York City. He was the son of Violet Adina Buckley Dryden and Charles Levy Tucker Dryden, both educators and immigrants from Jamaica who taught college on the island. His father served as a sergeant in the Jamaican military during World War I.

Dryden attended the predominantly white Stitt Junior High School where he served as Class President. He also attended Peter Stuyvesant High School, graduating in 1938.

Dryden was married twice, with three sons from his first marriage and was survived by his wife of over 30 years, Marymal Morgan Dryden, married by Dr. Benjamin E. Mays of Atlanta, Ga. They shared three stepsons and a stepdaughter with 2nd wife Marymal Morgan Dryden.

== Military service, Tuskegee Airmen ==
In August 1941, the U.S. Army Air Corps (USAAC) admitted Dryden to its aviation cadet training at the Tuskegee Army Flying School in Tuskegee, Alabama. On April 29, 1942, graduated from the Tuskegee Advance Flying School (TAFS)'s Class Number SE-42-C - Single Engine Section, earning his silver wings and commission as a 2nd Lieutenant. He and fellow graduates, 2nd Lt Sidney P. Brooks and 2nd Lt Clarence C. Jamison, became the first eight African American combat fighter pilots in history. He was then assigned to the 99th Fighter Squadron, later attached to the 332nd Fighter Group. He earned his nickname "A-Train" from band leader Duke Ellington famous tune and Dryden's roots in New York City. He named his P-40 Tomahawk aircraft, "A-Train.

During World War II, Dryden and his squadron flew numerous combat patrol and bomber escort missions in North Africa and the Mediterranean Theater including Italy and Sicily. On June 9, 1943, he led a flight of six pilots engaging enemy fighter aircraft in aerial combat over Pantelleria, Sicily. It was the first time in aviation history that black American pilots of the U.S. Army Air Corps engaged aircraft in combat.

After he was transferred him back to the United States in Walterboro, South Carolina, Dryden and numerous other African American officers were angered when they saw German prisoners-of-war with greater freedom and access on the racially-segregated base than African-American military members. After performing a low-level flight maneuver over the base in protest, the USAAC court-martialed him.

After World War II, he became a professor of Air Science at Howard University. During his 21 years in the U.S. military, he served in Korea as a reconnaissance pilot, Japan, Germany and several bases in the United States.

In 1962, he retired from the U.S. Air Force with the rank of lieutenant colonel. He logged over 4000 military flight hours during his U.S. Air Force career.

== Post-military ==
In 1955, he earned his Bachelors of Arts degree in political science from Hofstra University. He also earned a master's of arts degree in public law and government from Columbia University.

He served as a director of the Georgia Aviation Hall of Fame which inducted him in 1998.

In 1997, he authored his autobiographical book, "A-Train: Memoirs of a Tuskegee Airman."

== Honors ==
- In 1996, Hofstra University awarded Dryden an honorary doctorate.
- In 1997, the then-Georgia Secretary of State Max Cleland designated Dryden the "Outstanding Georgia Citizen."
- In 2007, then-US President George W. Bush and the US Congress awarded Dryden and other surviving airmen the Congressional Gold Medal.
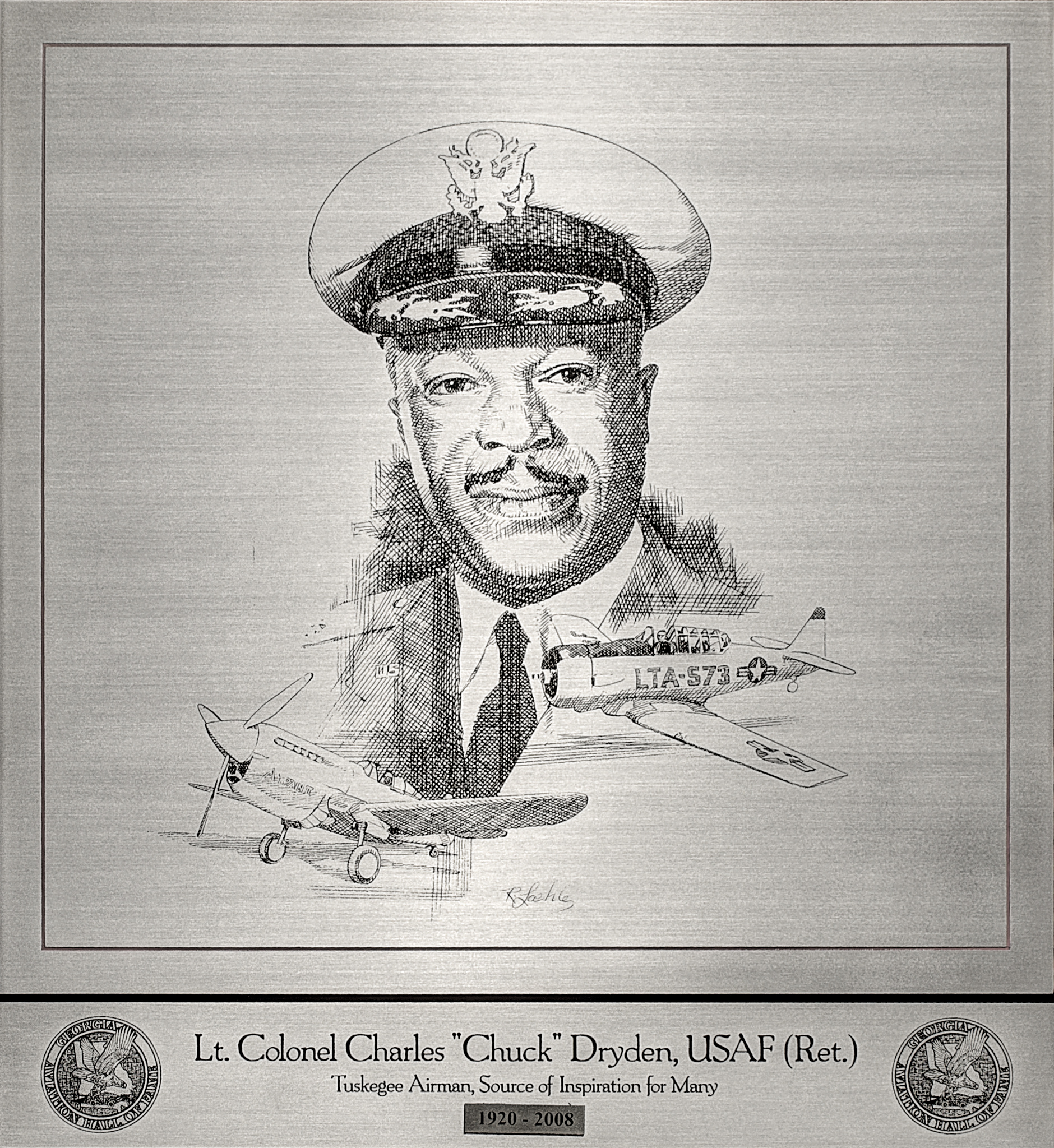
Plaque of Dryden at the Georgia Aviation Hall of Fame

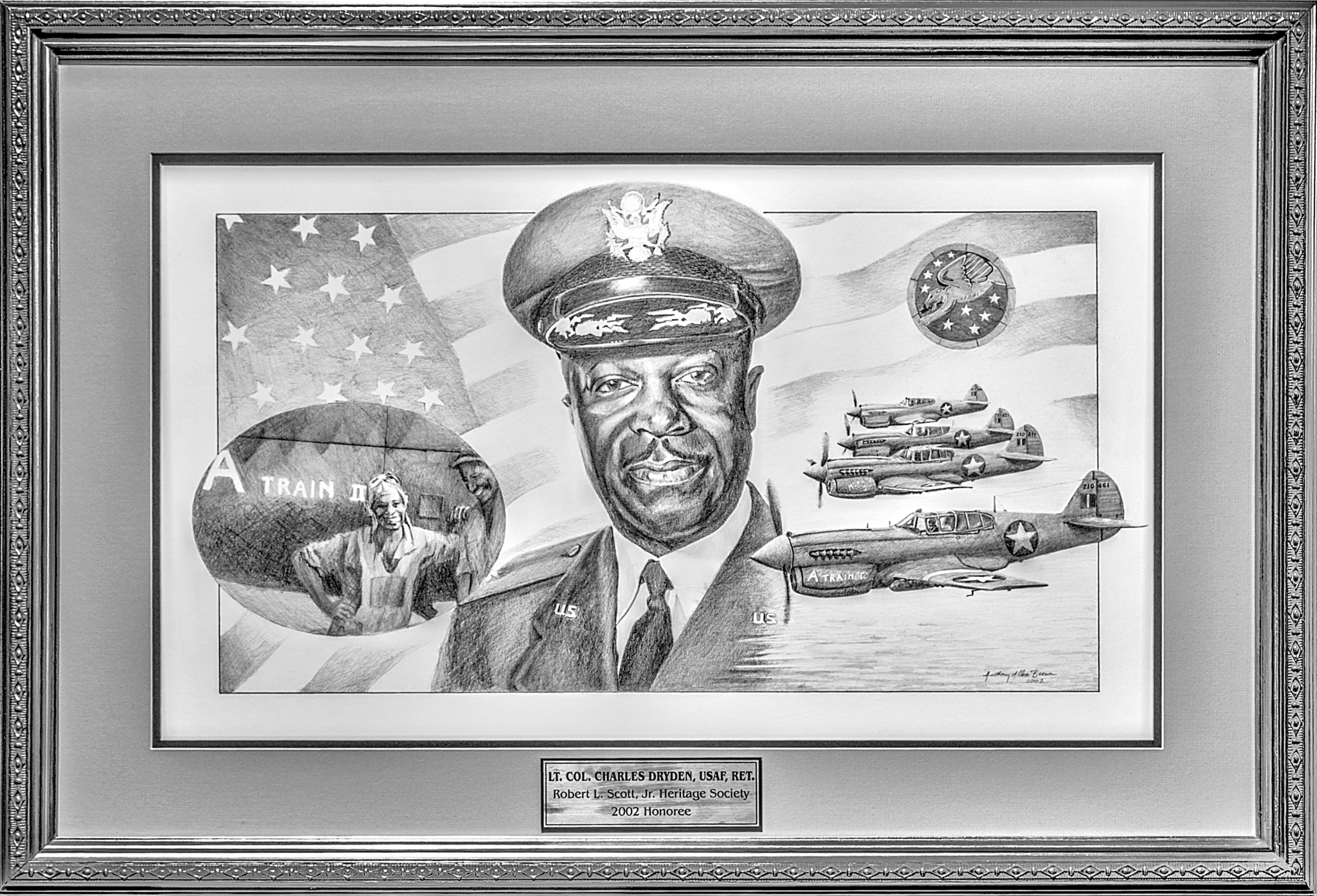
Painting at the Museum of Aviation

== Death ==
Dryden died of natural causes on June 24, 2008, in Atlanta, Georgia, at the age of 87. Former Atlanta mayor and U.S. ambassador Andrew Young delivered Dryden's eulogy. Dryden was interred at Arlington National Cemetery, Section 59, Site 3370, in Arlington, Virginia, Arlington County, Virginia.

== See also ==
- List of Tuskegee Airmen Cadet Pilot Graduation Classes
- List of Tuskegee Airmen
- Military history of African Americans
- Dogfights (TV series)
- Executive Order 9981
- The Tuskegee Airmen (movie)
