= Bobby Steele =

American guitarist (born 1956)

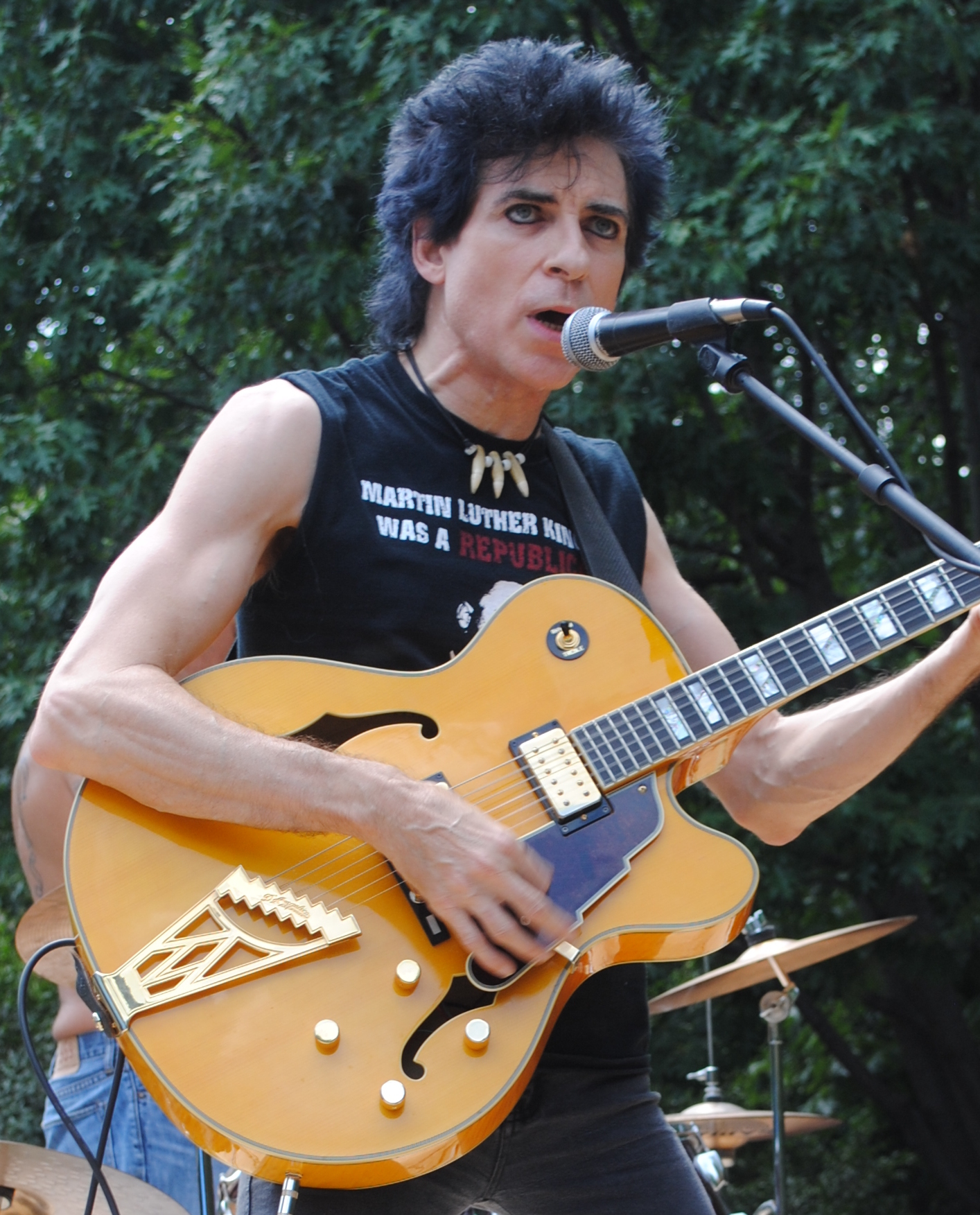
- Steele in 2010

Background information
- Born: Robert Charles Kaufhold; March 18, 1956 (age 70); Teaneck, New Jersey, U.S.
- Genres: Horror punk, hardcore punk
- Occupations: Musician, songwriter
- Instruments: Guitar, vocals
- Years active: 1978–present
- Member of: The Undead
- Formerly of: Misfits

Bobby Steele (born Robert Charles Kaufhold; March 18, 1956) is an American punk rock musician. He is the current guitar player, singer, songwriter, and sole original member of the horror punk band The Undead. He has been a member of multiple other bands, most notably the second guitarist of The Misfits. He married Diana Viar who joined The Undead in November 2014.

== Career ==
Steele grew up in New Milford, New Jersey and lived there until 1978 when he moved into Manhattan, New York. The house he had lived in later became the base for Post Mortem records, a label he founded.

Steele was the guitarist for Parrotox, Slash, and The Whorelords before joining The Misfits in 1978. While with The Misfits, he performed on the Horror Business, Night of the Living Dead and 3 Hits from Hell EPs and his playing can also be heard on the Beware and Halloween EPs as well as the "missing" Misfits album 12 Hits from Hell. After being replaced in October 1980 by Jerry Only's younger brother Doyle Wolfgang von Frankenstein, Steele formed The Undead with Chris Natz and Patrick Blanck. The band released their debut EP, 9 Toes Later, in 1982, which Glenn Danzig helped finance. The Undead have undergone many personnel changes throughout the years and today, Steele is the only remaining original member and chief songwriter of the band.

He has also played with Sloppy Seconds, Times Square, The Migraines, and The Graveyard School.

== Discography ==
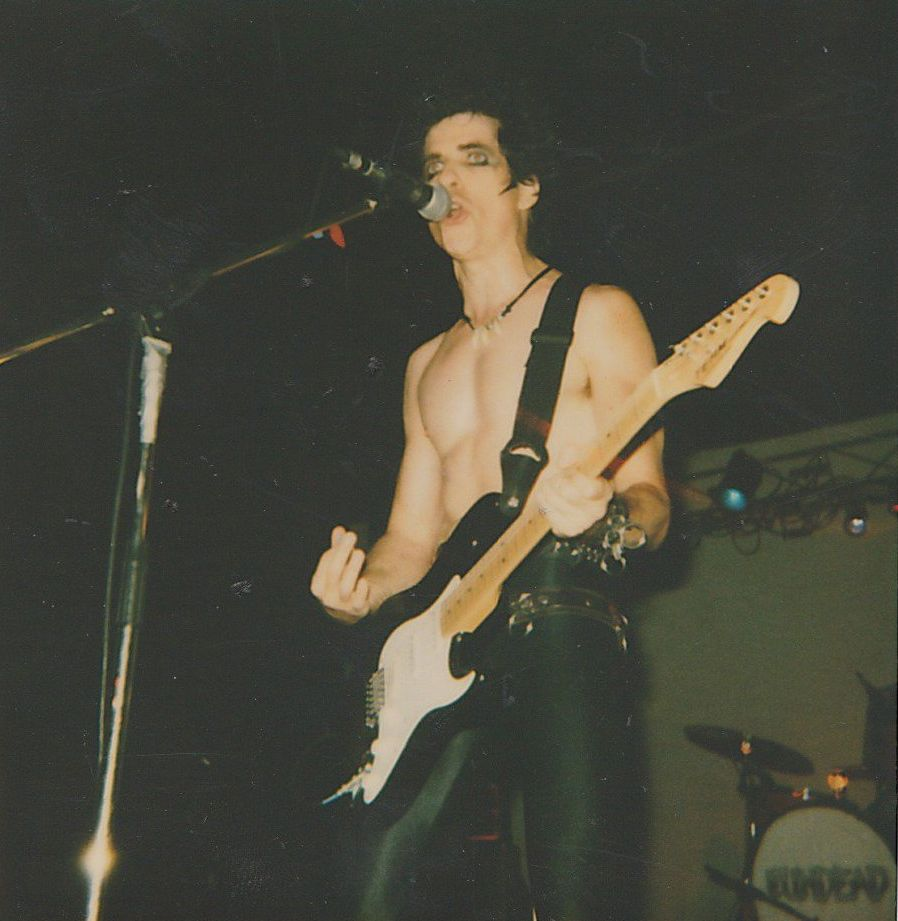
Steele fronting The Undead in 2000

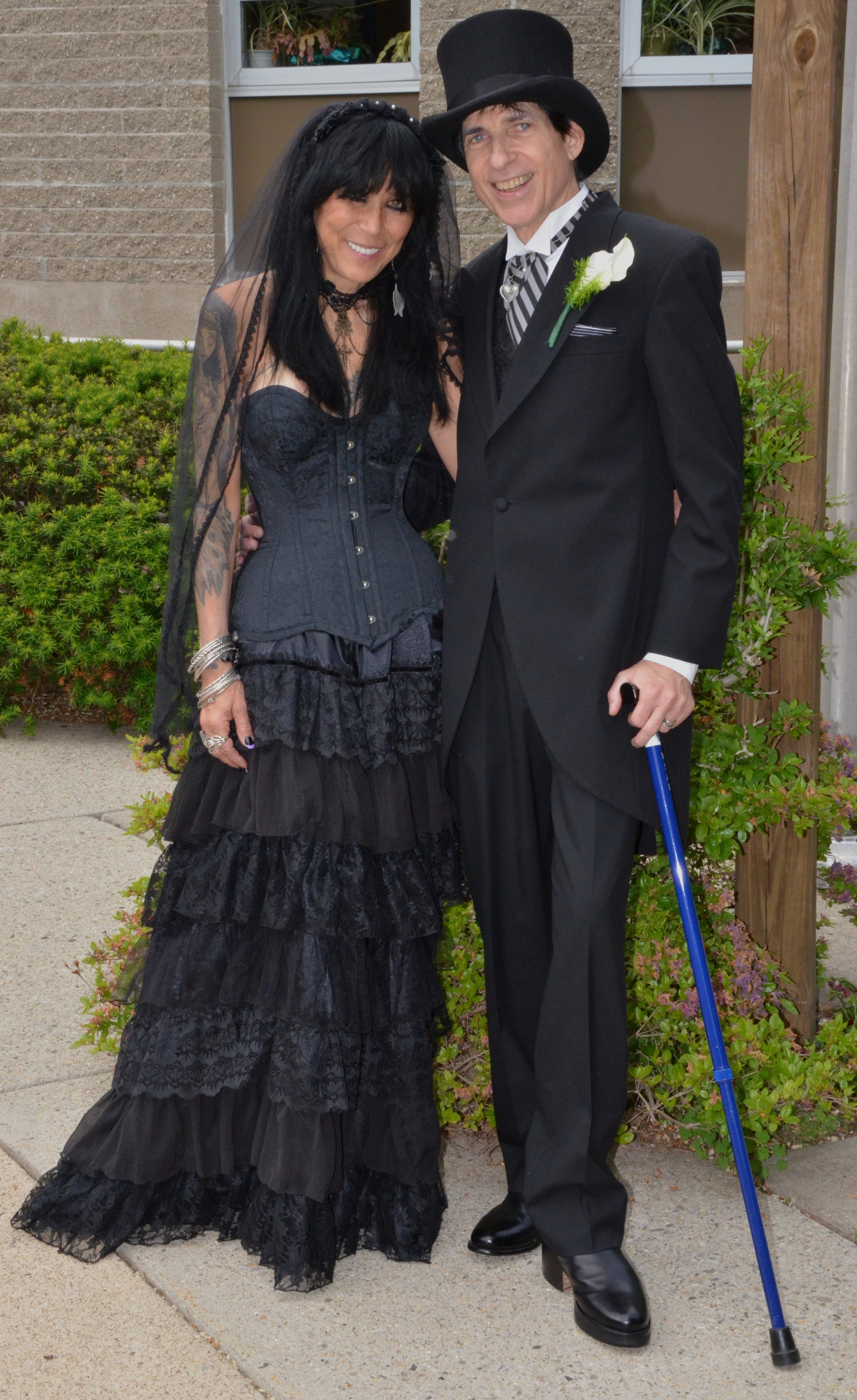
Bobby and Diana Steele

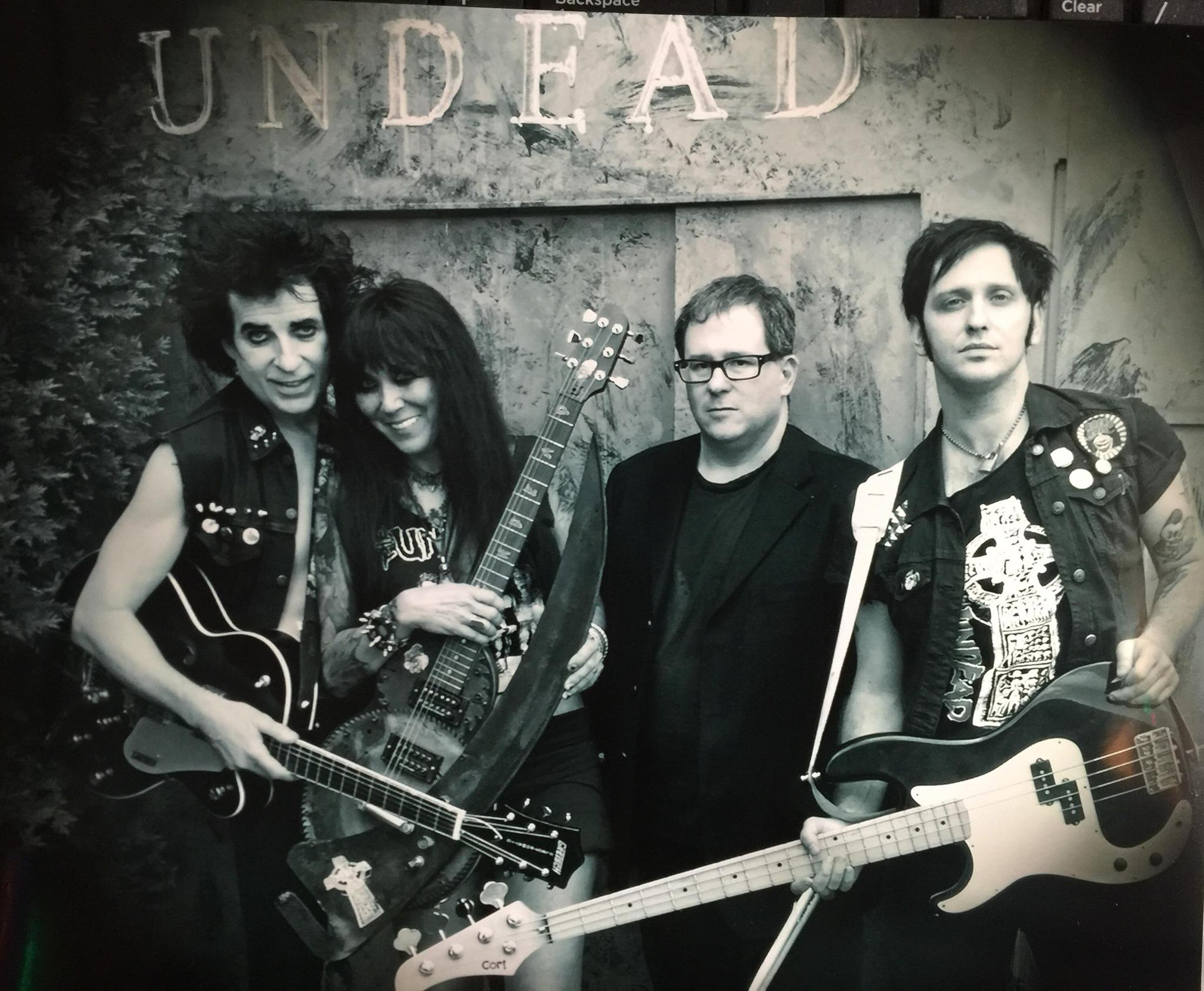
The Undead in 2016

=== The Misfits ===
- Horror Business (1979) – EP
- Night of the Living Dead (1979) – single
- Beware (on "Horror Business", and "Teenagers From Mars") (1980) – EP
- 3 Hits from Hell (on "London Dungeon") (1981) – EP
- Halloween (on "Halloween II") (1981) – single
- 12 Hits from Hell (2001) – LP

=== The Undead ===
==== Albums ====
- Never Say Die (1986) – LP, cassette
- Act Your Rage (1989) – LP, cassette
- Dawn of the Undead (1991) – LP, CD, cassette
- Live Slayer (1992) – LP, CD, cassette
- The Undead (1995) – cassette
- Til Death (1998) – LP, CD
- Still the Undead After All These Years (2007) – CD, LP
- 12 Hits from Hell – Uncovered (2007) – digital-only
- Bobby (a.k.a. Bobby Steele) (2009) – LP, CD
- The Morgue The Merrier (2015) – CD, LP

==== EPs ====
- 9 Toes Later (1982) – 7-inch EP
- Times Square (2000) – split 7-inch EP
- Third World U S A (2002) – 4-song EP
- Rockn'Roll Whore (2002) – 4-song EP
- Be My Ghoul Tonight (2003) – 4-song EP
- I Made a Monster (2009) – 3-song EP
- Having An Undead Summer (2017) – 4-song EP

==== Singles ====
- Verbal Abuse (1983) – 7-inch single
- Never Say Die (1985) – 7-inch single
- Invisible Man (1992) – 7-inch single
- Evening of Desire (1992) – 12-inch single
- There's a Riot in Tompkins Square (1993) – 7-inch single
- Halloween (2007) – 7" single
