= Anthony Castellito =

American union local leader

- Disappeared: June 6, 1961; Ulster County, New York, U.S.
- Other names: “Three Fingers”
- Occupations: Secretary-Treasurer, Teamsters Local 560
- Years active: fl. 1961
- Known for: Murder victim in the Provenzano–Konigsberg case

Anthony Castellito (disappeared June 6, 1961; body never recovered) was an American labor official who served as secretary-treasurer of Teamsters Local 560 in Union City, New Jersey. His disappearance and presumed murder were central to a 1978 criminal case against mob-connected Teamsters leader Anthony Provenzano and enforcer Harold Konigsberg.

== Background ==
In 1961, Castellito was secretary-treasurer of the 13,000-member Local 560, one of the wealthiest Teamsters locals in the United States. His growing popularity was viewed as a threat to Provenzano's control of the union.

== Disappearance ==
On June 6, 1961, Castellito was lured from his home in Lodi, New Jersey, to his summer property in Kerhonkson, Ulster County, New York, under the pretense that an associate needed to hide there. There, according to later testimony, he was ambushed by Salvatore Briguglio, Harold Konigsberg, and others. Briguglio allegedly struck him twice with a hose filled with lead, after which Castellito was strangled with a rope by Briguglio and Salvatore Sinno. Sinno testified that a grave was begun near the property but the burial was interrupted by a local farmer, leading the killers to remove the body and bury it elsewhere in New Jersey. No remains have ever been found.

== Witnesses and investigation ==
The case remained unsolved for fifteen years until Salvatore Sinno surrendered to the FBI in 1976, after living under aliases and fearing Provenzano planned to have him killed. Sinno entered the federal witness protection program and provided detailed testimony of the murder. Other prosecution witnesses included Ralph M. Picardo, who stated that Provenzano had confessed to ordering the killing in a Newark bar, and John A. Madratowski, a local farmer who reported hearing digging near Castellito's property on the day of the disappearance and wrote down a suspicious vehicle's license number that was later traced to Konigsberg's business.

== Trial and convictions ==
In 1978, Anthony Provenzano and Harold Konigsberg were convicted in Ulster County Court of Castellito's murder and sentenced to life imprisonment. Prosecutors charged that Provenzano paid Konigsberg US $15,000 to carry out the killing at Castellito's Kerhonkson home.

== Aftermath and significance ==
Castellito's disappearance removed one of the few internal rivals to Provenzano within Local 560. His murder became a key case in subsequent congressional and law-enforcement investigations into organized crime's control of the Teamsters.

== See also ==
- Anthony Provenzano
- List of people who disappeared
- Organized crime in the United States
