= Songs from the Earth =

Songs From the Earth

Studio album by Son of Sam
- Released: April 17, 2001
- Recorded: 2000
- Genres: Horror punk; deathrock
- Length: 30:16
- Label: Nitro Records
- Producer: Todd Youth

Son of Sam chronology
Songs From the Earth (2001)	Into the Night (2008)

Professional ratings
Review scores
Source	Rating
Allmusic	2.5/5 stars

Songs From the Earth is the debut album by horror punk/deathrock supergroup Son of Sam. The album was a tribute to Glenn Danzig's former band Samhain, though there are no cover songs on the album. Danzig himself plays backup guitar on "Stray," and plays backup guitar and keyboards on the title track "Songs from the Earth." Allmusic notes "Evernight" as sounding like 'Sonic Youth-like art noise' and the title track as being 'very much in the classic Misfits vein.'

== Track listing ==
All lyrics are written by Davey Havok; all music is composed by Todd Youth.

No.	Title	Length
1.	"Of Power"	3:31
2.	"Stray"	2:53
3.	"Evernight"	3:12
4.	"In the Hills"	2:25
5.	"Songs from the Earth"	4:12
6.	"Satiate"	2:40
7.	"Of Man"	2:46
8.	"Michael"	3:14
9.	"Purevil"	3:07
10.	"Invocation"	2:16
Total length:		30:16

== Personnel ==
- Davey Havok – vocals
- Todd Youth – guitar
- London May – drums
- Steve Zing – bass
- Nick 13 – backing vocals on "Stray", "Songs from the Earth" and "Satiate"
- Ricky Mahler – extra lead guitar on "Of Power" and backing vocals
- Joey C. – drums on "Satiate" and backing vocals
- Howie Pyro – bass on "Satiate" and backing vocals
- Crazy Craig – backwards vocals on "Invocation"
- Produced by Todd Youth
- Engineered by Andrew Alekel
- Assisted by Chad Essig
- Mixed by Nick Raskulinecz
- Mastered by Tom Baker
- Photography by BJ Papas
- Layout by Chris Nitro
- Band logo by Linas Garsys
