= Times Square (The Undead EP) =

EP by The Undead and Times Square
- Released: 2000
- Genre: Punk

The Undead chronology
Til Death (1998)	Times Square (2000)	Third World USA (2002)

Times Square is a split EP featuring two Bobby Steele bands, the Undead and Times Square, released in 2000. The track "Bullet" is a cover of a song by Steele's prior band, the Misfits.

== Track listing ==
1. The Undead - "Undead" (live)
2. The Undead - "Bullet" (live)
3. Times Square - "Hipocritic Liberal"
4. Times Square - "42nd Street"

== Musicians ==
The Undead:

- Bobby Steele - vocals, guitar
- Ian Lawrence - bass
- Jaw - drums

Times Square:

- Jill Matthews - vocals, guitar
- Bobby Steele - bass, vocals
- Dave Ari - drums
