= Frederick Behne =

- Born: October 3, 1873; Lodi, New Jersey, US
- Died: February 11, 1918 (aged 44); Brest, France
- Military career
- Allegiance: United States
- Branch: United States Navy
- Rank: Chief Watertender
- Unit: USS Iowa (BB-4)
- Awards: Medal of Honor

Frederick Behne (October 3, 1873 – February 11, 1918) was a fireman first class serving in the United States Navy who received the Medal of Honor for bravery.

== Biography ==
Behne was born October 3, 1873, in Lodi, New Jersey. After joining the Navy he was stationed aboard the USS Iowa (BB-4) as a Fireman First Class. On January 25, 1905, a manhole plate blew out of boiler D. For his actions he received the Medal on March 20, 1905.

Behne later reached the rank of Chief Watertender. He died of pneumonia on February 11, 1918, while serving at a naval base in Brest, France.

== Medal of Honor citation ==
Rank and organization: Fireman First Class, U.S. Navy. Born: 3 October 1873, Lodi, N.J. Accredited to: New Jersey. G.O. No.: 182, 20 March 1905.

Citation:

On board the U.S.S. Iowa, 25 January 1905. Following the blowing out of the manhole plate of boiler D of that vessel, Behne displayed extraordinary heroism in the resulting action.

== See also ==
- List of Medal of Honor recipients in non-combat incidents
