= 9 Toes Later =

EP by The Undead
- Released: June 25, 1982
- Genre: Punk
- Label: Stiff; Post Mortem

9 Toes Later is the debut release from American punk band the Undead. Glenn Danzig of the Misfits helped finance the EP. It was originally released June 25, 1982, on Stiff Records, in an edition of 1,995 copies. It was re-released in 1983 on Rosemary's Babies bassist Post Mortem's own record label, Post Mortem Records. 1,000 copies were pressed of this version. Three early test pressings were also made, all of them owned by Bobby Steele.

One of Steele's toes was amputated around the time of the recording, thus providing the EP title.

== Track listing ==
1. "A Life of Our Own" (Bobby Steele/Dave Street)
2. "My Kinda Town" (Steele)
3. "When the Evening Comes" (Steele)
4. "I Want You Dead" (Steele)

== Personnel ==
- Bobby Steele – guitar, vocals
- Chris Natz – bass
- Patrick Blanck – drums
- Jimi Quidd – producer
- Recorded at Mix-O-Lydian, 08//1981
