= Spann Watson =

Tuskegee Airman and US government official (1916–2020

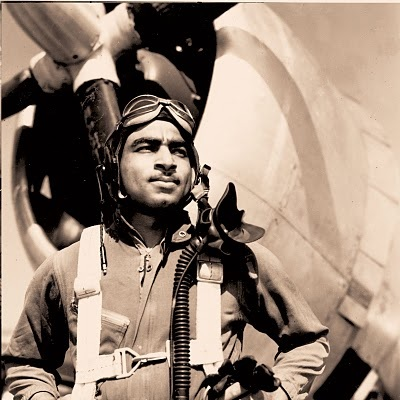
- Spann Watson at Lockbourne AFB in the late 1940s
- Born: August 14, 1916 near Johnston, South Carolina, U.S.
- Died: April 15, 2010 (aged 93); Westbury, New York, U.S.
- Military career
- Allegiance: United States of America
- Branch: United States Army Air Forces
- Service years: 1941–1964
- Rank: Lieutenant Colonel
- Unit: 332d Fighter Group
- Conflicts: World War II
- Awards: Congressional Gold Medal awarded to the Tuskegee Airmen

Spann Watson (August 14, 1916 – April 15, 2010) was an American military aviator and civil servant who served with the Tuskegee Airmen during World War II. He flew over 30 missions in North Africa, Italy and Southern Europe. In March 2007, Watson attended a ceremony in the U.S. Capitol rotunda, where he and other surviving veterans of the Tuskegee Airmen (and their widows) were honored with the Congressional Gold Medal in recognition of their service. He died on April 15, 2010, aged 93.

Watson was among the first African American U.S. military pilots to engage in aerial combat against an enemy combatant, sharing this achievement with 99th Fighter Squadron pilots Sidney P. Brooks, Charles W. Dryden, Leon C. Roberts, Lee Rayford and Willie Ashley.

== Biography ==
=== Early life ===
Watson spent his early life on the family farm outside Johnston, South Carolina. In 1927, the family moved north to Lodi, New Jersey, where he completed his primary education and attended Hackensack High School. In 1937, he enrolled at Howard University as a Mechanical Engineering student and earned a private pilot's license.

=== Military service ===
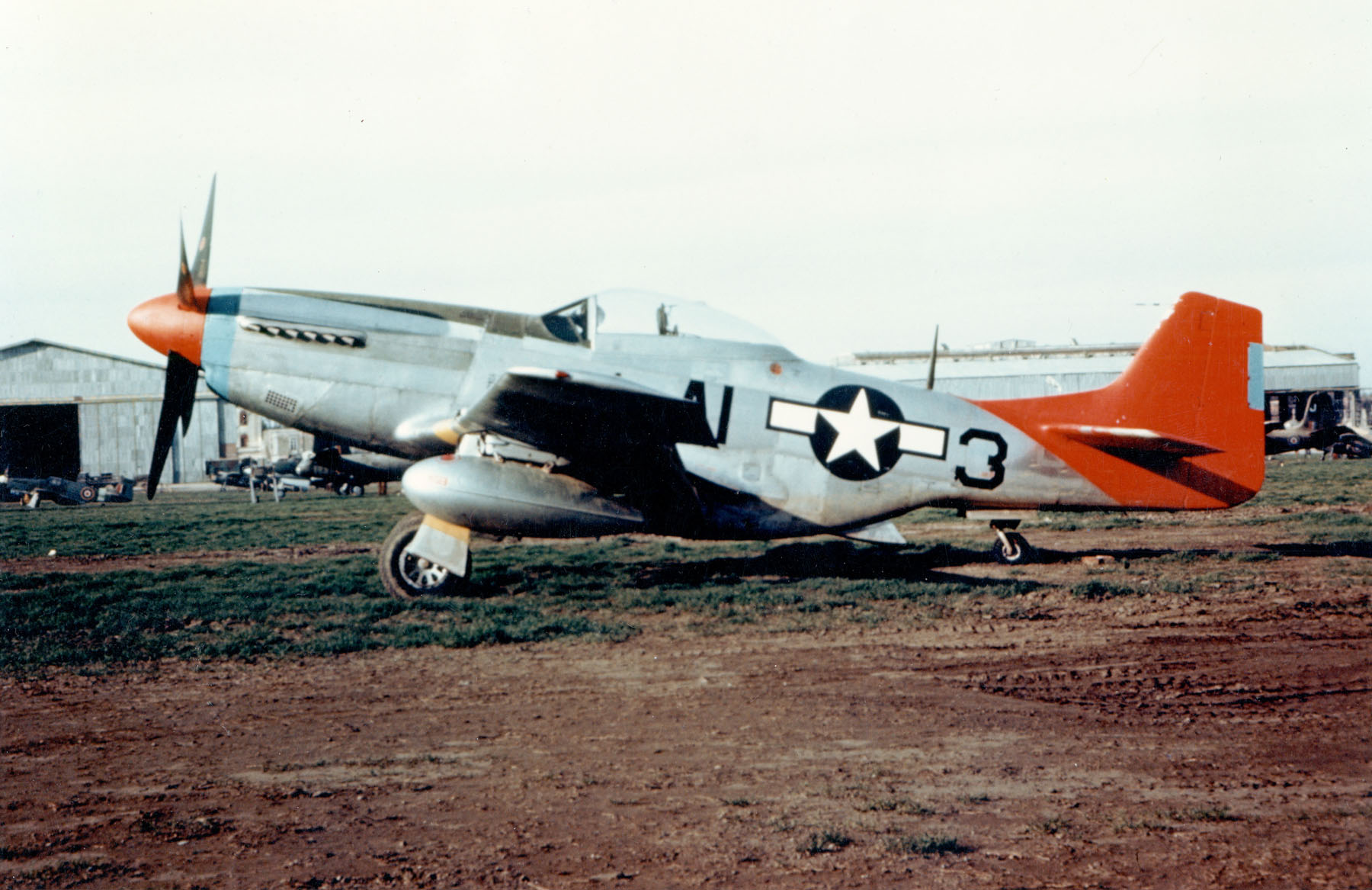
The Tuskegee Airmen's aircraft had distinctive markings that led to the name, "Red Tails." (Note: The red markings that distinguished the Tuskegee Airmen included red bands on the noses of P-51s as well as a red rudder; their P-51B and D Mustangs flew with similar color schemes, with red propeller spinners, yellow wing bands and all-red tail surfaces.)

Watson enlisted as a Flying Cadet in November 1941. Completing pilot training at a segregated Tuskegee Army Air Field, in Tuskegee, Alabama in 1942, he became an original member of the 99th Fighter Squadron, the first group of Tuskegee Airmen to fight in World War II and the forerunner of the 332nd Fighter Group.

In April 1943, he was among the first 27 pilots (classes 42C – 42H) of the 99th Fighter Squadron commanded by then Lt Col Benjamin O. Davis, Jr., deployed to Casablanca. On June 9, 1943, as a member of a flight of six P-40s, led by 1st Lt Charles Dryden, he participated in World War II's first aerial combat engagement between black Americans and the Luftwaffe. He flew combat missions with the 99th, flying P-40's from North Africa, Sicily and the Italian mainland. Returning to the United States as an instructor pilot in the newly formed 332nd Fighter Group, he flew the P-39, P-47, P-51 and B-25 at Selfridge Field, Michigan, Walterboro AAF, South Carolina, Godman Field, Kentucky, Freeman Field, Indiana and Lockbourne AFB, Ohio. While at Freeman Field, he participated in the "Freeman Field Mutiny" against segregated base facilities. After the war, he served as the 99th's Operations Officer until the 332nd was disbanded with the integration of the Air Force in 1949. Later assignments included Manager, Air Traffic Control Facilities, Hawaii and Chief Controller for Air Defense Control Centers in Long Island, New York, Misawa, Japan and Taipei, Taiwan. In 1962, he became Director, Air Defense Center, Stewart Air Force Base in Newburgh, New York, and in 1963, Team Leader, Regional Air Inspector General's Office, Northeast, also at Stewart.

Spann's Air Force career lasted over 23 years, during which he qualified as a Command Pilot and accumulated over 5000 flight hours. He retired from active duty as a Lieutenant Colonel on December 1, 1964.

=== Civilian aviation career ===
In 1965, he began a 27-year civilian career with the Federal Aviation Administration (FAA), initially serving as an Equal Opportunity Specialist and later as a Senior Air Traffic Specialist and Military Air Traffic Liaison. During his time at FAA, he mentored military and civilian aviation professionals and assisted more than 30 African-Americans who went on to attain appointments to Annapolis, West Point or the Air Force Academy. He retired from the FAA on August 3, 1992.

=== Tuskegee Airmen, Inc. ===
He was a founding member and two-term president of the Tuskegee Airmen Incorporated, and a signatory of its Articles of Incorporation.

== Honors and awards ==
- Air Defense Medal
- Distinguished Service Medal
- Air Medal with 2 Oak Leaf Clusters
- Army Commendation Medal
- Congressional Gold Medal awarded to the Tuskegee Airmen in 2006
- Legion of Merit

== See also ==
- Dogfights (TV series)
- Executive Order 9981
- List of Tuskegee Airmen
- Military history of African Americans
- The Tuskegee Airmen (movie)
