= The American Plague =

American rock band

- Origin: Knoxville, Tennessee
- Genres: Rock, hard rock, punk, heavy metal, blues
- Years active: 2001–present
- Labels: Plague Records (2001–2004), Pal-Tone Records (2003), Dr. Cyclops (2005–2006), Long Live Crime (2006), Feedback Symphony Music (2007–present)
- Formerly of: The Undead, 10 Years, the Malignmen
- Members: James "Jaw" Alexander; Ryan "Tater" Johnson; Dave Dammit; Todd Bryant
- Past members: B.J. Fontana; Adam Fontana; Scott Oxendine
- Website: www.americanplague.com

The American Plague is a four-piece American rock band formed in 2001 in Knoxville, Tennessee.

The band was started by singer-guitarist James Dean Brown "Jaw" Alexander after his tenure with Bobby Steele's (formerly of The Misfits) horror-punk group The Undead. Alexander had previously played guitar in punk group The Malignmen, formed in 1995. Due to creative differences, Alexander disbanded the Malignmen in 1999 and left the Undead to form The American Plague in 2001.

== History ==
The American Plague has released material on a multitude of record labels, including Long Live Crime (Los Angeles), Dr. Cyclops Records (Salt Lake City), Pal-Tone Records (Baltimore), Feedback Symphony Music and Plague Records (Knoxville, Tenn.)

The band's notoriety in the Southeast has led to performances with such high-profile acts as Buckcherry, Nashville Pussy, George Thorogood, The Sword, The Cramps and The New York Dolls.

== 2008-present ==
On Valentine's Day 2008, The American Plague released its third full-length album Heart Attack. The 10-song album was produced and recorded by Ryan "Tater" Johnson of Universal recording artist 10 Years. Johnson has regularly appeared live with The American Plague as rhythm guitarist and was announced as an official member in 2010.

In 2008 The American Plague completed a successful tour with 10 Years, Saving Abel and Fair to Midland and appeared at Bonnaroo 2008 in Manchester, Tennessee. A six-song EP, Kiss of Death (produced by Johnson), was released in 2009, followed by regional performances in and around Tennessee. The band took much of 2010 off to write and record. 5 new songs were recorded by Johnson, but have yet to be released. In December, it was announced The American Plague would record with producers Mike Watts (Hopesfall) and Steve Haigler (Pixies, Fuel, Clutch). A new song titled "Leviathan," recorded at the Watts / Haigler session, was released in April 2011.

== Music videos ==
The American Plague has released four music videos, the most recent being "Leviathan," released in May 2011. The video, shot and edited by Travis Stevens, depicts the band performing 'live' in a padded room. For the title track video to the album Heart Attack the band performed in a "party truck" driven by actor David Keith (An Officer and a Gentleman, Firestarter, U-571). Other videos include "Highwayman" (depicting singer Alexander as a maniacal hitchhiker) and "War Song," both directed by independent filmmaker Scott W. Lee (Bluff Point, Static, Dawson's Creek). Several of the band's tracks have been used in independent films, and recently a spot for Palestra.net, which aired on Fox Sports in a segment on the UT Volunteers, the football team of the University of Tennessee in the band's hometown.

== Band members ==
Present

- James "Jaw" Alexander - vocals, guitar
- Dave Dammit - bass
- Ryan "Tater" Johnson - guitar
- Todd Bryant - drums

Former

- B.J. Fontana - drums
- Adam Fontana - bass
- Scott Oxendine - lead guitar

== Discography ==
- Daemos demo (2000)
- The American Plague EP (2001)
- The American Plague / Hellvis split 7-inch (2002)
- RadioDick 3-Sided LP Series (2003)
- The American Plague (Antidote Records promo, 2004)
- God Bless the American Plague (2005 Plague Records, 2006 Dr. Cyclops / Long Live Crime)
- Heart Attack (2008)
- Kiss of Death EP (2009)
- The American Plague / The Undead split 7-inch (2010)
- "Leviathan" single and video (2011)
