= Act Your Rage =

Compilation album by The Undead
- Released: May 8, 1989
- Recorded: 1984–1986
- Genre: Punk rock
- Label: Post Mortem/Forefront
- Producer: Bobby Steele

Act Your Rage is a compilation album by American punk band the Undead. It was released May 8, 1989, on Post Mortem Records/Forefront Records. It featured unreleased songs recorded between 1984 and 1986. Most of the songs were recorded during the recordings of the "Never Say Die" single. There were only 2000 copies distributed in the first release, all on colored vinyl, and were only available at records stores chosen by Bobby Steele. The larger second released included the traditional black vinyl.

== Track listing ==
1. "Evening of Desire" (Bobby Steele)
2. "Hollywood Boulevard" (Steele)
3. "Gimme Your Autograph" (Steele)
4. "The Way We Behave" (Steele/Dave Street)
5. "Eve of Destruction" (Philip Sloan)
6. "Undead" (Steele)
7. "I Don't Wanna Go" (Steele)
8. "We Don't Want the Poor in New York City"
9. "Social Reason" (Steele/Street)
10. "Put Your Clothes Back On" (Steele/Street)
11. "R.A.T.T. F.I.N.K." (Allan Sherman/Wills/Anderson)

== Pressings ==
- Five test copies owned by Bobby Steele
- 2,000-5,000 black vinyl copies
- 1,500 white vinyl copies with blue swirls (teal)
- 1,500 white vinyl copies with red swirls (pink)
- 750 blue vinyl copies
- 750 yellow vinyl copies
- 750 red vinyl copies
- 100 clear vinyl copies
- 53 green vinyl copies
- 30 orange vinyl copies

== Personnel ==
- Bobby Steele – producer, guitar, vocals, bass
- Steve Zing – drums (on tracks 3, 4, 5, 7, 8, 9, 11), backing vocals
- Rich Matalian – drums (on tracks 1, 6, 10)
- Andy Cardenas – drums (on track 2)
- Recorded at Reel Platinum and Centre for Media Arts

== See also ==
Cover Art: Rick "Spine" Mountfort
