= Louis Ricco =

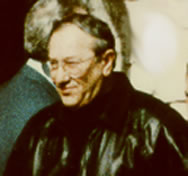
FBI surveillance photograph of Louis Ricco

Louis Peter Ricco (February 13, 1930 – May 22, 2019), also known as Louie Bracciole, was a longtime member of the Gambino crime family, holding the rank of caporegime with illegal activities in the Bronx, New York, New Jersey and Brooklyn, New York.

== Career ==
Louis Ricco was recognized as a caporegime with a crew based in the Bronx since the early 1980s, under the leadership of Paul "Big Paul" Castellano. Ricco resides in Lodi, New Jersey.

On January 21, 1998, Ricco, Junior Gotti, and 38 other Gambino mobsters were indicted on federal racketeering charges. Ricco's charges stemmed from his illegal gambling and loansharking activities. Part of the evidence used against Ricco and Gotti was gathered from listening devices placed under dinner plates in a Queens restaurant. On January 12, 1999, Ricco pleaded guilty to one count of loansharking and was sentenced to 43 months in the Federal Correctional Facility in Otisville. In early 2001, Ricco was released from prison.

On October 17, 2001, Ricco was indicted in New Jersey on third degree conspiracy and third degree promoting gambling. After pleading guilty to the gambling charge, he was sentenced to three years in state prison to run concurrently with his Federal sentence. On December 17, 2003, Ricco, a resident of Lodi, New Jersey, was excluded from the casinos in Atlantic City for his illegal gambling charges.

Louis Ricco died on May 22, 2019, at the age of 89.
