= Lodi, New Jersey =

Borough in New Jersey, United States

- Borough
- Seal

- Location of Lodi in Bergen County highlighted in red (left). Inset map: Location of Bergen County in New Jersey highlighted in orange (right).

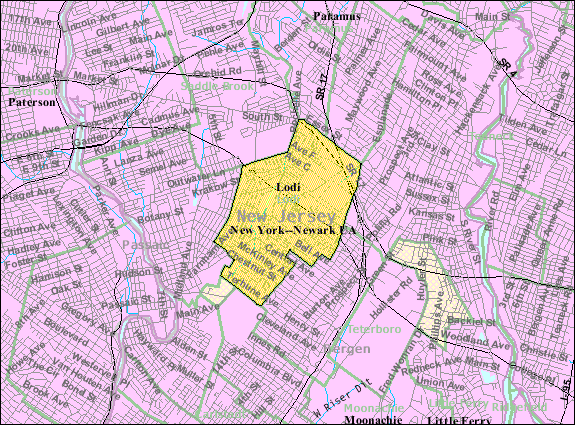
- Census Bureau map of Lodi, New Jersey

- Location in Bergen County Location in New Jersey Location in the United States
- Coordinates: 40.877915°N 74.0825°W
- Country: United States
- State: New Jersey
- County: Bergen
- Incorporated: December 22, 1894
- Named for: Lodi, Lombardy, Italy

Government
  - Type: 1923 Municipal Manager Law
  - Body: Township Council
  - Mayor: Scott A. Luna (term ends June 30, 2027)
  - Manager: Marc N. Schrieks
  - Municipal clerk: Rebecca Paladino

Area
  - Total: 2.29 sq mi (5.93 km^{2})
  - Land: 2.27 sq mi (5.89 km^{2})
  - Water: 0.019 sq mi (0.05 km^{2}) 0.74%
  - Rank: 389th of 565 in state 44th of 70 in county
- Elevation: 30 ft (9.1 m)

Population (2020)
  - Total: 26,207
  - Estimate (2024): 26,358
  - Rank: 98th of 565 in state 9th of 70 in county
  - Density: 11,534.3/sq mi (4,453.4/km^{2})
  - Rank: 30th of 565 in state 9th of 70 in county
- Time zone: UTC−05:00 (Eastern (EST))
  - Summer (DST): UTC−04:00 (Eastern (EDT))
- ZIP Code: 07644
- Area codes: 201 and 973
- FIPS code: 3400341100
- GNIS feature ID: 885284
- Website: lodi-nj.org

Lodi (English pronunciation: /ˈloʊdaɪ/) is a borough in Bergen County, New Jersey, United States. As of the 2020 United States census, the borough's population was 26,207, an increase of 2,070 (+8.6%) from the 2010 census count of 24,136, which in turn reflected an increase of 165 (+0.7%) from the 23,971 counted in the 2000 census.

Lodi owes its name to the Italian city of Lodi, Lombardy. It was incorporated as a borough on December 22, 1894, from portions of the now-defunct municipalities of Lodi Township (now South Hackensack) and Saddle River Township (now Saddle Brook), at the height of Bergen County's "Boroughitis" phenomenon then sweeping through Bergen County, based on the results of a referendum held on the previous day.

== Geography ==
According to the United States Census Bureau, the borough had a total area of 2.29 square miles (5.93 km^{2}), including 2.27 square miles (5.89 km^{2}) of land and 0.02 square miles (0.05 km^{2}) of water (0.74%). Areas of the borough are prone to flooding during heavy rain.

The borough borders the Bergen County municipalities of Garfield, Hackensack, Hasbrouck Heights, Maywood, Rochelle Park, Saddle Brook, South Hackensack and Wood-Ridge.

== History ==
The borough of Lodi was incorporated in 1894 from portions of the former Lodi Township and Saddle River Township and was a destination for thousands of immigrants to work at mills along the Saddle River.

Multiple dye and chemical factories moved to Lodi after the 1940s, replacing earlier textile factories. In 1995, A lethal explosion at the Napp Technologies plant killed five and injured two. An explosion on the same site in 1969 killed one person and injured seven. Another explosion at the Mallinckrodt Chemical Company in 1973 killed seven workers.

== Demographics ==
Historical population
Census	Pop.	Note	%±
1880	986		—
1890	998		1.2%
1900	1,917		92.1%
1910	4,138		115.9%
1920	8,175		97.6%
1930	11,549		41.3%
1940	11,552		0.0%
1950	15,392		33.2%
1960	23,502		52.7%
1970	25,163		7.1%
1980	23,956		−4.8%
1990	22,355		−6.7%
2000	23,971		7.2%
2010	24,136		0.7%
2020	26,206		8.6%
2024 (est.)	26,358	▲	0.6%
Population sources: 1880–1890; 1890–1920 1890–1910; 1910–1930 1900–2020; 2000 2010 2020

=== Racial and ethnic composition ===
Lodi borough, Bergen County, New Jersey – Racial and ethnic composition Note: the US Census treats Hispanic/Latino as an ethnic category. This table excludes Latinos from the racial categories and assigns them to a separate category. Hispanics/Latinos may be of any race.
Race / Ethnicity (NH = Non-Hispanic)	Pop 2000	Pop 2010	Pop 2020	% 2000	% 2010	% 2020
White alone (NH)	16,277	12,592	10,413	67.90%	52.17%	39.74%
Black or African American alone (NH)	769	1,589	2,020	3.21%	6.58%	7.71%
Native American or Alaska Native alone (NH)	29	31	12	0.12%	0.13%	0.05%
Asian alone (NH)	2,111	2,036	2,194	8.81%	8.44%	8.37%
Native Hawaiian or Pacific Islander alone (NH)	7	10	0	0.03%	0.04%	0.00%
Other race alone (NH)	64	99	203	0.27%	0.41%	0.77%
Mixed race or Multiracial (NH)	405	419	526	1.69%	1.74%	2.01%
Hispanic or Latino (any race)	4,309	7,360	10,838	17.98%	30.49%	41.36%
Total	23,971	24,136	26,206	100.00%	100.00%	100.00%

=== 2020 census ===
As of the 2020 census, Lodi had a population of 26,206. The median age was 38.4 years. 19.9% of residents were under the age of 18 and 15.0% of residents were 65 years of age or older. For every 100 females, there were 91.0 males, and for every 100 females age 18 and over, there were 89.3 males.

There were 9,971 households, of which 31.0% had children under the age of 18 living in them. Of all households, 40.2% were married-couple households, 21.0% were households with a male householder and no spouse or partner present, and 31.7% were households with a female householder and no spouse or partner present. About 29.1% of all households were made up of individuals, and 10.7% had someone living alone who was 65 years of age or older.

There were 10,414 housing units, of which 4.3% were vacant. The homeowner vacancy rate was 0.7% and the rental vacancy rate was 2.8%. 100.0% of residents lived in urban areas, while 0.0% lived in rural areas.

=== 2010 census ===
The 2010 United States census counted 24,136 people, 9,471 households, and 6,109 families in the borough. The population density was 10,657.6 per square mile (4,114.9/km^{2}). There were 10,127 housing units at an average density of 4,471.7 per square mile (1,726.5/km^{2}). The racial makeup was 68.19% (16,459) White, 7.52% (1,816) Black or African American, 0.42% (101) Native American, 8.57% (2,069) Asian, 0.06% (15) Pacific Islander, 11.49% (2,774) from other races, and 3.74% (902) from two or more races. Hispanic or Latino of any race were 30.49% (7,360) of the population.

Of the 9,471 households, 29.2% had children under the age of 18; 42.4% were married couples living together; 16.3% had a female householder with no husband present and 35.5% were non-families. Of all households, 30.0% were made up of individuals and 10.0% had someone living alone who was 65 years of age or older. The average household size was 2.54 and the average family size was 3.18.

21.3% of the population were under the age of 18, 8.6% from 18 to 24, 30.7% from 25 to 44, 26.3% from 45 to 64, and 13.1% who were 65 years of age or older. The median age was 37.7 years. For every 100 females, the population had 90.3 males. For every 100 females ages 18 and older there were 86.7 males.

The Census Bureau's 2006–2010 American Community Survey showed that (in 2010 inflation-adjusted dollars) median household income was $55,541 (with a margin of error of ±$3,430) and the median family income was $65,494 (±$4,924). Males had a median income of $49,002 (±$4,353) versus $37,108 (±$5,243) for females. The per capita income for the borough was $25,910 (±$1,786). About 10.1% of families and 12.9% of the population were below the poverty line, including 20.4% of those under age 18 and 15.5% of those age 65 or over.

Same-sex couples headed 64 households in 2010, an increase from the 44 counted a decade earlier.

=== 2000 census ===
As of the 2000 United States census there were 23,971 people, 9,528 households, and 6,097 families residing in the borough. The population density was 10,590.6 inhabitants per square mile (4,089.1/km^{2}). There were 9,908 housing units at an average density of 4,377.4 per square mile (1,690.1/km^{2}). The racial makeup of the borough was 78.16% White, 3.55% African American, 0.17% Native American, 8.86% Asian, 0.03% Pacific Islander, 6.25% from other races, and 2.97% from two or more races. Hispanic or Latino of any race were 17.98% of the population.

There were 9,528 households, out of which 28.9% had children under the age of 18 living with them, 45.6% were married couples living together, 13.4% had a female householder with no husband present, and 36.0% were non-families. Of all households 30.1% were made up of individuals, and 10.9% had someone living alone who was 65 years of age or older. The average household size was 2.50 and the average family size was 3.16.

In the borough the population was spread out, with 21.3% under the age of 18, 8.2% from 18 to 24, 34.5% from 25 to 44, 21.2% from 45 to 64, and 14.9% who were 65 years of age or older. The median age was 36 years. For every 100 females, there were 90.4 males. For every 100 females age 18 and over, there were 87.0 males.

The median income for a household in the borough was $43,421, and the median income for a family was $51,959. Males had a median income of $38,781 versus $31,253 for females. The per capita income for the borough was $21,667. About 5.3% of families and 8.0% of the population were below the poverty line, including 9.9% of those under age 18 and 9.8% of those age 65 or over.

== Government ==
=== Local government ===
Lodi operates under the 1923 Municipal Manager Law form of New Jersey municipal government. The borough is one of 7 municipalities (of the 564) statewide that use this form of government. The governing body is comprised of five members who are elected at-large on a non-partisan basis as part of the May municipal election to serve four-year terms of office on a concurrent basis. A mayor and deputy mayor are selected by the council from among its members.

The council is an exclusively legislative body, with responsibility for day-to-day operation of the borough assigned to a manager who acts as the municipal chief executive and executes laws and policies, prepares the budget for council consideration and attends and participates at meetings with a voice, but no vote. The manager recommends improvements and implements those approved, as well as oversees contracts and franchises and reports violations. It is the responsibility of the manager to appoint and remove department heads and make all additional appointments not made by the council.

As of 2024, members of the Lodi Township Council are Mayor Scott A. Luna, Deputy Mayor Vincent Martin, Emil Carafa Jr., Joseph P. Leto IV and Bruce T. Masopust, all of whom were initially elected in May 2019, and serve terms of office that expire on June 30, 2027.

Marc N. Schrieks was appointed to a two-year term as Municipal Manager on September 1, 2021.

In January 2016, the Township Council appointed Albert DiChiara to fill the seat vacated by Bruce Masopust when he took office as Borough Manager; DiChiara will serve until a special vote held as part of the November 2016 general election.

In February 2015, the township council selected Emil Carafa Jr., to fill the vacant council seat of Mayor Marc Schrieks, who left office to take a position in the administration of County Executive James J. Tedesco III, while Bruce Masopust was chosen to succeed Schrieks in his role as mayor.

Schrieks was elected by the council as mayor on July 1, 2008, and served until June 30, 2009, making him the youngest person to ever serve as its Mayor. Karen Viscana was the first woman in Lodi history to serve as mayor when she was sworn into office in 2008.

=== Federal, state, and county representation ===
Lodi is located in the 9th Congressional District and is part of New Jersey's 38th state legislative district.

In redistricting following the 2010 census, the borough was in the 5th congressional district, which was in effect from 2013 to 2022. Prior to the 2010 Census, Lodi had been part of the 9th Congressional District, a change made by the New Jersey Redistricting Commission that took effect in January 2013, based on the results of the November 2012 general elections.

For the 119th United States Congress, New Jersey's 9th congressional district is represented by Nellie Pou (D, North Haledon) New Jersey is represented in the United States Senate by Democrats Cory Booker (Newark, term ends 2027) and Andy Kim (Moorestown, term ends 2031).

For the 2026–2027 session, the 38th legislative district of the New Jersey Legislature is represented in the State Senate by Joseph Lagana (D, Paramus) and in the General Assembly by Lisa Swain (D, Fair Lawn) and Chris Tully (D, Bergenfield).

Bergen County is governed by a directly elected County Executive, with legislative functions performed by a Board of County Commissioners comprised of seven members who are elected at-large to three-year terms in partisan elections on a staggered basis, with either two or three seats coming up for election each November; a Chairman and Vice Chairman are selected from among its seven members at a reorganization meeting held every January. As of 2025, the county executive is James J. Tedesco III (D, Paramus), whose four-year term of office ends December 31, 2026.

Bergen County's Commissioners are Chair Mary J. Amoroso (D, Mahwah, 2025), Vice Chair Steven A. Tanelli (D, North Arlington, 2027), Chair Pro Tem Joan Voss (D, Fort Lee, 2026), Rafael Marte (D, Bergenfield, 2026), Germaine M. Ortiz (D, Emerson, 2025), Thomas J. Sullivan Jr. (D, Montvale, 2025) and Tracy Silna Zur (D, Franklin Lakes, 2027).

Bergen County's elected constitutional officials are Clerk John S. Hogan (D, Northvale, 2026), Sheriff Anthony Cureton (D, Englewood, 2027) and Surrogate Michael R. Dressler (D, Cresskill, 2026).

=== Politics ===
As of March 2011, there were a total of 11,177 registered voters in Lodi, of which 4,043 (36.2% vs. 31.7% countywide) were registered as Democrats, 1,324 (11.8% vs. 21.1%) were registered as Republicans and 5,805 (51.9% vs. 47.1%) were registered as Unaffiliated. There were 5 voters registered as Libertarians or Greens. Among the borough's 2010 Census population, 46.3% (vs. 57.1% in Bergen County) were registered to vote, including 58.9% of those ages 18 and over (vs. 73.7% countywide).

Gubernatorial election results for Lodi
Year	Republican		Democratic		Third party(ies)	
Year	No.	%	No.	%	No.	%
2025	2,607	40.48%	3,791	58.86%	43	0.67%
2021	2,175	46.12%	2,516	53.35%	25	0.53%
2017	1,257	33.65%	2,406	64.40%	73	1.95%
2013	2,135	52.01%	1,924	46.87%	46	1.12%
2009	1,834	39.10%	2,651	56.51%	206	4.39%
2005	1,472	31.32%	3,098	65.91%	130	2.77%

In the 2016 presidential election, Democrat Hillary Clinton received 5,395 votes (60.6% vs. 54.2% countywide), ahead of Republican Donald Trump with 3,241 votes (36.4% vs. 41.1%) and other candidates with 266 votes (3.0% vs. 4.6%), among the 9,003 ballots cast by the borough's 13,318 registered voters, for a turnout of 67.6% (vs. 72.5% in Bergen County). In the 2012 presidential election, Democrat Barack Obama received 5,420 votes (67.2% vs. 54.8% countywide), ahead of Republican Mitt Romney with 2,508 votes (31.1% vs. 43.5%) and other candidates with 56 votes (0.7% vs. 0.9%), among the 8,070 ballots cast by the borough's 12,305 registered voters, for a turnout of 65.6% (vs. 70.4% in Bergen County). In the 2008 presidential election, Democrat Barack Obama received 5,174 votes (59.7% vs. 53.9% countywide), ahead of Republican John McCain with 3,358 votes (38.7% vs. 44.5%) and other candidates with 70 votes (0.8% vs. 0.8%), among the 8,667 ballots cast by the borough's 11,983 registered voters, for a turnout of 72.3% (vs. 76.8% in Bergen County). In the 2004 presidential election, Democrat John Kerry received 4,696 votes (57.9% vs. 51.7% countywide), ahead of Republican George W. Bush with 3,344 votes (41.2% vs. 47.2%) and other candidates with 52 votes (0.6% vs. 0.7%), among the 8,115 ballots cast by the borough's 11,598 registered voters, for a turnout of 70.0% (vs. 76.9% in the whole county).

Presidential elections results
Year	Republican	Democratic
2024	50.8% 4,679	46.6% 4,294
2020	38.9% 4,038	59.8% 6,215
2016	36.4% 3,241	60.6% 5,395
2012	31.1% 2,508	67.2% 5,420
2008	38.7% 3,358	59.7% 5,174
2004	41.2% 3,344	57.9% 4,696

In the 2013 gubernatorial election, Republican Chris Christie received 52.0% of the vote (2,135 cast), ahead of Democrat Barbara Buono with 46.9% (1,924 votes), and other candidates with 1.1% (46 votes), among the 4,256 ballots cast by the borough's 11,672 registered voters (151 ballots were spoiled), for a turnout of 36.5%. In the 2009 gubernatorial election, Democrat Jon Corzine received 2,651 ballots cast (56.2% vs. 48.0% countywide), ahead of Republican Chris Christie with 1,834 votes (38.9% vs. 45.8%), Independent Chris Daggett with 173 votes (3.7% vs. 4.7%) and other candidates with 33 votes (0.7% vs. 0.5%), among the 4,720 ballots cast by the borough's 11,546 registered voters, yielding a 40.9% turnout (vs. 50.0% in the county).

United States Senate election results for Lodi1
Year	Republican		Democratic		Third party(ies)	
Year	No.	%	No.	%	No.	%
2024	3,977	46.50%	4,237	49.54%	339	3.96%
2018	2,007	34.37%	3,616	61.93%	216	3.70%
2012	2,098	29.26%	4,961	69.19%	111	1.55%
2006	1,522	34.90%	2,776	63.66%	63	1.44%

United States Senate election results for Lodi2
Year	Republican		Democratic		Third party(ies)	
Year	No.	%	No.	%	No.	%
2020	3,483	34.86%	6,196	62.02%	311	3.11%
2014	1,124	33.69%	2,149	64.42%	63	1.89%
2013	871	37.87%	1,407	61.17%	22	0.96%
2008	2,432	33.25%	4,779	65.34%	103	1.41%

== Emergency services ==
The Lodi Police Department operates out of the Borough Hall. The police department has 47 sworn officers. The department is broken into several Divisions including; Patrol Division, Detective Division, Records, Traffic, and Operation/Community Policing. The current Department's Chief of Police is Acting Chief Donald Scorzetti.

The Fire Department is staffed by approximately 81 volunteer firefighters consisting of four different companies with three firehouses throughout the borough.

The Lodi Fire Department responds to about 500+ calls per year, including mutual aid to neighboring municipalities including Garfield, Saddle Brook, Hasbrouck Heights, Rochelle Park, Maywood, Elmwood Park, Wallington and other South Bergen towns when needed.

The Lodi Volunteer Ambulance and Rescue Squad was established in 1962. LVARS renders aid with three Type III ambulances; EMS 1, 2, and 3, as well as a Fire Rehab Unit (Rehab 4). LVARS responds to roughly 2,000 requests for aid per year.

== Education ==
The Lodi Public Schools serve students in pre-kindergarten through twelfth grade. As of the 2021–22 school year, the district, comprised of seven schools, had an enrollment of 3,213 students and 233.5 classroom teachers (on an FTE basis), for a student–teacher ratio of 13.8:1. Schools in the district (with 2021–22 enrollment data from the National Center for Education Statistics) are Columbus Elementary School with 244 students in grades K-5, Hilltop Elementary School with 290 students in grades PreK-5, Roosevelt Elementary School with 182 students in grades PreK-5, Washington Elementary School with 338 students in grades PreK-5, Wilson Elementary School with 347 students in grades PreK-5, Thomas Jefferson Middle School with 709 students in grades 6-8 and Lodi High School with 916 students in grades 9-12.

Bergen Arts and Science Charter School serves public school students from Lodi, as well as those from Garfield and Hackensack.

Public school students from the borough, and all of Bergen County, are eligible to attend the secondary education programs offered by the Bergen County Technical Schools, which include the Bergen County Academies in Hackensack, and the Bergen Tech campus in Teterboro or Paramus. The district offers programs on a shared-time or full-time basis, with admission based on a selective application process and tuition covered by the student's home school district.

Immaculate Conception High School was an all-girls college-preparatory high school founded in 1915 by the Felician Sisters that operated under the jurisdiction of the Roman Catholic Archdiocese of Newark, until it closed at the end of the 2022-23 school year due to a drop inenrollment and the cost of needed facility improvements.

Felician University, an independent Catholic institution, is located in Lodi, and also has a satellite campus in nearby Rutherford that opened in 1997.

== Transportation ==
=== Roads and highways ===
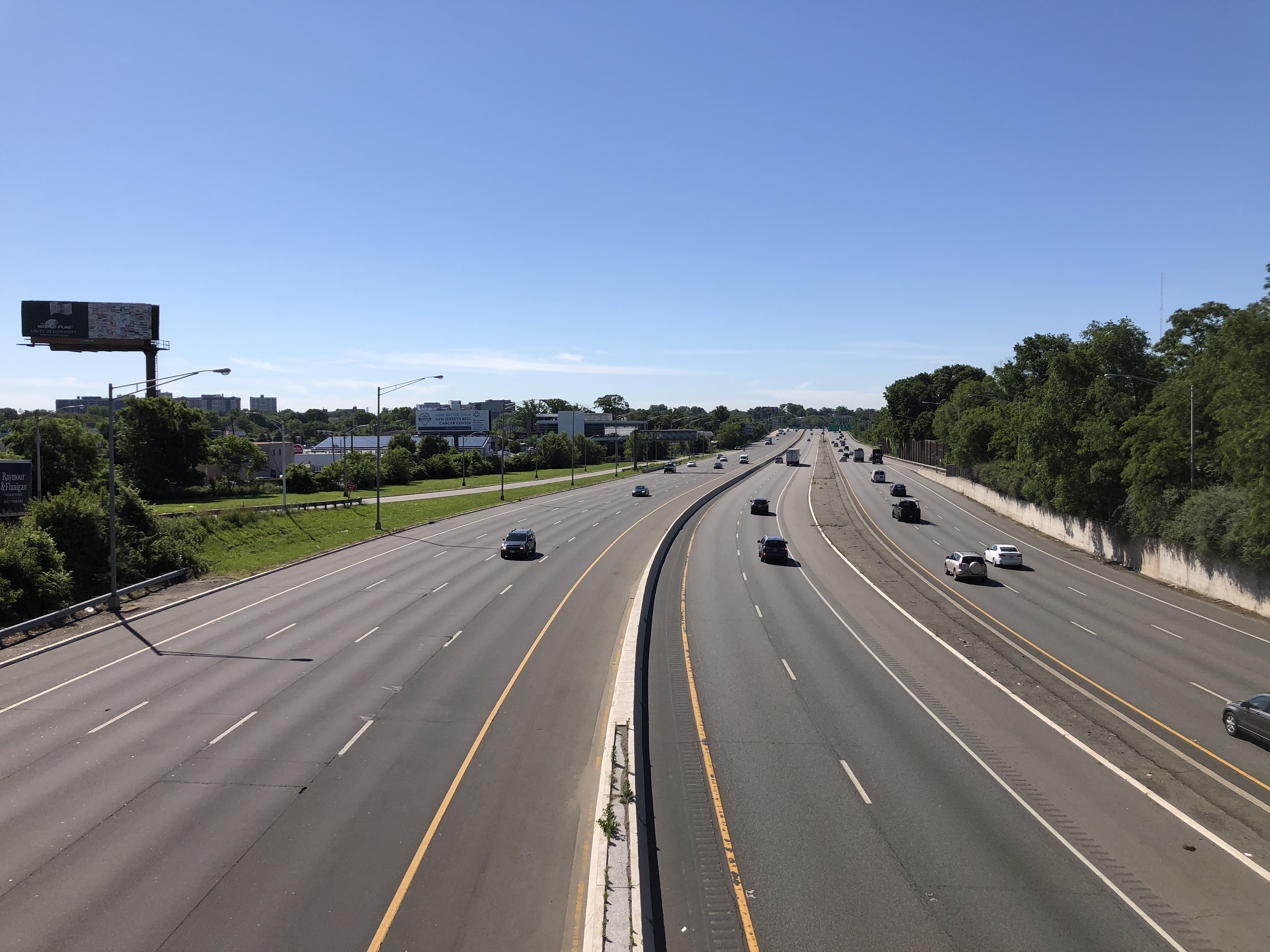
Interstate 80 eastbound in Lodi

As of May 2010, the borough had a total of 40.00 miles (64.37 km) of roadways, of which 32.24 miles (51.89 km) were maintained by the municipality, 4.56 miles (7.34 km) by Bergen County and 3.20 miles (5.15 km) by the New Jersey Department of Transportation.

Route 17, U.S. Route 46 and Interstate 80 pass through Lodi.

=== Public transportation ===
NJ Transit bus routes 144, 161 and 164 offer service between the borough and the Port Authority Bus Terminal in Midtown Manhattan, while 709, 712 and 780 provide local service.

In the past Lodi was served by the Lodi Branch Railroad and its successor, the Hackensack and Lodi Railroad, both associated with the Erie Railroad.

== In media and popular culture ==
Lodi is home to the transmitter and towers for New York radio station WABC.

In the HBO crime drama The Sopranos, the Satin Dolls go-go bar in Lodi was used as the filming location for the fictional Bada Bing bar. Lodi High School, various stores and houses, and Route 17 in the borough were also featured as the series was largely filmed on location in North Jersey.

The Broadway musical Kimberly Akimbo is set in Bergen County, and various places in the county are referenced throughout the play. The Levaco family, the family of protagonist Kimberly, lived in Lodi.

== Notable people ==
People who were born in, residents of, or otherwise closely associated with Lodi include:

- Frederick Behne (1873–1918), fireman first class serving in the United States Navy who received the Medal of Honor for bravery
- Joan Berger (1933–2021), infielder and outfielder who played in the All-American Girls Professional Baseball League
- Frank Cannova (1911–2005), hotelier, businessman and entrepreneur
- Anthony Castellito (disappeared 1961), labor official who served as secretary-treasurer of Teamsters Local 560
- Brian Cina, politician who serves in the Vermont House of Representatives
- Richard Cottingham (born 1946), convicted serial killer and rapist nicknamed the Torso Killer and Times Square Torso Ripper
- James Guarantano (born 1969), former wide receiver for the NFL's San Diego Chargers and the CFL's Baltimore Stallions
- Jarrett Guarantano (born 1997), American football quarterback who played in the NFL for the Arizona Cardinals
- Howie Janotta (1924–2010), basketball player who played for the Baltimore Bullets
- Al Jochim (1902–1980), gymnast who won two silver medals in gymnastics at the 1932 Summer Olympics in Los Angeles
- Joe Maniaci (1914–1996), football player and coach who played in the National Football League (NFL) with the Brooklyn Dodgers and the Chicago Bears
- Dean Obeidallah (born 1969), comedian
- Louis Ricco (1929–2019), caporegime of the Gambino crime family
- Rich Skrosky (born 1964), football player and coach
- Nathan Sonenshein (1915–2001), rear admiral in the United States Navy
- Bobby "Werner" Strete (born 1966 as Robert Ahrendt), bass player for indie rock bands Mod Fun and Crocodile Shop
- Spann Watson (1916–2014), Tuskegee Airman

Several members of the punk rock band, Misfits, as well as several associated acts, were Lodi residents, including:

- Glenn Danzig (born 1955), singer and songwriter Also singer and songwriter in the bands Samhain and Danzig
- Jerry Only (born 1959), bass player and vocalist
- Doyle Wolfgang von Frankenstein (born 1964), guitarist
- Dr. Chud (Born 1964), former drummer
- Mr. Jim (born 1954), former drummer
- Franché Coma (born 1957), former guitarist
- Eerie Von (born 1964), former bass guitar player for Samhain and Danzig
- Steve Zing (born 1964), former drummer for Samhain and The Undead, bassist for Danzig

== Chemical plant explosion ==
In April 1995, the Napp Technologies chemical plant in downtown Lodi suffered an explosion that killed four workers and injured others in the area of the plant.

== Sources ==
- Municipal Incorporations of the State of New Jersey (according to Counties) prepared by the Division of Local Government, Department of the Treasury (New Jersey); December 1, 1958.
- Clayton, W. Woodford; and Nelson, William. History of Bergen and Passaic Counties, New Jersey, with Biographical Sketches of Many of its Pioneers and Prominent Men. Philadelphia: Everts and Peck, 1882.
- Harvey, Cornelius Burnham (ed.), Genealogical History of Hudson and Bergen Counties, New Jersey. New York: New Jersey Genealogical Publishing Co., 1900.
- Van Valen, James M. History of Bergen County, New Jersey. New York: New Jersey Publishing and Engraving Co., 1900.
- Westervelt, Frances A. (Frances Augusta), 1858–1942, History of Bergen County, New Jersey, 1630–1923, Lewis Historical Publishing Company, 1923.
