= Live Slayer =

Live album by The Undead
- Released: 1992
- Genre: Punk rock
- Label: Skreamin' Skull Records/Skyclad Records

Live Slayer is a live album by American punk band the Undead, released in 1992 by Skreamin' Skull Records/Skyclad Records. Its title is a parody of Slayer's Live Undead.

== Track listing ==
1. "When the Evening Comes"
2. "In Eighty Four"
3. "Verbal Abuse"
4. "Eve of Destruction"
5. "My Kinda Town"
6. "I Want You Dead"
7. "Evening of Desire"
8. "Bullet"
9. "We Don't Want the Poor in New York City"
10. "Misfit"
11. "Social Reason"
12. "Put Your Clothes Back On"
13. "A Life of Our Own"
14. "Undead"
15. "R.A.T.T. F.I.N.K." (vinyl edition only)
16. "All You Need Is Love" (vinyl edition only)
