= Willie Ashley =

American Tuskegee Airman fighter pilot (t1921–1984)

- Born: Willie Lee Ashley Jr. May 23, 1921; Sumter, South Carolina, US
- Died: February 9, 1984 (aged 62); Washington, D.C., US
- Resting place: Arlington National Cemetery
- Education: University of Omaha, Catholic University
- Occupations: Military officer; fighter pilot
- Years active: 1942–1981

Willie Lee Ashley Jr. (May 23, 1921 – February 9, 1984) was a U.S. Army Air Force officer and combat fighter pilot with the 332nd Fighter Group's 99th Fighter Squadron, best known as the Tuskegee Airmen.

Ashley was the first African American U.S. military pilot to engage in aerial combat against an enemy combatant, sharing this honor with 99th Fighter Squadron pilots Sidney P. Brooks, Charles Dryden (Tuskegee Airman), Lee Rayford, Leon C. Roberts and Spann Watson who all engaged against enemy German fighter aircraft on June 9, 1943.

== Early life ==
Ashley was born on May 23, 1921, in Crocketville, South Carolina, in Hampton County. After graduating from Morris College High School, Ashley attended Hampton Institute, now Hampton University in Hampton, Virginia. While at Hampton, Ashley enrolled with the Civil Air Patrol's Civilian Pilot Training Program, earning his pilot's license.

== Military service ==
The U.S. Army Air Corps admitted Ashley to its Advanced Flight School at Tuskegee Air Force Field. On July 3, 1942, Ashley graduated as a member of the Single Engine Section Cadet Class SE-42-F, receiving his wings and commission as a 2nd Lieutenant.

During World War II, Ashley flew 77 combat missions over a 14-month period, including missions in North Africa, Sicily, and France. Though he was credited with two kills, the U.S. Army Air Corps did not credit Ashley for a third kill allegedly based on material provided by Shaw Air Force Base.

On June 9, 1943, Ashley and fellow 99th Fighter Squadron pilots Sidney P. Brooks, Charles Dryden, Lee Rayford, Leon Roberts and Spann Watson became the first African American fighter pilots in history to engage in aerial combat.

After World War II, Ashley returned to the United States and continued his military service as a member of the U.S. Air Force Reserve. In 1981, he retired from the military with the rank of Lt Colonel.

== Post-World War II education ==
Ashley earned a bachelor's degree from the University of Omaha and a master's degree in parasitology from Catholic University. He also earned a PhD in radiation biology from Catholic University.

On March 1, 1947, Ashley was initiated as a member of Kappa Alpha Psi fraternity, Alpha Eta chapter at the University of Nebraska at Omaha.

Ashley worked for the Food and Drug Administration, the US Department of Defense, and the Environmental Protection Agency where he retired as an administrator in 1976. He also served as a professor at Howard University, retiring in 1983 after experiencing serious health issues.

== Death ==
On February 9, 1984, Ashley died at the Georgetown Medical Center in Washington, D.C. He was interred at Arlington National Cemetery, Section 65, Site 3622, in Arlington, Virginia.

== Legacy ==
- The Shaw Air Force Base officials renamed a road within the base the “Ashley-Bowman Boulevard" for Ashley and 1st Sgt. Leroy Bowman, both Sumter, South Carolina, natives who served with the Tuskegee Airmen.

== See also ==
- Executive Order 9981
- List of Tuskegee Airmen
- List of Tuskegee Airmen Cadet Pilot Graduation Classes
- Military history of African Americans
