= The Undead =

American horror punk band

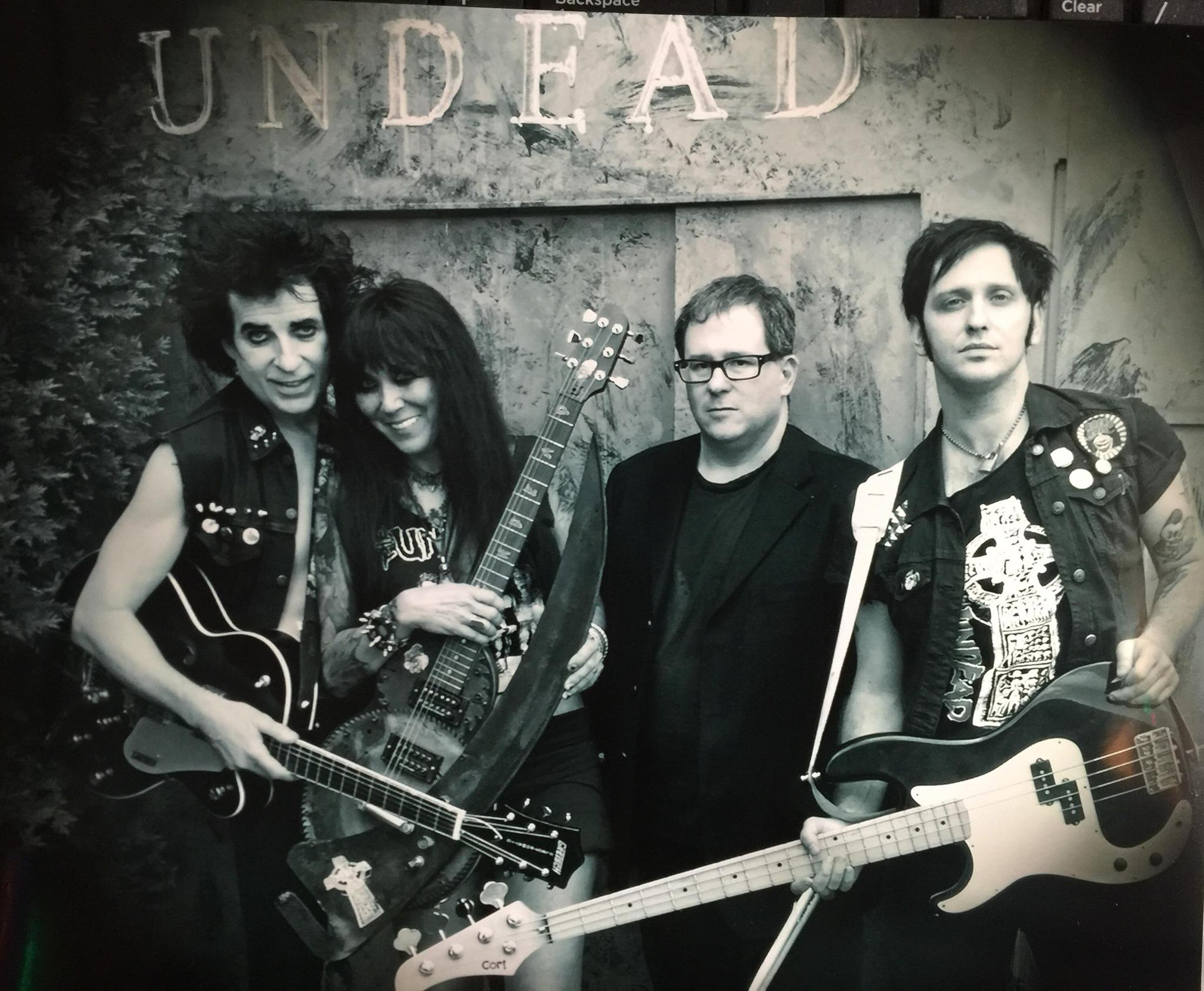
- The Undead in 2018. From left to right: Bobby Steele, Diana Steele, Joe Stoker, and Tristan D'Graves.

Background information
- Origin: New York City, U.S.
- Genres: Horror punk, punk rock, hardcore punk
- Years active: 1980–present
- Labels: Stiff, Post Mortem
- Members: Bobby Steele; Diana Steele; Joe Stoker; Tristan D'Graves
- Past members: See below

The Undead is an American horror punk band formed in 1980 in New York City's East Village by Bobby Steele (vocals and guitar), Chris "Jack" Natz (bass) and Patrick Blanck (drums). They were one of the pioneers in the New York hardcore scene.

== History ==
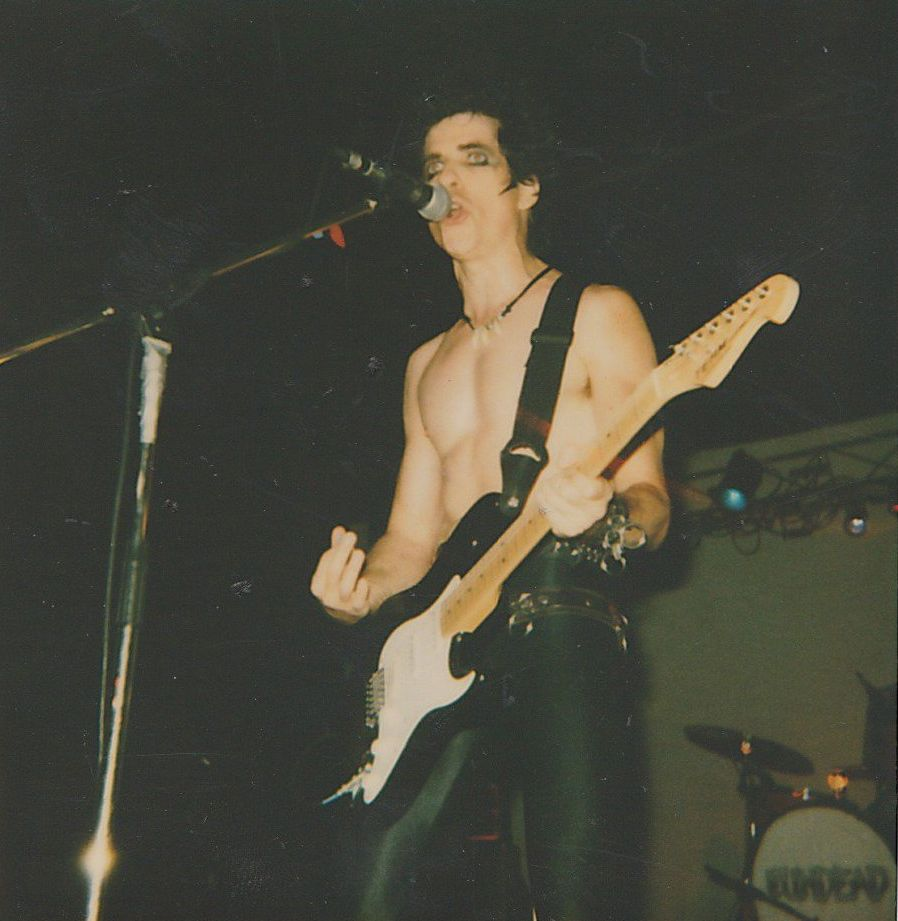
The Undead live in Indianapolis, Indiana, 2000

Steele (then of the Misfits) and Natz had been playing with drummer Richie Matalia as a side project called the Skabs. When Matalia departed and Steele left the Misfits, the trio of Steele, Natz and Patrick Blanck formed the Undead in October 1980.

In June 1982, the Undead released their first EP, 9 Toes Later, and were featured on the ROIR New York Thrash compilation. A few months later Natz and Blanck left the band; Natz later played in Virus, the Blacksnakes and Cop Shoot Cop. They were replaced by Brian "Payne" Aliano on bass and Bobby Savage on drums, and this lineup released the "Verbal Abuse" single in 1983. Steve Zing (of Mourning Noise and later Samhain) then took over as drummer. Between 1983 and 1986, Aliano and Zing performed with the band intermittently, while many other musicians played in the Undead for short periods. Aliano and Zing finally quit the band in December 1986. Later full-length studio albums included Act Your Rage (1989), Til Death (1998) and Dawn of the Undead (1991).

The Undead went on hiatus from live performance between late 2002 and early 2006.

The Undead returned to the music scene in 2006 with a lineup of Steele on guitar and vocals, Joel Gausten on drums and Joff Wilson on bass. They played CBGB on Saint Patrick's Day as well as a free show at Tompkins Square Park in June of that year. September 2006 saw the remastered rerelease of Dawn of the Undead. Wilson left the band in July 2007, and Gausten in September 2008.

The Undead recorded their own full-album cover version of the "lost" Misfits album, 12 Hits from Hell, and made the recording available as a stream on the band's website on October 31, 2007. This release was quickly followed by a new single, a cover of the Misfits' "Halloween", on Germany's No Balls Records.

Steele released a solo album called Bobby in 2009. He reformed the Undead again in late 2012 with Paul Mauled (bass), Serial Bill Gotta (drums) (of the Bad Whoremoans) and Diana Steele (keys and vocals). In 2015, Boris was recruited to play drums. The band released the album, The Morgue... The Merrier, in October 2015. In 2016, Joe Stoker took over on drums. From 2016 to 2018, the band saw a few bassists come and go and in 2018, Tristan D'Graves stepped up to round out the current lineup. On October 3, 2017, the Undead released the Having an Undead Summer EP.

== Band members ==
Current lineup

- Bobby Steele – guitar, vocals, bass (1980–present)
- Diana Steele – guitar, vocals, keyboards (2014–present)
- Mykell J Gossinger (drums, 2025-present)
- Jason Fresta (bass, vocals 2017–2018, 2022-present)

Former members

Guitarists

- Eddie Van Migraine (August 1996)
- Bryce Bernius (July 21, 2000)
- Shawn Browning (three shows in 2014)

Bassists

- Chris "Jack" Natz (1980–1982)
- Brian "Payne" Aliano (on and off between 1982 and 1986)
- John Fiore (1986)
- West Rocker (1987, 1988)
- Pete Lisa (1987)
- Tim Taylor (1988–1990)
- Rich Pressley (1990)
- Jim Joyce (1990–1992)
- Phil Portuesi (1993)
- Brian (1993)
- Anthony D'Amico (1993–1995)
- Jay Von Hack (1996)
- Will Harper (1997, 1998)
- Danny Duke (Mr. D) (1998)
- Ian Lawrence (on and off between 1998 and 2000)
- Rahne Pistor (on and off between 1998 and 1999)
- Bryce Bernius (on and off between 2000 and 2006)
- Roxy Michaels (2002)
- J~Sin Trioxin (2002)
- Argyle Goolsby (2002)
- Joff Wilson (2006–2007)
- Hiromu C Yanagiya (2008–2011)
- Zombie Alex Kopec (2010–2011)
- Paul Mauled (2007, 2012–2016)
- Ryan Rattcliff (2016–2017)
- Johnny James Gatyas (2017–2018)
- Tristan D'Graves – bass, vocals (2018-2022)
- Andre Radeljic a.k.a. CerberusMuzak (bass and backing vocals for Bat Fest at Debonair Music Hall, 2023 *NOTE: Mykell J Gossinger’s first show with the band on drums)

Drummers

- Patrick Blanck (1980–1982)
- Bobby Savage (1982–1983)
- Steve Zing (on and off between 1983 and 1986)
- Rich Matalian (1986)
- Stacey Morris (1987)
- Tony DiLeo (1988–1989)
- Eddie Enzyme (1989–1990)
- Steve Sloppy (1990, see Sloppy Seconds)
- Joe Darone (1990–1992)
- Jeff O'Hara (1993, 1993–1994)
- Ratty (1993)
- John Rosado (1994–1995)
- Atom Cheeze (1996)
- Mormo Stinkbat (1997, 1998)
- Sébastien DeChamplain (1998)
- Gram Slam (on and off between 1998 and 1999)
- James "Jaw" Alexander (1999–2000)
- Joey Image (2000–2002)
- Angel Bartolotta (2001)
- Joel Gausten (1998–1999, 2002, 2006–2008)
- Hitomi (2008–2010)
- Serial Bill Gotta (2010–2015)
- Boris (2015–2016, 2017)
- Joe Stoker – drums, backing vocals (2016–2020)
- Andre Radeljic a.k.a. CerberusMuzak (Feb-Oct 2023, drums for 3 shows: Church of the Nazarene in Butler, NJ, QXT’s in Newark, NJ, and Chiller Theater Expo at the Hilton Hotel in Parsippany, NJ.)

== Discography ==
=== Studio albums ===
- Never Say Die – LP (1986); cassette (1987)
- Act Your Rage – LP, cassette (1989)
- Til Death – LP, CD (1998)
- 12 Hits from Hell – Uncovered – digital-only (2007)
- Bobby (aka Bobby Steele) – LP, CD (2009)
- The Morgue... The Merrier – LP, CD (2015)

=== Compilation albums ===
- Dawn of the Undead – LP, CD, cassette (1991); remastered CD (2006)
- The Undead – Cassette (1995)
- Still the Undead After All These Years – CD, LP (2007)

=== Live albums ===
- Live Slayer – LP, CD, cassette (1992)

=== EPs ===
- 9 Toes Later – 7-inch EP (1982)
- Evening of Desire – 12-inch EP (1992)
- Times Square – split 7-inch EP (2000)
- Third World USA – 7-inch EP (2002)
- Rock 'N' Roll Whore – 7-inch EP (2002)
- Be My Ghoul Tonight – 7-inch EP (2003)
- I Made a Monster – 7-inch/CD EP (2009)
- Having an Undead Summer - 7-inch/CD EP (2017)

=== Singles ===
- "Verbal Abuse" – 7-inch single (1983)
- "Never Say Die" – 7-inch single (1985)
- "Invisible Man" – 7-inch single (1992)
- "Evening of Desire" – 12-inch single (1992)
- "There's a Riot in Tompkins Square" – 7-inch single (1993)
- "Halloween" – 7-inch single (2007)
