= Son of Sam (band) =

American horror punk band

- Origin: Los Angeles, California, U.S.
- Genres: Horror punk, heavy metal, hardcore punk, deathrock
- Years active: 2000–2001, 2007–2008, 2020, 2024
- Labels: Horror High, Nitro
- Spinoff of: Samhain, AFI
- Past members: Davey Havok; Todd Youth; London May; Karl Rosqvist; Steve Zing; Ian Thorne; Colin Young; Taylor Young

Son of Sam was an American horror punk band that is a side project created by Todd Youth in 2000, during his tenure as the guitarist for Danzig. The band's initial line up featured members of Samhain, Danzig, and AFI. Much like its members' other work, Son of Sam plays in the horror punk style, and also infuses metal and deathrock elements into their music. The name of the band was inspired by the serial killer David Berkowitz, known by the pseudonym "Son of Sam". This also draws reference to the band Samhain.

== History ==
In 1999, Youth was invited by Glenn Danzig to fill in the guitar position for the Samhain reunion tour, replacing Samhain's original guitarist, Pete "Damien" Marshall, who had opted out in order to tour with Iggy Pop. Playing guitar for the Samhain reunion inspired Youth to write an album worth of Samhain influenced music. Youth then contacted Steve Zing and London May (both ex-Samhain members), who were impressed with what Todd had written, and agreed to help him record an album. The project was dubbed "Son of Sam," a nod to the fact that the band was spawned out of the Samhain reunion. Davey Havok, whose band, AFI, had opened for the Samhain reunion tour, was invited to write lyrics and record vocals for the album, since it was well known that Havok was a Samhain fan.

In a short amount of time, they recorded an album of 10 tracks called Songs from the Earth and released it on Nitro Records in 2001 . "To me, doing this record was sort of a tribute to Samhain. Playing guitar for Samhain on the reunion tour was such an honor. I had forgotten how much I love and respect the band," Youth stated. The album featured guest guitar and keyboard from Glenn Danzig on the tracks Stray and Songs From The Earth.

In December 2007, messages on the Horror High website indicated that a follow-up record was being made. Davey Havok did not return on vocals as, although he had said numerous times that he would love to make a new Son of Sam album, he was too busy with commitments to AFI's record label, Interscope. Todd Youth released a statement saying while Havok would not be doing vocals, he had given the rest of the band his full blessing in seeking a replacement vocalist.

Youth enlisted the talents of Chelsea Smiles bandmate Sky Vaughan-Jayne (real name Jonathan Ian Skye Jayne, and in this incarnation, Ian Thorne) to take up Havok's former mantle, and the band signed to Horror High records. The second album Into the Night was recorded and released in 2008. With the release of the second LP they embarked on a small American tour.

Todd Youth died on October 27, 2018.

On March 24, 2020, the band's Facebook page posted a link to their website, where a page was titled "Son of Sam returns: 2020–2021" and Ian Thorne and Steve Zing were listed as current members. There were no further updates. In 2024, London May and Steve Zing approached brothers Colin and Taylor Young of Twitching Tongues and God's Hate to be members in a reunited Son of Sam. This reunion did not come to fruition except for a demo recording of "Michael".

== Band members ==
- Davey Havok – vocals (2000–2001)
- Todd Youth – guitars (2000–2001, 2007–2008; died 2018)
- London May – drums (2000–2001, 2024)
- Steve Zing – bass (2000–2001, 2007–2008, 2020, 2024)
- Ian Thorne – vocals (2007–2008, 2020)
- Karl Rosqvist – drums (2007–2008)
- Colin Young – vocals (2024)
- Taylor Young – guitar (2024)

== Discography ==
=== Albums ===
- Songs from the Earth (2001)
- Into the Night (2008)

=== Other ===
- Son of Sam (2001) – promotional CD intended for radio play featuring "Songs from the Earth" and "Satiate"
- Punkzilla: The Compilation (2002) – Nitro Records compilation featuring "Michael"
