= Dawn of the Undead =

Studio album by The Undead
- Released: 1991
- Genre: Punk rock
- Label: Shagpile Records

Dawn of the Undead is an album by American punk band the Undead, originally released on vinyl in 1991 on the Australian label Shagpile Records. It was reissued on CD in 1997 and again in 2006 by Post Mortem Records.

== Track listing (LP edition) ==
1. Evening of Desire
2. A Life of Our Own
3. Never Say Die
4. Gimme Your Autograph
5. I Don't Wanna Go
6. In Eighty Four
7. The Way We Behave
8. Put Your Clothes Back On
9. R.A.T.T.F.I.N.K.
10. I Want You Dead
11. We Don't Want the Poor in New York City
12. When the Evening Comes
13. Verbal Abuse (Remix)
14. My Kinda Town
15. Undead

== Track listing (CD edition) ==
1. Evening of Desire
2. A Life of Our Own
3. Never Say Die
4. Gimme Your Autograph
5. I Don't Wanna Go
6. In Eighty Four
7. The Way We Behave
8. Put Your Clothes Back On
9. R.A.T.T.F.I.N.K.
10. I Want You Dead
11. We Don't Want the Poor in New York City
12. When the Evening Comes
13. Verbal Abuse
14. My Kinda Town
15. Hollywood Boulevard
16. Undead
17. Social Reason
18. No Vices
19. Nightmare
20. Lies
21. Eve of Destruction
22. Misfit
