= Horror punk =

Music genre

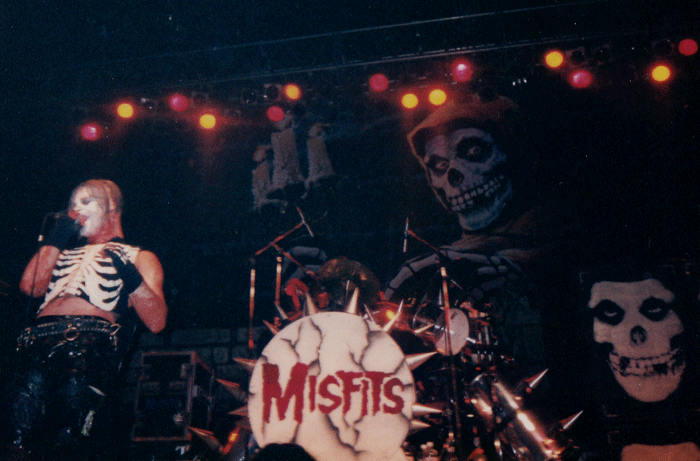
- American horror punk band The Misfits performing live in 1998
- Stylistic origins: Punk rock; rockabilly; doo-wop; horror films
- Cultural origins: Late 1970s, New Jersey, U.S.

Local scenes
- Southampton

Other topics
- Death rock; gothabilly; hardcore punk; horrorcore; psychobilly; shock rock

Horror punk is a music genre that mixes punk rock and 1950s-influenced doo-wop and rockabilly sounds with morbid and violent imagery and lyrics which are often influenced by horror films and science fiction B-movies. The genre was pioneered by the Misfits during the late 1970s to early 1980s, followed by bands such as Mourning Noise, the Undead and Samhain.

By the late 1990s to early 2000s, the genre gained wider prominence through the Misfits' reunion tour, as well as the success of groups like AFI, Son of Sam and the Murderdolls, which was then later proliferated by the formation of Blitzkid, Calabrese and Creeper.

== Characteristics ==
Horror punk is defined by its fusion of punk rock music with the imagery and lyrical topics common in the horror film genre. Typically it references B movies, doing so in a way that emphasises cheesiness. Due to this, horror punk generally eschews the political lyrics found in conventional punk rock. The genre also asserts the influence of 1950s–inspired doo-wop and rockabilly sounds.

During the earliest stages of the gothic rock genre, "horror punk" was one term often misapplied to the genre. While both horror punk and gothic rock pull from many of the same points of reference, and sometimes early horror punk groups, particularly the Misfits, are themselves cited as being "proto-gothic", the two genres are distinctly separate by modern definitions. However, the gothic rock genre death rock, with its emphasis on influence from punk rock, contains significant overlap with horror punk. Although, death rock lacks horror punk's rockabilly and doo-wop influences, instead paying a greater attention to musical atmospheres. Psychobilly is also a closely related style to horror punk, particularly during the 2000s when the genres became increasingly intertwined. In an article by Kerrang!, writer Chris Krovatin stated that "the two [genres] have become so accepting of one another, that to make the distinction feels like splitting hairs". Some psychobilly groups even take influence from horror punk imagery, notably Tiger Army.

== Etymology ==
According to CVLT Nation writer Oliver Sheppard, Screaming Dead are "often credited with coining the term horror punk", using it in early advertisements and posters, such as for their 1982 single "Valley of the Dead". Subsequently, the Guardian referred to the American punk rock band Misfits as "horror-punk" in an article published in 1991.

== History ==
=== Forerunners ===
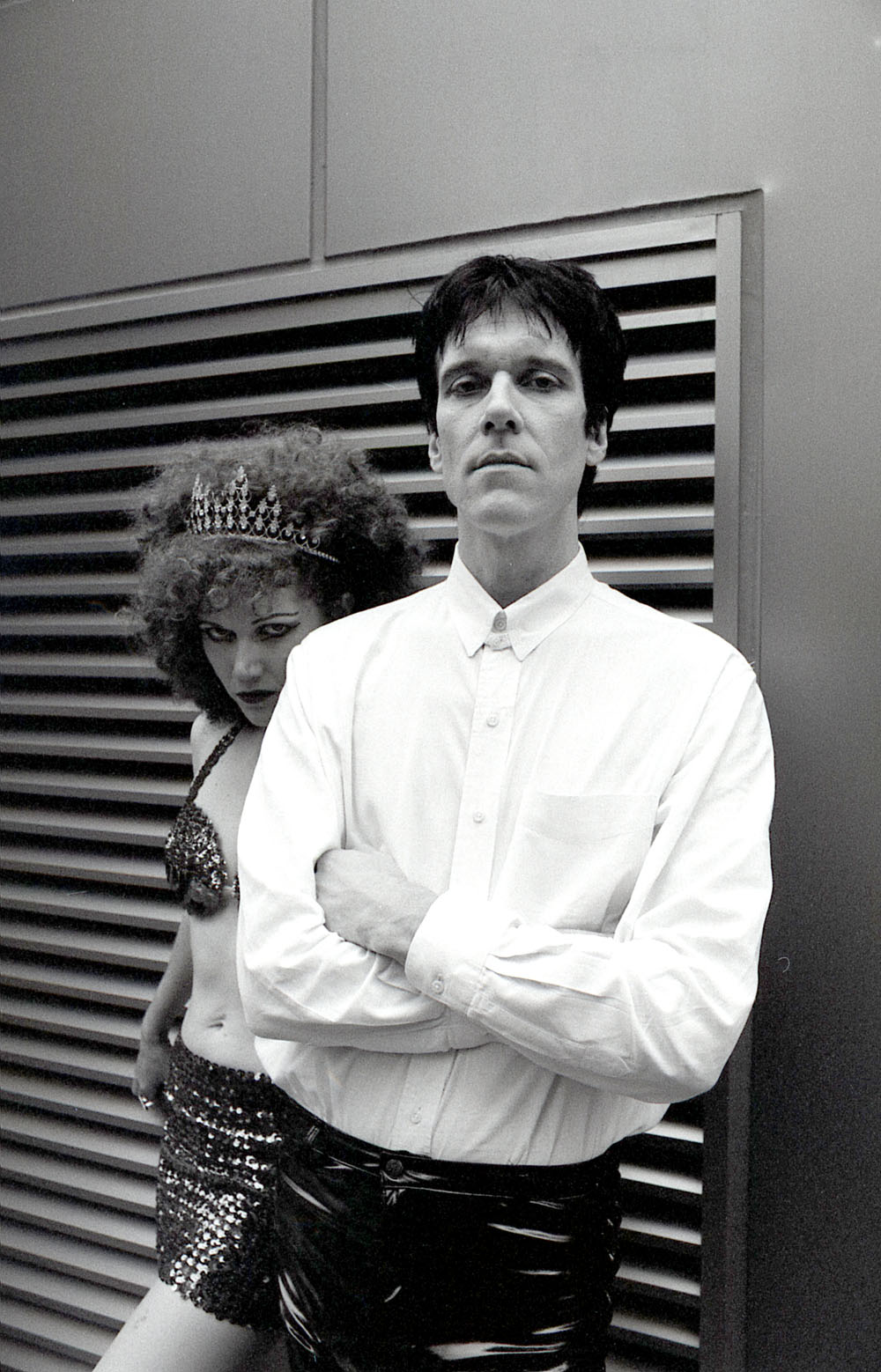
The Cramps, a key influence on the development of horror punk

The meeting of horror imagery and rock music has existed since the genre's earliest years. 1950s rock and roll singer Screamin' Jay Hawkins and his single "I Put a Spell on You" is a prominent example of this, through its illusions to voodoo. Additionally, teenage tragedy songs such as "Teen Angel", "Endless Sleep" and "Moody River", were a popular style of songwriting which emphasised horror during the 1950s and 1960s. These elements continued into the 70s with the advent of glam rock and heavy metal.

By the early 1970s, groups such as Alice Cooper and Black Sabbath employed horror themes extensively throughout their discography, with the latter's lead singer Ozzy Osbourne, later describing the band as "horror-rock" in 1986.

In 1976, the Cramps formed in New York City, blending the sound of punk rock with rockabilly and cult horror movies, particularly those shown on Ghoulardi's Shock Theater. Their style which would later be influential in the development of psychobilly. Furthermore, the Damned one of the earliest English punk rock bands made use of a horror influenced aesthetic. In particular, the band's vocalist David Vanian shaped his stage persona around the 1931 film Dracula and its leading actor Bela Lugosi.

Additionally, American magazine Alternative Press retroactively labelled Roky Erickson's 1980 album The Evil One, as a precursor to horror punk.

=== Origins (1970s–1980s) ===
The Misfits formed in 1977 and began creating music influenced by the then-burgeoning punk rock scene. After recording the album Static Age in 1978, they began writing music inspired by science fiction and B-movie horrors. At the same time, they began using the titular character from the Crimson Ghost (1946) as their logo, wearing makeup, clothes with skeleton patterns during performances and employed a style of hair inspired by Eddie Munster that they came to term a "devilock". Through this stylistic shift, they laid the groundwork for all future horror punk bands. After Misfits guitarist Bobby Steele departed from the band, he formed New York horror punk band the Undead. Steve Zing who was a part of the band's local Lodi, New Jersey following was one of the earliest musicians influenced by the Misfits. Zing formed his own horror punk Mourning Noise in 1981. Following the 1983 breakup of the Misfits, vocalist Glenn Danzig formed Samhain, a similarly horror-themed punk band. The band released only two albums during their time as a band, with a third recorded at the time being released posthumously in 1990. By this time the band's members were instead pursuing the heavy metal band Danzig.

In the early 1980s the death rock genre was pioneered in Los Angeles by groups like 45 Grave, Christian Death, Super Heroines and Kommunity FK. Although death rock and horror punk are separate styles of punk, they bear a significant overlap through emphasis on horror themes and imagery. Death rock band 45 Grave, in particular, are massively influential on horror punk.

=== Subsequent developments (1990s–present) ===
The Misfits reformed in 1995, this time featuring Michale Graves on vocals, releasing two albums before his 1998 departure. Although a period of the band often demeaned by its fanbase, the Graves era of the Misfits played a significant role in increasing the notoriety of the band and horror punk in general. Prior to the reunion, they were a band influential amongst the punk and metal scenes however were obscure outside of that circle. It was only during the 1990s that "the majority of rock fans woke up to them".

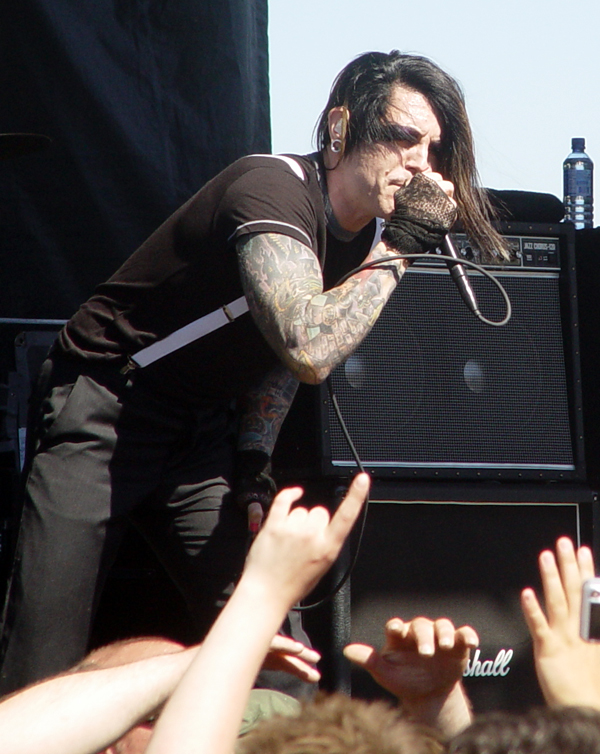
Davey Havok, vocalist for AFI and Son of Sam

A new wave of horror punk emerged in the late 1990s and early 2000s. AFI, who had previously been established as hardcore band, transitioned into a horror punk sound following their 1998 recruitment of guitarist Jade Puget. A 2022 article published by Metal Hammer credited their 1999 album Black Sails in the Sunset as having "reinvented the horror punk of the Misfits for a new generation". In 2000, AFI vocalist Davey Havok formed Son of Sam alongside the 1999 reunion lineup of Samhain. This lineup released one album Songs from the Earth in 2001. Another key figure from this period was Wednesday 13, who Metal Hammer writer Rich Hobson termed a "horror-punk hero". In 2002 he formed the Murderdolls alongside Joey Jordison, which began writing by "cannibalising" the music of 13's prior band Frankenstein Drag Queens from Planet 13. Following the band's 2004 hiatus, he began a solo-career. At this same time, horror punk-influenced bands also gained notability, including My Chemical Romance, Alkaline Trio and Tiger Army.

During the 2000s, the distinction between psychobilly and horror punk became increasingly obscured. The Creepshow were one prominent band blurring these genre lines. During this same period, Blitzkid's merger of "goth's stretching shadow and pop-punk's teenage humanity" too gained notability alongside Calabrese.

Kerrang! writer Chris Krovatin credited Creeper as the band "keeping horror punk alive" in the late-2010s. Following the release of their debut album Eternity, in Your Arms (2017) the band changed their sound towards glam rock. However, after this shift the band's vocalist Will Gould began Salem, a band reviving Creeper's earlier sound. This led Punktastic writer Tom Walsh to describe Gould as "on a crusade to single handedly revive the horror punk genre".

== See also ==
- List of horror punk bands
- Hardcore punk
