= List of songs recorded by the Misfits =

This list of songs by the Misfits makes it easy to locate which album/single/ep a particular song has been released on. Many songs have been released multiple times due to the amount of compilation by the group. This list includes songs recorded by the Misfits, regardless of the writing credits.

== 0–9 ==
Song	Released on	Track length	Notes
1,000,000 Years B.C.	Famous Monsters (1999) Cuts from the Crypt (2001)		Released on UK pressings of Famous Monsters only.
20 Eyes	Walk Among Us (1982) Evilive (1982) Box Set (1996)	1:41 (Walk Among Us), 1:55 (Evilive)	Evilive Live Recording

=== A ===
Song	Released on	Track length	Notes
Abominable Dr. Phibes	American Psycho (1997); Evillive II (1998)		Evillive II version is live and was coupled with an intro, reading "Intro - Abominable Dr. Phibes".
All Hell Breaks Loose	Walk Among Us (1982); Evilive (1982); Box Set (1996)	1:47 (Walk Among Us), 1:33 (Evilive)	Evilive version is a live performance.
American Nightmare	Legacy of Brutality (1985); Box Set (1996); Evillive II (1998)		Evillive II version is live.
American Psycho	American Psycho (1997); Evillive II (1998)		Evillive II version is live.
Angel Baby	Psycho in the Wax Museum (2006)		
Angelfuck	Legacy of Brutality (1985); Box Set (1996); Static Age (1998)		
Astro Zombies	Walk Among Us (1982); Evilive (1982); Collection I Box Set (1996); 12 Hits from Hell (2001)		Evillive version is a live performance.
Attitude	Bullet; Beware; Collection II; Box Set (1996); Static Age (1998)		

=== B ===
Song	Released on	Track length	Notes
The Black Hole	The Devil's Rain (2011)		
Blacklight	American Psycho (1997); Cuts from the Crypt (2001)		Cuts From The Crypt version is a demo.
Bloodfeast	Earth A.D./Wolfs Blood; Collection II; Box Set (1996)		
Braineaters	Walk Among Us (1982); Collection II; Box Set (1996)		
Bruiser	Cuts from the Crypt (2001)		
Bullet	Bullet; Beware; Collection I Box Set (1996); Static Age (1998); Evillive II (1998)		Evillive II version is live.

=== C ===
Song	Released on	Track length	Notes
Children In Heat	Horror Business; Collection II; Box Set (1996)		
Cold in Hell	The Devil's Rain (2011)		
Come Back	Legacy of Brutality (1985); Box Set (1996); Static Age (1998)		
Cough/Cool	Cough/Cool; Collection II; Box Set (1996)		When the song was released on Collection and Box Set it retained the drum track of the original Misfits version, but Danzig overdubbed guitar and drum machine tracks and new vocals. The song originally had no guitar at all, and was recorded when the Misfits were a three-piece of keyboards, bass and drums.
Crawling Eye	Famous Monsters (1999)		
Crimson Ghost	American Psycho (1997)		
Curse of the Mummy's Hand	The Devil's Rain (2011)		

=== D ===
Song	Released on	Track length	Notes
Dark Shadows	The Devil's Rain (2011)		
Day of the Dead	American Psycho (1997); Evillive II (1998)		Evillive II version is live.
Day the Earth Caught Fire	Don't Open 'Til It's Doomsday		
Dead Kings Rise	American Psycho (1997); Cuts from the Crypt (2001)		Only released on vinyl version of American Psycho. Cuts from the Crypt version is a demo.
Death Comes Ripping	Earth A.D./Wolfs Blood; Collection I Box Set (1996)		
Death of the Fallen Angel	Psycho in the Wax Museum (2006)		
Death Ray	The Devil's Rain (2011)		
Demonomania	Earth A.D./Wolfs Blood; Collection II; Box Set (1996)		
Descending Angel	Famous Monsters (1999)		
Devil Doll	Famous Monsters (1999); Cuts from the Crypt (2001)		Released on UK and Japanese versions of Famous Monsters only.
The Devil's Rain	The Devil's Rain (2011)		
Devil's Whorehouse	Walk Among Us (1982); Evilive (1982); Collection II; Box Set (1996)		Evilive version is a live performance.
Devilock	Earth A.D./Wolfs Blood; Collection I Box Set (1996)		
Diana	Project 1950 (2003)		
Die, Die My Darling	Earth A.D./Wolfs Blood; Die, Die My Darling; Collection I Box Set (1996); Evillive II (1998)		Evillive II version is live.
Die Monster Die	Famous Monsters (1999)		
Dig Up Her Bones	Dig Up Her Bones (1997); American Psycho (1997); Evillive II (1998)		Evillive II version is live.
Don't Open 'Til Doomsday	American Psycho (1997); Evillive II (1998)		Evillive II version is live.
Donna	Project 1950 (2003)		
Dr. Phibes Rises Again	Cuts from the Crypt (2001)		
Dream Lover	Project 1950 (2003)		
Dust to Dust	Famous Monsters (1999)		

=== E ===
Song	Released on	Track length	Notes
Earth A.D.	Earth A.D./Wolfs Blood; Collection I Box Set (1996)		

=== F ===
Song	Released on	Track length	Notes
Father	The Devil's Rain (2011)		
Fiend Club	Famous Monsters (1999)		
Fiend Without a Face	Cuts from the Crypt (2001)		
The Forbidden Zone	Famous Monsters (1999)		
From Hell They Came	American Psycho (1997); Evilive II (1998)		Evilive II version is live.

=== G ===
Song	Released on	Track length	Notes
Ghost of Frankenstein	The Devil's Rain (2011)		
Ghouls Night Out	3 Hits from Hell; Evilive (1982); Collection I Box Set (1996); 12 Hits from Hell (2001)		Evilive version is a live performance.
Great Balls of Fire	Project 1950 (2003)		
Green Hell	Earth A.D./Wolfs Blood; Collection I Box Set (1996)		

=== H ===
Song	Released on	Track length	Notes
Halloween	Halloween; Legacy of Brutality (1985); Collection II; Box Set (1996); 12 Hits from Hell (2001)		
Halloween II	Halloween; Collection II; Box Set (1996); 12 Hits from Hell (2001)		
Hate Breeders	Walk Among Us (1982); Evilive (1982); Collection II; Box Set (1996)		Evilive version is a live performance.
Hate the Living, Love the Dead	American Psycho (1997); Evillive II (1998)		Evillive II version is live.
The Haunting	American Psycho (1997); Evillive II (1998); Cuts from the Crypt (2001)		Evillive II version is live. Cuts from the Crypt version is a demo.
Helena	Famous Monsters (1999)		
Helena 2	Famous Monsters (1999); Cuts from the Crypt (2001)		Released on UK pressings of Famous Monsters only.
Hell Night	American Psycho (1997)		Hidden track.
Hellhound	Earth A.D./Wolfs Blood; Collection II; Box Set (1996)		
Hollywood Babylon	Bullet; Beware; Collection I Box Set (1996); Static Age (1998)		
Horror Business	Horror Business; Beware; Evilive (1982); Collection I Box Set (1996)		Evilive version is a live performance.
Horror Hotel	3 Hits from Hell; Evilive (1982); Collection II; Box Set (1996); 12 Hits from Hell (2001)		Evilive version is a live performance.
The Hunger	American Psycho (1997); Evillive II (1998); Cuts from the Crypt (2001)		Evillive II version is live. Cuts from the Crypt version is a demo.
Hunting Humans	Famous Monsters (1999)		
Hybrid Moments	Legacy of Brutality (1985); Box Set (1996); Static Age (1998)		

=== I ===
Song	Released on	Track length	Notes
I Got a Right	Cuts from the Crypt (2001)		
I Turned into a Martian	Walk Among Us (1982); Collection I Box Set (1996); 12 Hits from Hell (2001)	1:41 (Walk Among Us)	
I Wanna Be a NY Ranger	I Wanna Be a NY Ranger (1998); Cuts from the Crypt (2001); Short Music For Short People		
In the Doorway	Static Age (1998)		

=== J ===
Song	Released on	Track length	Notes
Jack the Ripper	The Devil's Rain (2011)		

=== K ===
Song	Released on	Track length	Notes
Kong at the Gates	Famous Monsters (1999)	1:22	
Kong Unleashed	Famous Monsters (1999)	0:47	

=== L ===
Song	Released on	Track length	Notes
Land of the Dead	Land of the Dead (2009); The Devil's Rain (2011)		
Last Caress	Beware; Collection II; Box Set (1996); Static Age (1998); Evillive II (1998)		Evillive II version is live.
Latest Flame	Project 1950 (2003)		
Living Hell	Famous Monsters (1999)		
London Dungeon	3 Hits from Hell; Evilive (1982); Collection I Box Set (1996); 12 Hits from Hell (2001)		Evilive version is a live performance. Two versions appear on 12 Hits from Hell.
Lost In Space	Famous Monsters (1999)		

=== M ===
Song	Released on	Track length	Notes
Mars Attacks	American Psycho (1997); Cuts from the Crypt (2001)		Cuts from the Crypt version is a demo.
Mephisto Waltz	Collection II; Box Set (1996)		
Mommy Can I Go Out & Kill Tonight?	Walk Among Us (1982); Earth A.D./Wolfs Blood; Die, Die My Darling; Collection I Box Set (1996)		Walk Among Us version is live.
Monkey's Paw	The Devil's Rain (2011)		
Monster Mash	Cuts from the Crypt (2001); Project 1950 (2003)		Cuts from the Crypt and Project 1950 versions are different recordings.

=== N ===
Song	Released on	Track length	Notes
Night of the Living Dead	Night of the Living Dead; Walk Among Us (1982); Evilive (1982); Collection I Box Set (1996); 12 Hits from Hell (2001)		Evilive version is a live performance.
Nike A Go Go	Walk Among Us (1982); Evilive; Collection II; Box Set (1996)		Evilive version is a live performance.
No More Moments	Cuts from the Crypt (2001)		

=== O ===
Song	Released on	Track length	Notes
Only Make Believe	Project 1950 (2003)		

=== P ===
Song	Released on	Track length	Notes
Pumpkin Head	Famous Monsters (1999)		

=== Q ===
Song	Released on	Track length	Notes
Queen Wasp	Earth A.D./Wolfs Blood; Collection II; Box Set (1996)		

=== R ===
Song	Released on	Track length	Notes
Rat Fink	Night of the Living Dead; Collection II; Box Set (1996)		
Resurrection	American Psycho (1997)		
Return of the Fly	Collection II; Box Set (1996); Static Age (1998)		
Rise Above	Cuts from the Crypt (2001)		Live performance.
Runaway	Project 1950 (2003)		

=== S ===
Song	Released on	Track length	Notes
Saturday Night	Famous Monsters (1999)		
Scarecrow Man	Famous Monsters (1999)		
Scream!	Scream! (1999); Famous Monsters (1999); Cuts from the Crypt (2001)		Famous Monsters version and demo version appear on the single. Cuts from the Crypt version is a demo.
She	Cough/Cool; Legacy of Brutality (1985); Collection I Box Set (1996); Static Age (1998)		Appears three times on Box Set, disc 1, 2 and 3.
Shining	American Psycho (1997); Evillive II (1998)		Evillive II version is live.
Skulls	Walk Among Us (1982); Collection I Box Set (1996); 12 Hits from Hell (2001)		
Sleepwalkin'	The Devil's Rain (2011)		
Some Kinda Hate	Legacy of Brutality (1985); Box Set (1996); Static Age (1998)		
Speak of the Devil	American Psycho (1997); Evillive II (1998)		Evillive II version is live.
Spinal Remains	Legacy of Brutality (1985); Box Set (1996); Static Age (1998)		
Spook City U.S.A.	Box Set (1996)		
Static Age	Teenagers from Mars; Legacy of Brutality (1985); Box Set (1996); Static Age (1998)		Appears twice on Box Set, on disc 2 and 4.
Static Intro	Box Set (1996)	0:06	
Static Outro	Box Set (1996)	0:08	

=== T ===
Song	Released on	Track length	Notes
Teenagers from Mars	Horror Business; Beware; Collection I Box Set (1996); Static Age (1998)		
Them	Famous Monsters (1999)		
Theme for a Jackal	Legacy of Brutality (1985); Box Set (1996); Static Age (1998)		
This Island Earth	American Psycho (1997); Evillive II (1998)		Evillive II version is live.
This Magic Moment	Project 1950 (2003)		
TV Casualty	Legacy of Brutality (1985); Box Set (1996); Static Age (1998)		
Twilight of the Dead	Land of the Dead (2009); The Devil's Rain (2011)		

=== U ===
Song	Released on	Track length	Notes
Unexplained	The Devil's Rain (2011)		

=== V ===
Song	Released on	Track length	Notes
Vampira	Walk Among Us (1982); Collection I Box Set (1996); Evillive II (1998); 12 Hits from Hell (2001)	1:26 (Walk Among Us), 1:25 (Evillive II)	Evillive II version is live.
Violent World	Walk Among Us (1982); Box Set (1996); 12 Hits from Hell (2001)		
Vivid Red	The Devil's Rain (2011)		
Vampire Girl	Vampire Girl (2015)		

=== W ===
Song	Released on	Track length	Notes
Walk Among Us	American Psycho (1997); Evilive II (1998)		Evilive II version is live.
We Are 138	Bullet; Beware; Evilive (1982); Collection II; Box Set (1996); Static Age (1998)		Evilive version is a live performance.
We Bite	Earth A.D./Wolfs Blood; Die, Die My Darling; Collection II; Box Set (1996)		
Where Do They Go?	The Devil's Rain (2011)		
Where Eagles Dare	Night of the Living Dead; Legacy of Brutality (1985); Collection I Box Set (1996); Evillive II (1998); 12 Hits from Hell (2001)		Appears twice on Box Set, disc 1 and 2. Evillive II version is live.
Witch Hunt	Famous Monsters (1999)		
Who Killed Marilyn?	Legacy of Brutality (1985); Box Set (1996)		Originally released as a Glenn Danzig solo single.
Wolfs Blood	Earth A.D./Wolfs Blood; Collection I Box Set (1996)		

=== X ===
Song	Released on	Track length	Notes

=== Y ===
Song	Released on	Track length	Notes
You Belong to Me	Project 1950 (2003)		

=== Z ===
Song	Released on	Track length	Notes
