= List of Misfits band members =

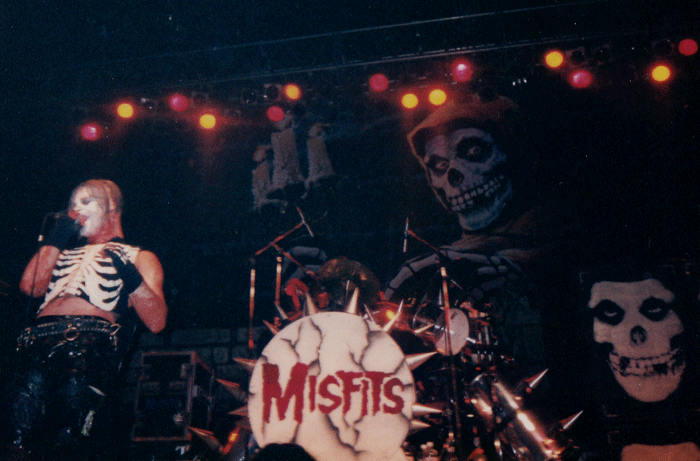
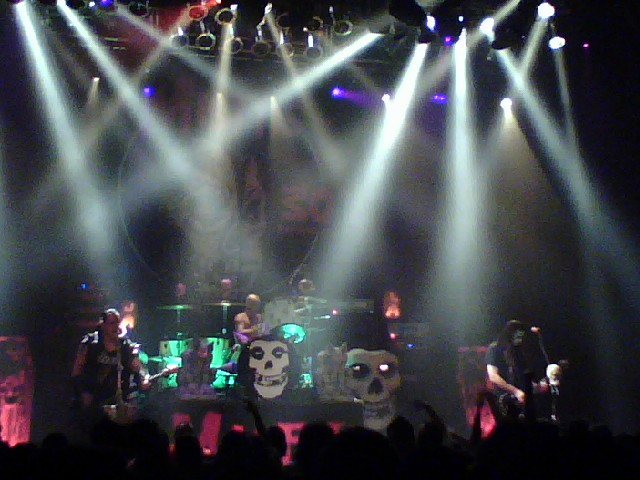
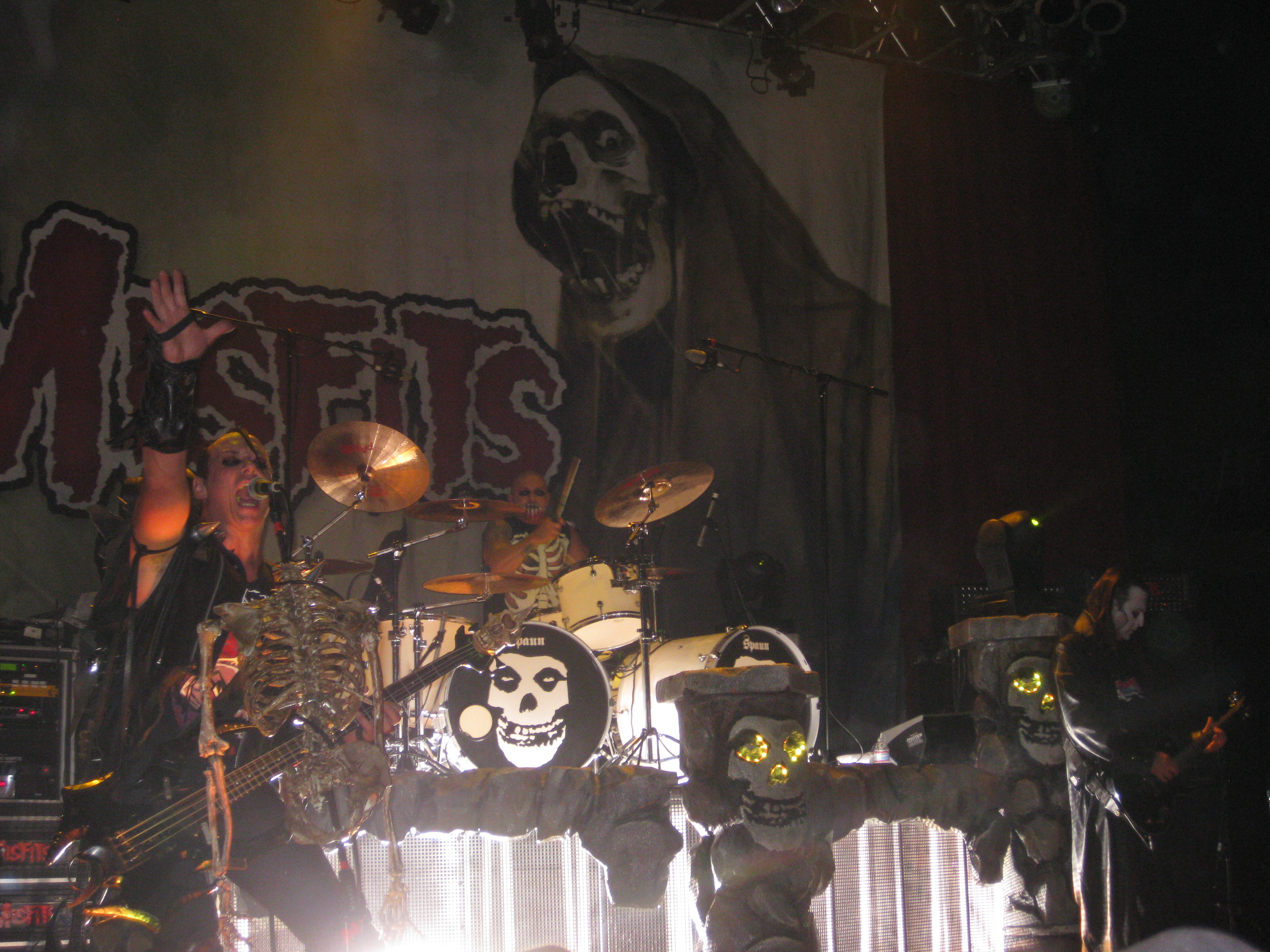
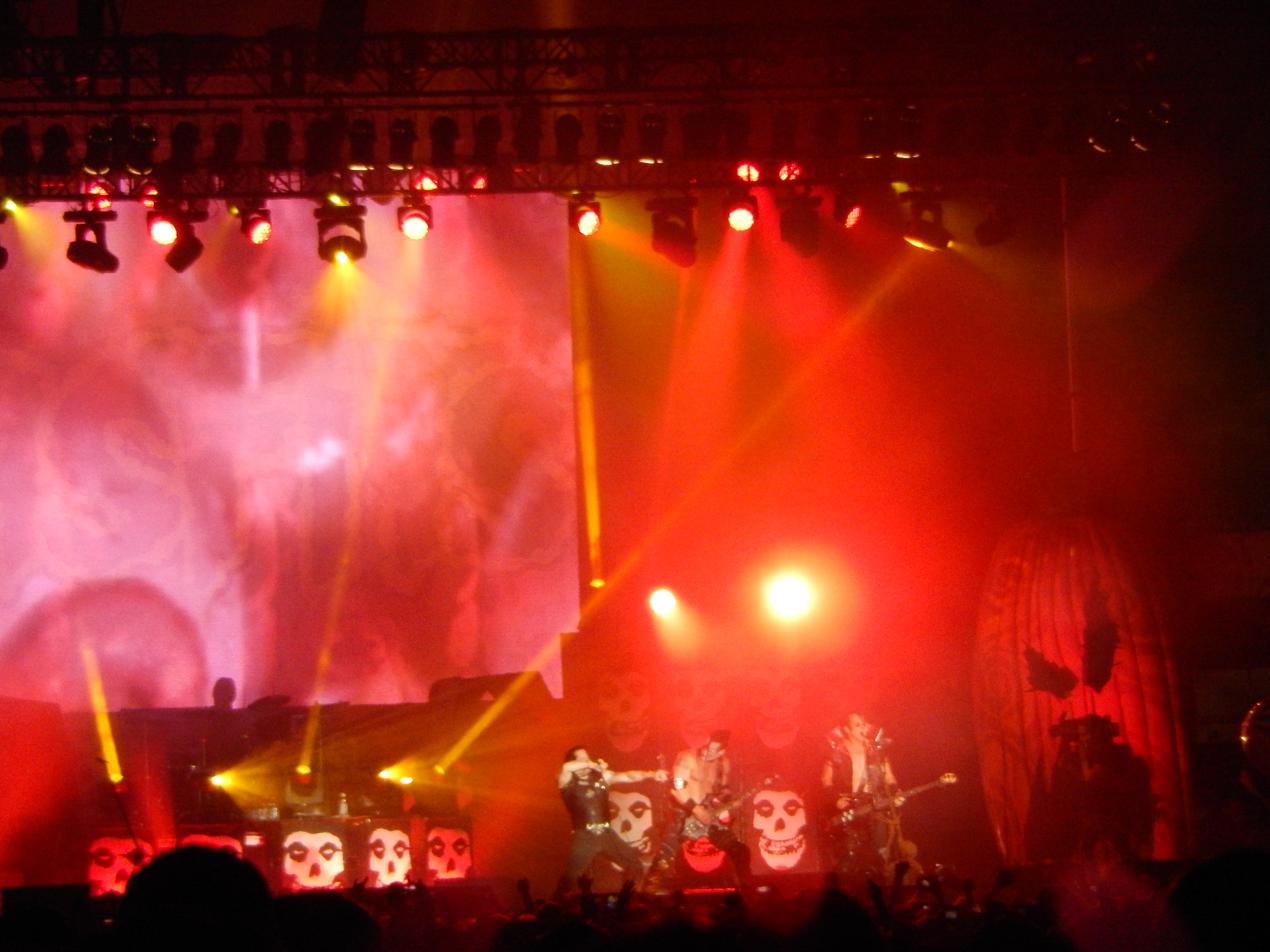
Lineups of Misfits performing in 1998, 2008, 2012 and 2016.

Misfits are an American horror punk band from Lodi, New Jersey. Formed in February 1977, the group originally included vocalist and keyboardist Glenn Danzig, bassist Diane DiPiazza, who was replaced by Jerry Only, and drummer Mr. Jim, who was replaced by Manny Martinez shortly after, with guitarist Franché Coma added in the fall of that year. The band went through a number of personnel changes, including adding Only's brother Doyle Wolfgang von Frankenstein on guitars in 1980, before breaking up in 1983. Only and Doyle reformed the Misfits in 1995 with new vocalist Michale Graves and drummer Dr. Chud. Doyle and Danzig rejoined the band in 2016, alongside guitarist Acey Slade and drummer Dave Lombardo.

== History ==
=== 1977–1983 ===
The Misfits were formed in 1977 in Lodi, New Jersey, by Glenn Danzig. Danzig's first recruit to the Misfits was drummer Mr. Jim and bassist Diane DiPiazza, however, DiPiazza never showed up. Mr. Jim was replaced by Manny Martinez shortly after. The two practiced in Martínez's garage, with Danzig on electric piano and Martínez on drums. The duo soon encountered Jerry Caiafa, who was dating a neighbor of Martínez's and had just received a bass guitar for Christmas. After performing as a three-piece for a number of months, which spawned their first single "Cough/Cool", the band added guitarist Frank "Franché Coma" Licata in October. By the end of the year they had also replaced Martínez with James "Mr. Jim" Catania. Misfits recorded its debut album Static Age in the first two months of 1978, but it remained unreleased until 1996. "Bullet" was issued in June 1978.

Coma left midway through a North American tour in October 1978, followed by Mr. Jim later in the month. They were replaced in November by Bobby "Steele" Kaufhold and Joey "Image" Poole, respectively. Coma was initially replaced by Rick Riley for two shows before Steele joined. After the release of two singles – "Horror Business" and "Night of the Living Dead" – Image left Misfits in December 1979 following conflicts with Danzig and Only. The group went on a short hiatus, before adding drummer Arthur Googy (real name Arthur McGuckin) in April 1980. Later in the year, Steele was replaced by Only's 16-year-old brother Paul Caiafa (originally a roadie for the band), who adopted the moniker Doyle. This lineup recorded the band's first album to be released, Walk Among Us, which was issued in March 1982. Googy left shortly after its release following an argument with Danzig.

Returning with former Black Flag drummer Roberto "Robo" Valverde, Misfits recorded its second album Earth AD/Wolfs Blood throughout late 1982 and early 1983. Robo left in August 1983, with Brian Damage (real name Brian Keats) brought in for scheduled tour dates later in the year. However, Danzig disbanded the group after a final show on October 29 which Rolling Stone writer Kory Grow described as "shambolic", during which former touring drummer Todd Swalla was forced to substitute for the drunken Damage. Earth AD/Wolfs Blood was released in December 1983, followed by single "Die, Die My Darling" in May 1984. Following the breakup of the Misfits, Danzig formed Samhain and later Danzig, while the Caiafa brothers formed Kryst the Conqueror.

=== 1995 onwards ===
After a legal case regarding ownership of the band's name, Only "secured the exclusive legal right to tour and record as the Misfits" in 1995 and reformed the band with Doyle. The pair initially invited Danzig to rejoin, who declined. During auditions for new bandmates, Only and Doyle recorded several demos with vocalist Eric Weiss and drummer Joel Gausten, although they were not official members of the band. Later in the year, vocalist Michael "Michale Graves Emanuel and drummer David "Dr. Chud" Calabrese joined the group, with their first shows coming in October. The new lineup released several recordings together, including American Psycho and Famous Monsters. Graves briefly departed in 1998, during which time Myke Hideous filled in on several tour dates.

Graves and Chud left midway through a show on October 25, 2000. Several guest musicians replaced them at later dates, including former member Joey Image, vocalist Zoli Téglás and drummer Ken "Renfield" Schalk. In early 2001, the group toured with a range of guests, including Eric Arce, former members Robo and Graves, former Black Flag guitarist Dez Cadena, and former Ramones drummer Marky Ramone. Both Cadena and Marky later became official members, before Doyle left the band in May 2001. Robo returned to replace Ramone in May 2005, remaining until November 2010 when he was replaced by Arce. In 2014, the band expanded to a four-piece with the addition of Only's son Jerry Caiafa II on guitar, although the following June it was announced that Cadena had to cease performing due to undergoing cancer treatment.

On May 12, 2016, it was announced that Danzig would be returning to the band for the first time since 1983, alongside guitarist Doyle, for a lineup dubbed "The original Misfits". In August, it was announced that former Slayer drummer Dave Lombardo would be joining as the fourth member of the group, with the first reunion shows taking place the following month.

== Members ==
=== Current ===
Image	Name (real name)	Years active	Instruments	Release contributions
	Jerry Only (Jerry Caiafa)	1977–1983; 1995–present	bass; backing vocals; lead vocals (2000–2016)	all Misfits releases
	Glenn Danzig (Glenn Anzalone)	1977–1983; 2016–present	lead vocals; keyboards (early 1977); drums; guitar	all Misfits releases from "Cough/Cool" (1977) to Collection II (1995)
	Doyle Wolfgang von Frankenstein (Paul Caiafa)	1980–1983; 1995–2001; 2016–present	lead guitar	all Misfits releases from 3 Hits from Hell (1981) to "Monster Mash" (1999); Psycho in the Wax Museum (2006)
	Acey Slade (Emil Schmidt)	2016–present	rhythm guitar; backing vocals	none as of yet
	Dave Lombardo	2016–present	drums	none as of yet

=== Former ===
Image	Name (real name)	Years active	Instruments	Release contributions
	Manny Martínez	1977 (died 2023)	drums; percussion	"Cough/Cool" (1977)
	Jimi Battle	1977	guitars	none
	Diane DiPiazza	1977	bass	none
	Mr. Jim (Jim Catania)	1977; 1978 (touring 2007)	drums	"Bullet" (1978); "Last Caress" (1980); Static Age (1996)
	Franché Coma (Frank Licata)	1977–1978 (touring 2007)	guitars; backing vocals	"Bullet" (1978); "Last Caress" (1980); Static Age (1996)
	Bobby Steele (Bobby Kaufhold)	1978–1980	guitars; backing vocals	"Horror Business" (1979); "Night of the Living Dead" (1979)
	Joey Image (Joey Poole)	1978–1979 (touring 2000) (died 2020)	drums	"Horror Business" (1979); "Night of the Living Dead" (1979)
	Arthur Googy (Arthur McGuckin)	1980–1982	drums	all Misfits releases from 3 Hits from Hell (1981) to Evilive (1982)
	Robo (Roberto Valverde)	1982–1983; 2005–2010 (touring 2001–02)	drums	Earth A.D./Wolfs Blood (1983); "Die, Die My Darling" B-sides (1984); "Land of the Dead" (2009)
	Dr. Chud (David Calabrese)	1995–2000	drums; keyboards	all Misfits releases from American Psycho (1997) to "Monster Mash" (1999); Psycho in the Wax Museum (2006)
	Michale Graves (Michael Emanuel)	1995–1998; 1998–2000 (touring 2000–2001)	lead vocals	all Misfits releases from American Psycho (1997) to "Monster Mash" (1999), except "I Wanna Be a NY Ranger" (1998)
	Dez Cadena	2001–2015	lead guitar; backing and lead vocals	all Misfits releases from "Day the Earth Caught Fire" (2002) to "Horror Xmas" (2013), except Psycho in the Wax Museum (2006)
	Marky Ramone (Marky Bell)	2001–2005	drums; percussion	"Day the Earth Caught Fire" (2002); Project 1950 (2003)
	Chupacabra (Eric Arce)	2010–2016 (touring 2000–01)	drums	all Misfits releases from The Devil's Rain (2011) to Friday the 13th (2016)
	Jerry Other (Jerry Caiafa II)	2014–2016	rhythm guitar	Vampire Girl/Zombie Girl (2015); Friday the 13th (2016)
	Marc Rizzo	2015	lead guitar	Vampire Girl/Zombie Girl (2015)

=== Touring ===
Image	Name (real name)	Years active	Instruments	Notes
	Rick Riley	1978	guitars	After the sudden departure of Franché Coma, Riley played guitar for the band at two shows in October 1978.
	Todd Swalla	1982; 1983	drums	Swalla played one Misfits show in June 1982, and later substituted for Damage on October 29, 1983.
	Brian Damage (Brian Keats)	1983 (died 2010)	drums	His first and only performance turned out to be the band's farewell show. He played thirteen songs of the set and was then replaced for the rest of the show by Swalla.
	Myke Hideous (Myke Itzazone)	1998	lead vocals	Hideous temporarily replaced Michale Graves during the summer of 1998, before the regular vocalist returned.
	Zoli Téglás	2000	lead vocals	Following the departure of Michale Graves in October 2000, Téglás temporarily fronted the band at live shows.
	Renfield (Ken Schalk)	2000	drums	After Dr. Chud left in October 2000, he was temporarily replaced by Arce, Renfield and Cross.
	Matt Cross	2000	drums	After Dr. Chud left in October 2000, he was temporarily replaced by Arce, Renfield and Cross.

== Lineups ==
Period	Members	Releases
January – February 1977	Glenn Danzig – vocals; Jimi Battle – guitars; Diane DiPiazza – bass; Mr. Jim – drums	none
March – October 1977	Glenn Danzig – lead vocals, keyboards; Jerry Only – bass, backing vocals; Manny Martínez – drums	"Cough/Cool" (1977)
October – December 1977	Glenn Danzig – lead vocals; Franché Coma – guitars, backing vocals; Jerry Only – bass, backing vocals; Manny Martínez – drums	none
January – October 1978	Glenn Danzig – lead vocals; Jerry Only – bass, backing vocals; Franché Coma – guitars, backing vocals; Mr. Jim – drums	"Bullet" (1978); "Last Caress" (1980); Static Age (1996)
October 1978	Glenn Danzig – lead vocals; Rick Riley – guitars (temporary); Jerry Only – bass, backing vocals; Mr. Jim – drums	none
November 1978 – December 1979	Glenn Danzig – lead vocals; Bobby Steele – guitars, backing vocals; Jerry Only – bass, backing vocals; Joey Image – drums	"Horror Business" (1979); "Night of the Living Dead" (1979); Beware (1980)
April – October 1980	Glenn Danzig – lead vocals; Bobby Steele – guitars, backing vocals; Jerry Only – bass, backing vocals; Arthur Googy – drums	"London Dungeon" (1981); "Halloween II" (1981)
October 1980 – April 1982	Glenn Danzig – lead vocals; Doyle – guitars, backing vocals; Jerry Only – bass, backing vocals; Arthur Googy – drums	3 Hits from Hell (1981); "Halloween" (1981); Walk Among Us (1982); Evilive (1982); "Die, Die My Darling" (1984)
June 1982	Glenn Danzig – lead vocals; Jerry Only – bass, backing vocals; Doyle – guitars; Todd Swalla – drums (temporary)	none
July 1982 – August 1983	Glenn Danzig – lead vocals; Doyle – guitars; Jerry Only – bass, backing vocals; Robo – drums	Earth A.D./Wolfs Blood (1983); "Die, Die My Darling" B-sides (1984)
October 1983	Glenn Danzig – lead vocals; Doyle – guitars; Jerry Only – bass, backing vocals; Brian Damage – drums (temporary)	none
October 1983	Glenn Danzig – lead vocals; Doyle – guitars; Jerry Only – bass, backing vocals; Todd Swalla – drums (temporary)	none
Band inactive October 1983 – October 1995
October 1995 – May 1998	Michale Graves – lead vocals; Doyle – guitars; Jerry Only – bass, backing vocals; Dr. Chud – drums, keyboards	American Psycho (1997); Evillive II (1998); "Monster Mash" (1999); Psycho in the Wax Museum (2006) (does not feature Graves)
May – August 1998	Myke Hideous – lead vocals (temporary); Doyle – guitars; Jerry Only – bass, backing vocals; Dr. Chud – drums, keyboards	"I Wanna Be a NY Ranger" (1998) (does not feature Hideous)
August 1998 – October 2000	Michale Graves – lead vocals; Doyle – guitars; Jerry Only – bass, backing vocals; Dr. Chud – drums, keyboards	Famous Monsters (1999)
Band performed with guest musicians October 2000 – May 2001
May 2001 – May 2005	Jerry Only – lead vocals, bass; Dez Cadena – guitars, backing vocals; Marky Ramone – drums	"Day the Earth Caught Fire" (2002); Project 1950 (2003)
May 2005 – November 2010	Jerry Only – lead vocals, bass; Dez Cadena – guitars, backing vocals; Robo – drums	"Land of the Dead" (2009)
November 2010 – late 2014	Jerry Only – lead vocals, bass; Dez Cadena – guitars, vocals; Chupacabra – drums	The Devil's Rain (2011); Dead Alive! (2013); "Descending Angel" (2013); Horror Xmas (2014)
Late 2014 – June 2015	Jerry Only – lead vocals, bass; Dez Cadena – lead guitar, vocals; Jerry Other – rhythm guitar; Chupacabra – drums	none
June 2015 – May 2016	Jerry Only – lead vocals, bass; Jerry Other – guitars; Chupacabra – drums	"Vampire Girl/Zombie Girl" (2015); Friday the 13th (2016)
May 2016 – present	Glenn Danzig – lead vocals; Doyle – lead guitar; Acey Slade – rhythm guitar, backing vocals; Jerry Only – bass, backing vocals; Dave Lombardo – drums	none

== Bibliography ==
- Greene, James Jr. (February 14, 2013), This Music Leaves Stains (The Complete Story of the Misfits), Lanham, Maryland: Scarecrow Press, ISBN 978-1-58979-892-2
