= Misfits discography =

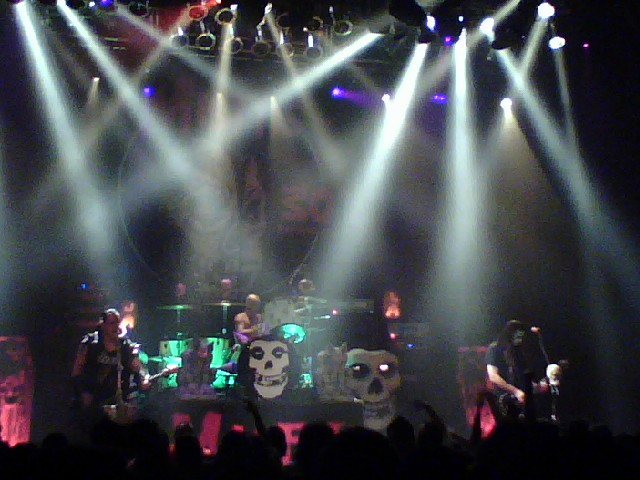
- The Misfits performing in San Diego, November 2008. Left to right: Jerry Only, Robo, and Dez Cadena.
- Studio albums: 7
- Extended plays: 6
- Live albums: 3
- Compilation albums: 4
- Singles: 19
- Video albums: 1
- Music videos: 5
- Box sets: 1
- Demos: 1
- Cancelled albums: 1
- Other appearances: 2

The discography of Misfits, a horror punk band formed in Lodi, New Jersey, in 1977, consists of seven studio albums, three live albums, four compilation albums, four EPs, nineteen singles, one video album, five music videos, one box set, one demo, and one cancelled album.

The Misfits were formed in 1977 by singer and songwriter Glenn Danzig. The band experienced many lineup changes during their first six years, with Danzig and bassist Jerry Only being the only constant fixtures. They released their first single, "Cough/Cool", in 1977 on Danzig's own label Blank Records. Mercury Records offered Danzig thirty hours of free studio time in exchange for the trademark to the Blank Records name, which the band used to record their first album, Static Age, in January 1978. However, they were unable to find a record label willing to release it and instead released four of the songs as the "Bullet" single on Danzig's new imprint Plan 9 Records. Static Age would not be released in its entirety for another eighteen years. The band released two additional singles in 1979: "Horror Business" and "Night of the Living Dead", both on Plan 9.

The band's first EP, Beware, was released in January 1980. That August they recorded twelve new songs intended for an album, but it was never released. Only's brother Doyle then became the band's guitarist and would remain so until 2000. Three of the songs from the album sessions were released as 3 Hits from Hell in April 1981, and two more were released as the "Halloween" single in October. Throughout 1981 the Misfits recorded songs for their first full-length album Walk Among Us, which was released in March 1982 through Ruby Records and Slash Records. A promotional music video was filmed for the song "Braineaters". That December they released a live EP titled Evilive. The band broke up due to internal tensions on October 29, 1983, just two months before their second album Earth A.D./Wolfs Blood was released through Plan 9. Following the band's breakup a posthumous single for "Die, Die My Darling" was released in 1984, followed by two compilation albums of out-of-print and previously unreleased material released through Caroline Records: Legacy of Brutality (1985) and Misfits (1986), which later became more commonly referred to as Collection I. Evilive was also re-released in 1987 as a full album.

After a series of legal battles ending in 1995, Jerry Only and Doyle re-formed the band with a new lineup including singer Michale Graves and drummer Dr. Chud. Caroline Records released Collection II that year, followed in 1996 by a box set titled simply The Misfits collecting nearly all of the band's early material, including Static Age which was released as a separate album in 1997. Also in 1997 the new Misfits lineup released American Psycho on Geffen Records, supported by music videos for "American Psycho" and the single "Dig Up Her Bones". Evillive II was released in 1998, followed by Famous Monsters in 1999 on Roadrunner Records with a single and music video for "Scream!" Graves, Chud, and Doyle all left the band in 2000, and a compilation of demos and b-sides from this era was released in 2001 as Cuts from the Crypt. Caroline Records attempted that year to release the material from the August 1980 sessions as 12 Hits from Hell, but the album was cancelled at the request of Danzig and Only before it could be released.

As the only remaining member of the Misfits, Jerry Only took over vocal duties and recruited Dez Cadena and Marky Ramone to fill out the band. This lineup released Project 1950 in 2003, an album of cover versions of rock and roll songs from the 1950s and 1960s, on their own label Misfits Records. Ramone was replaced by Robo in 2005, and this lineup released the "Land of the Dead" single in 2009. The Misfits lineup of Only, Cadena, and drummer Eric Arce released the band's seventh studio album, The Devil's Rain, in 2011. A live album, Dead Alive!, was released in February 2013.

== Studio albums ==
Year	Album details	Peak chart positions		
Year	Album details	US		
Year	Album details	Billboard 200	Heatseekers	Independent
1982	Walk Among Us: Released: March 1982; Label: Ruby/Slash (R2 79947); Format: LP, CS, CD	—	—	—
1983	Earth A.D./Wolfs Blood: Released: December 1983; Label: Plan 9; Format: LP, CS, CD	—	—	—
1997	American Psycho: Released: May 13, 1997; Label: Geffen (GEFD-25126); Format: LP, CS, CD	117	—	—
1997	Static Age^{[I]}: Recorded: January–February 1978; Released: July 15, 1997; Label: Caroline (CAROL 7520-2); Format: LP, CD	—	—	—
1999	Famous Monsters: Released: October 5, 1999; Label: Roadrunner (168 618 658-2); Format: LP, CD	138	—	—
2003	Project 1950: Released: July 29, 2003; Label: Misfits; Format: CD	133	2	5
2011	The Devil's Rain: Released: October 4, 2011; Label: Misfits; Format: CD	70	—	12
"—" denotes a release that did not chart.

I Static Age was recorded in 1978 but was not released in its entirety until 1996, as part of the Misfits box set. It was released as a stand-alone album in 1997.

== Live albums ==
Year	Album details
1987	Evilive^{[I]}: Released: October 1987; Label: Plan 9; Formats: CD, CS, LP
1998	Evillive II^{[II]}: Released: August 14, 1998; Label: Caroline; Formats: CD
2013	Dead Alive!: Released: February 5, 2013; Label: Misfits; Formats: CD, LP

I Evilive was first released as a 7-song EP in 1982. It was re-released as a 12-song album in 1987.

II Evillive II was released only to members of the Fiend Club.

== Compilation albums ==
Year	Album details
1985	Legacy of Brutality: Released: September 1985; Label: Caroline/Plan 9; Formats: LP, CS, CD
1986	Misfits^{[I]}: Released: July 1, 1986; Label: Caroline; Formats: LP, CS, CD
1995	Collection II: Released: November 14, 1995; Label: Caroline; Formats: LP, CS, CD
2001	Cuts from the Crypt: Released: October 30, 2001; Label: Roadrunner (168 618 467-2); Formats: CD

I Misfits is commonly referred to as Collection I.

== Box sets ==
Year	Details	Certifications (sales thresholds)
1996	The Misfits: Released: February 27, 1996; Label: Caroline (CAR 7529-2); Format: 4-CD box set	US: Gold

== EPs ==
Year	Album details
1980	Beware: Released: January 1980; Label: Armageddon/Spartan/Plan 9; Format: 12-inch EP
1981	3 Hits from Hell: Released: April 1981; Label: Plan 9; Formats: 7-inch EP
1982	Evilive^{[I]}: Released: December 1982; Label: Plan 9; Formats: 7-inch EP (released as a 12-inch EP in Germany prior to the expanded LP release)
2006	Psycho in the Wax Museum: Released: 2006; Label: Misfits; Format:
2013	Horror Xmas: Released: December 3, 2013; Label: Misfits; Formats: EP, CD, Digital
2016	Friday the 13th: Released: June 17, 2016; Label: Misfits; Formats: EP, CD, Digital

I Evilive was first released as a 7-song EP in 1982. It was re-released as a 12-song album in 1987.

== Singles ==
Year	Single	Certifications	Album
1977	"Cough/Cool"		—
1978	"Bullet"		Static Age
1979	"Horror Business"		—
1979	"Night of the Living Dead"		—
1981	"Halloween"		—
1984	"Die, Die My Darling"		Earth A.D./Wolfs Blood
1997	"Dig Up Her Bones"	RIAA: Gold	American Psycho
1998	"I Wanna Be a NY Ranger"		—
1999	"Scream!"		Famous Monsters
1999	"Monster Mash"		—
2002	"Day the Earth Caught Fire"		—
2003	"This Magic Moment"		Project 1950
2009	"Land of the Dead"		The Devil's Rain
2011	"Twilight of the Dead"		The Devil's Rain
2013	"Descending Angel"		—
2015	"Zombie Girl / Vampire Girl"		—
"—" denotes singles that were not album tracks.

=== Other certified songs ===
Year	Single	Certifications	Album
1980	"Last Caress"	RIAA: Gold	Beware
1996	"Hybrid Moments"	RIAA: Gold	Static Age

== Other appearances ==
The following Misfits tracks were released on compilation albums. Some songs were later re-released on Cuts from the Crypt, as noted below. This is not an exhaustive list: songs that were first released on the band's albums, EPs, or singles are not included.

Year	Release details	Tracks
1997	We Will Fall: The Iggy Pop Tribute: Released: 1997; Label: Royalty; Format: CD	"I Got a Right"^{[I]} (originally performed by Iggy Pop)
1999	Short Music for Short People: Released: June 1, 1999; Label: Fat Wreck Chords (FAT 591-2); Format: CD	"NY Ranger"
2018	Dr. Demento Covered in Punk: Released: January 12, 2018; Label: Demented Punk; Format: LP, CD	"The Cockroach That Ate Cincinnati" (originally performed by Rose & The Arrangement)

I Denotes songs that were re-released on Cuts from the Crypt.

== Video albums ==
Year	Video details
2003	Project 1950^{[I]}: Released: July 29, 2003; Label: Misfits (RCD 10643); Formats: DVD

I The DVD was packaged with the Project 1950 album.

== Music videos ==
Year	Title	Director	Album	Notes
1983	"Braineaters"		Walk Among Us	Wasn't submitted to any networks, just given to friends. Bootlegs exist. Videos can be found on YouTube
1997	"Dig Up Her Bones"	John Cafiero	American Psycho	
1998	"American Psycho"	John Cafiero	American Psycho	
1998	"Monster Mash" (live)	John Cafiero	"Monster Mash" 7-inch	Internet-only
1999	"Scream!"	George A. Romero and Richard Donner	Famous Monsters	Available on the Bruiser DVD and on the enhanced Cuts from the Crypt CD

== Demos ==
Year	Details
1997	Mars Attacks Demos^{[I]}: Released: 1997; Format: CD

I The Mars Attacks Demos were recorded for the American Psycho album and a proposed Mars Attacks EP that was never released. These tracks were re-released on Cuts from the Crypt.

== Cancelled albums ==
Year	Album details
2001	12 Hits from Hell^{[I]}: Label: Caroline; Formats: LP, CD

I 12 Hits from Hell was cancelled at the request of Glenn Danzig and Jerry Only. Only promotional copies were released, and all copies intended for distribution were destroyed.

== Tribute albums ==
- Violent World: A Tribute to the Misfits, released in 1997.
- Hell on Earth: A Tribute to the Misfits, released in 2000.
- Fiend Club Lounge, by The Nutley Brass, released in 2005.
