= Attitude (Misfits song) =

Song by the Misfits

from the album Static Age
- A-side: "Bullet"; "We Are 138"
- Released: June 1978
- Recorded: January–February 1978
- Venue: C.I., New York City
- Genre: Punk rock; horror punk
- Length: 1:32
- Label: Caroline
- Songwriter(s): Glenn Danzig
- Producer(s): Dave Achelis; Tom Bejgrowicz

Audio sample
- "Attitude": file; help

"Attitude" is a song by the American punk rock band Misfits. Written by frontman and vocalist Glenn Danzig, the song was recorded and first released in 1978 on the B-side of the band's single "Bullet". It was also included on the Misfits' 1980 EP Beware, as well as on the 1995 compilation album Collection II. "Attitude" was originally intended to be included on the band's proposed debut album Static Age, and it remained included when the album was eventually released in its entirety in 1996.

== Recording and release ==
"Attitude" was originally recorded by the Misfits in January–February 1978 for their proposed debut album Static Age, which would not be released in its entirety until 1996. The song was recorded in C.I. Studios in New York City. It was first released as part of the band's single "Bullet" in 1978, and would later be included on their 1980 EP Beware, which combined tracks from the previously released "Bullet" and "Horror Business" singles. It also appears on the 1995 compilation album Collection II. In 1996, Static Age was officially released for the first time, as part of the boxed set The Misfits. "Attitude" was included among the Static Age tracks in the boxed set, and it would also be included on the 1997 standalone release of Static Age.

== Critical reception ==
Eduardo Rivadavia of Ultimate Classic Rock ranked the song No. 1 on his list of the 10 best Misfits songs, calling it "astonishing". Dan Ozzi of Diffuser.fm ranked the song No. 8 on his list of the 10 best Misfits songs, writing that "Like most Misfits songs, 'Attitude' doesn't even top two minutes, and really, there's not much to it. Danzig's message is pretty simple: Keep acting like an a—hole, and I'm gonna knock you out."

Rob Kemp of Time Out has noted a reputation of "Attitude", among other Misfits songs, as being "antiestablishment" in nature. In his book This Music Leaves Stains: The Complete Story of the Misfits, author James Greene, Jr., in speaking of Guns N' Roses' cover of "Attitude" from their 1993 album "The Spaghetti Incident?", called "Attitude" a song that, "more than any other Danzig work, seemed to provide the blueprint for both GNR's adrenaline-heavy sound and Axl Rose's temperamental stage persona".

== Personnel ==
The Misfits

- Glenn Danzig – vocals
- Jerry Only – bass
- Franché Coma – guitar
- Mr. Jim – drums

Production

- Dave Achelis – engineer
- Tom Bejgrowicz – producer

== Cover versions ==
In 1993, Guns N' Roses covered "Attitude" for their album "The Spaghetti Incident?", with bassist Duff McKagan on vocals. "I couldn't say the Misfits were one of my all-around favourite bands," admitted GNR guitarist Slash. "But they did have a couple of great songs – like 'Attitude'."

The song has also been covered by the Crimson Ghosts, Endpoint, the Slackers, the Slow Break, Sum 41, and Winds of Plague. Additionally, the Nutley Brass recorded an instrumental lounge cover of the song, which was included on their 2005 Misfits tribute album Fiend Club Lounge. Dutch band Skroetbalg recorded a Dutch Low Saxon cover of the song, which was included on their 2021 demo.

== See also ==
- Misfits discography
