= Myke Hideous =

American singer

- Years active: 1987–present
- Website: mykehideous.com

Myke Hideous is an American gothic rock singer and songwriter from New Jersey.

He is the founder and frontman of the gothic rock band The Empire Hideous, which was active throughout the 1990s and into the early 2000s. He also performed with The Bronx Casket Co., Spy Society 99, and the Misfits as a fill-in vocalist on their South American and European tours that took place from May to July in 1998.

== Life and career ==
=== The early Empire Hideous years ===
Myke Hideous formed The Empire Hideous in 1988, for which he was the lead singer and songwriter. The group issued its first recording, a 12" EP titled The Empire Hideous in 1990. Although the band went through numerous personnel changes throughout the 1990s, they released two subsequent EPs, a live album (I'm Dead, You're Dead, We're All Dead, 1998) and a live studio recording (Victim Destroys Assailant, 1998). The band toured throughout the USA during the 1990s. Myke crafted an enigmatic and brooding stage persona and would become known among fans for his often shocking stage antics, including being whipped in between songs, donning a crown of thorns, eating live cockroaches, wearing a mask made of live giant killer wasps and inserting hypodermic needles into his flesh. Mark Steiner released a documentary film entitled To Build an Empire, about The Empire Hideous.

=== Performing with the Misfits ===
In 1998, he was hired as a fill-in vocalist for the Misfits when Michale Graves took an indefinite hiatus.

=== 2000s ===
After his Misfits experience, Myke Hideous briefly fronted his horror punk side project, Spy Society 99 and The Bronx Casket Co., with whom he recorded the albums The Bronx Casket Company (1999), Sweet Home Transylvania (2002), and Hellectric (2005), all credited as "Spy".

In 2003, Myke released a new studio album, Say Your Prayers. Myke felt inspired to resurrect The Empire Hideous shortly after 9/11.

In 2009, Myke announced he would be working on his final album and also began collaborating on the documentary Living the American Nightmare: The Story of a Rockstar. This documentary features Myke Hideous as the main subject, and is loosely based around his 2002 memoir. It includes footage of his early concerts, along with interviews from Myke and many musicians who had worked with him over the years.

At the beginning of 2011, Myke released his final album of new material, The Time Has Come. This record included the cover song "Moving in Stereo" by The Cars.

Within the next year, Myke also released his Spy Society 99 material for the first time on CD, Die Punk, Die, a 12 track album featuring nine songs only previously available on cassette and three new tracks and an album of remixes, Remixes Through Time. Some tracks from Remixes Through Time were included in the Living the American Nightmare: The Story of a Rockstar documentary.

In 2016, Myke Hideous re-released his autobiography titled King of an Empire to the Shoes of a Misfit: The Memoirs of Myke Hideous. It includes an added chapter, chronicling his professional and personal life from 2002-2013.

Myke Hideous considers himself officially retired from music, and focuses on his art and photography. He lives in rural Pennsylvania.

== Albums ==
The Empire Hideous

- This Evil On Earth, (EP), 1992.
- Only Time Will Tell, (Mini Album), 1994.
- Act IV: "It's Just A Matter Of Time", (EP), 1996.
- Victim Destroys Assailant, (CD, Album), 1998.
- I'm Dead, You're Dead, We're All Dead, (CD, Album), 1998.
- Say Your Prayers, (CD, Album, Digital), 2003.
- Body Of Work, (CD, Compilation), 2006.
- The Time Has Come, (CD, Album, Digital), 2011.
- Remixes Through Time, (CD, Album, Ltd, Dig), 2013.

Spy Society 99

- "Die, Punk Die", (CD, Ltd, Dig), 2013

Solo albums/ Misc Recordings

- Out of Anger, (cassette, out of print), 1994.
- "Pneuma" (unreleased)

Misfits (unofficial live releases)

- Psychos In Sweden, 1999.
- Beyond the Grave Live '98/'99, (4 CDs,) 2000.
- Psycho In Chile, (CD), [date unknown]

The Bronx Casket Co.

- "The Bronx Casket Co", 1999
- Sweet Home Transylvania, 2001
- Hellectric, 2005

== Live appearances ==
- THE PILGRIMAGE TOUR, (first traveling gothic rock festival in USA) 1993
- THE VAMPYRE’S BALL – NYC (I, III, IV & V)
- MEPHISTO CATHEDRA FESTIVALS – PA (I & II)
- DARK HARVEST FESTIVALS – PA (#II)
- NIGHT OF MISANTHROPY EVENTS – NYC (III & IV)
- Cable TV USA Network's “UP ALL NIGHT” – Halloween Special, w/RHONDA SHEER, 1996
- “TIME TOUR” (North East & Midwest USA *HIDEOUS tour, 2002)
- “A DARK WORLD ONLY GETS DARKER-TOUR” (East & West Coasts of USA, *HIDEOUS tour, 2003)
- “SAY YOUR PRAYERS-TOUR” (East & West Coasts of USA & Canada's East Coast *HIDEOUS tour 2004-2005)
- ATLANTIS MUSIC CONFERENCE – GA (2004)
- VAMPIRE BIZARR FESTIVAL – CA (2005)
- DRACULA’S BALL – PA (Dancing Ferret Production's event 2005)

== Publication ==
- Myke Hideous, King of an Empire to the Shoes of a Misfit. The Memoirs of Myke Hideous, biography

== Documentary (featured in) ==
- Mark Steiner (Director/Camera/Editor/Producer), To Build an Empire, documentary about The Empire Hideous, 1996.
- Paul Basile, Living the American Nightmare: the Story of a Rockstar, documentary about the career of Myke Hideous, 2011 (also featuring Peter Steele, Bobby Steele, Steve Zing, Franché Coma, Mr Jim, Argyle Goolsby).

== See also ==
- List of Misfits band members
- Voltaire's album Almost Human (2000) contains a track ("Alchemy Mondays") that refers to Myke Hideous.
