= Cough/Cool =

- The cover photograph shows the Misfits' initial recording lineup. Left to right: Manny Martinez, Glenn Danzig, and Jerry Caiafa.

Single by the Misfits
- A-side: "Cough/Cool"
- B-side: "She"
- Released: August 1977
- Recorded: June 1977
- Genre: Horror punk, post-punk
- Length: 3:36
- Label: Blank (Blank 101)
- Songwriter: Glenn Danzig

Misfits singles chronology
"Cough/Cool" (1977)	"Bullet" / "We Are 138" (1978)

"Cough/Cool" is the first single released by the horror punk band the Misfits. It was released in August 1977 on singer Glenn Danzig's label Blank Records. 500 copies were produced on black 7" vinyl. Both songs from the single were re-recorded and re-released in various versions over the following twenty years.

== Background ==
The Misfits had formed in February 1977 in Lodi, New Jersey, with a lineup including Danzig (who also played electric piano), bassist Jerry Only, and drummer Manny Martínez. the band was without a guitar player for six months. Danzig therefore used his electric piano to fill out the rhythm on the two songs "Cough/Cool" and "She", which were recorded in June 1977 at the Rainbow Studio and mastered at Spectrum Sound in Brooklyn, New York, by Rich Flores. By the time of the single's release in August 1977 the band had added First guitarist Franché Coma and Danzig phased out the piano in favor of singing exclusively.

Caiafa's surname was misspelled on the single's sleeve as "Caifa", leading him to insist that from then on he be credited as "Jerry, only Jerry". "Jerry Only" soon became his pseudonym, which he has continued to use throughout the rest of his career.

The subject of the song "She" is not mentioned in the lyrics, but Misfits associate Eerie Von noted in The Misfits box set in 1996 that the song was about Patty Hearst. The lyrics reference Hearst's participation in a San Francisco bank robbery in 1974: "She walked out with empty arms, machine gun in her hand/She is good and she is bad, no one understands/She walked in in silence, never spoke a word/She's got a rich daddy, she's her daddy's girl".

== Re-releases and other versions ==
"Cough/Cool" and "She" were re-recorded and re-released in several versions in subsequent years. "She" was re-recorded in January 1978, with guitar in place of the electric piano, for the Static Age album. The album was not released in its intended form for 20 years, though many of its songs saw release in various versions over the years. "She" had been one of three songs from the sessions that were never mixed, however, and so this version was not released until 1997, when Static Age was finally issued in its entirety. A third version of "She" was released in 1985 on the compilation album Legacy of Brutality, with overdubbed guitar and bass tracks by Danzig. This version was reissued on Misfits the following year. A new version of "Cough/Cool" appeared on Collection II in 1995; this version was recorded in 1987 by Danzig and former Misfits photographer Eerie Von . Danzig used the drum track from the original recording, but Danzig overdubbed guitar and drum machine tracks and new vocals. The original mixes of both "Cough/Cool" and "She", from the original single, were included in The Misfits box set (1996) along with the alternative versions from Legacy of Brutality and Collection II.

== Cover versions ==
"Cough/Cool" has been covered by English rock band The Wytches on their album Home Recordings, and by Washington DC rock band Adam West on their first fan club 7" single in 1993. Cover versions of "She" have appeared on two Misfits tribute albums, though these are based on later versions of the song that have guitar rather than electric piano. Snapcase covered the song for Violent World: A Tribute to the Misfits (1997), while the Demons covered it for Hell on Earth: A Tribute to the Misfits (2000). The Murder City Devils also covered the song for the compilation album Free the West Memphis 3 (2000) and the re-issue of their album In Name and Blood. Both tracks have been covered by California Hardcore band Twitching Tongues across their "Twitchfits" tribute releases, with "She" appearing on "Twitchfits Vol. 2" (2024), and "Cough/Cool" appearing on 2025's "Twitchfits Vol. 3", that the release art takes inspiration on the original release's cover. Breakcore artist Venetian Snares covered the song "She" on his 2002 album "Winter in the Belly of a Snake".

== Collector's value ==
Like other early Misfits recordings, original pressings of this single are highly collectible. In 2021, one copy of it sold for over $10,000.00.

== Track listing ==
All tracks are written by Glenn Danzig.

Side A
No.	Title	Length
1.	"Cough/Cool"	2:14

Side B
No.	Title	Length
1.	"She"	1:22
Total length:		3:36

== Personnel ==
=== Band ===
- Glenn Danzig – vocals, electric piano
- Jerry Caiafa – bass guitar
- Manny Martínez – drums

=== Production ===
- Rich Flores – mastering

== See also ==
- Misfits discography
