= The Misfits (album) =

Box set by the Misfits
- Released: February 27, 1996
- Recorded: 1977–1986
- Genres: Horror punk; hardcore punk; punk rock
- Length: 211:49
- Label: Caroline

Misfits chronology
Collection II (1995)	The Misfits (1996)	Static Age (1996)

Professional ratings
Review scores
Source	Rating
Allmusic	4.5/5 stars

The Misfits is a boxed set of material by the horror punk band the Misfits, released in 1996 by Caroline Records. Packaged in a coffin-shaped, velvet-lined box, the set includes four CDs covering most of the band's recorded material from the years when Glenn Danzig was their singer and songwriter. It also includes a "Fiend Club" pin and a booklet containing photographs, song lyrics, a discography, and a history of the band written by their photographer and associate Eerie Von. The exterior cover of the booklet was illustrated by artist Dave McKean.

The four CDs of the set include almost all of the material written and recorded by the Misfits between 1977 and 1983. The first disc includes tracks from the compilation albums Misfits (1986 - referred to in this set as Collection I) and Collection II (1995). The second disc includes another compilation, Legacy of Brutality (1985), as well as the albums Evilive (1987) and Earth A.D./Wolfs Blood (1983). The third disc is composed of tracks recorded during the band's studio sessions, some of which had previously released on the "Bullet" and "Night of the Living Dead" singles but most of which had never before been released. The fourth disc comprises the Static Age album, which had been recorded in 1978 but had never before been released in its entirety.

The album Walk Among Us (1982) was not included in the boxed set, as it was the only album to which Caroline Records did not hold distribution rights. Additionally the set omits three tracks from the Static Age sessions which had been recorded but were never mixed: "She", "Spinal Remains", and "In the Doorway". These tracks were mixed and included with Static Age when it was released as a separate album in 1997.

== History ==
Prior to the release of the boxed set most of the Misfits' material had been scattered amongst various albums, EPs, and singles, many of which had gone out of print. There were also numerous tracks that had been recorded during the band's active period from 1977 to 1983 but had never been released. The majority of their material had been issued by singer and songwriter Glenn Danzig's label Plan 9 Records. Danzig holds writing credits on all of the songs from these years, and held the rights to the material through the label. The one notable exception was the band's 1982 album Walk Among Us, which was released by the Slash Records subsidiary imprint Ruby Records. After the band's breakup in 1983 Danzig continued to issue Misfits material through Plan 9, including the studio album Earth A.D./Wolfs Blood (1983), which had been recorded prior to the breakup, the "Die, Die My Darling" single (1984), and the live album Evilive (1987). He also released the compilation album Legacy of Brutality in 1985, consisting of unreleased Misfits material on which he had overdubbed new guitar and bass tracks. Caroline Records also released the compilation album Misfits in 1986. Also in 1986 Slash Records was sold to London Records, who distributed their releases in the United States through Warner Bros. Records and elsewhere through Mercury Records. This meant that the distribution rights to Walk Among Us were now in the hands of London, Warner, and Mercury.

Throughout the late 1980s and early 1990s, brothers and former Misfits members Jerry Only and Doyle Wolfgang von Frankenstein were engaged in a number of legal battles with Glenn Danzig over writing credits on the Misfits' material, as well as the rights to the Misfits name and imagery. These culminated in an out-of-court settlement in 1995 which allowed Only and Doyle to once again record and perform as the Misfits, sharing merchandising rights with Danzig. As a condition of the settlement Plan 9 Records was dissolved and Caroline Records acquired the distribution rights to all of the Misfits' material with the exception of Walk Among Us, which was still held by London, Warner, and Mercury. Caroline promptly released Collection II, which Danzig had been compiling for several years. The Collection II title led the previous compilation, Misfits, to be more commonly referred to as Collection I. The boxed set was then released in 1996, collecting all of the material to which Caroline held distribution rights. To celebrate its release Generation Records in New York City held an in-store autograph signing with Jerry Only, Doyle, former Misfits members Franché Coma, Jim Catania, and Bobby Steele, and newly recruited Michale Graves and Dr. Chud who would be part of the new Misfits lineup.

== Track listing ==
All tracks are written by Glenn Danzig except where noted.

Disc 1: Collection I and Collection II
No.	Title	Source	Length
1.	"She"	Misfits (Collection I)	1:22
2.	"Hollywood Babylon"	Misfits (Collection I)	2:20
3.	"Horror Business"	Misfits (Collection I)	2:45
4.	"Teenagers from Mars"	Misfits (Collection I)	2:35
5.	"Night of the Living Dead"	Misfits (Collection I)	1:57
6.	"Where Eagles Dare"	Misfits (Collection I)	2:08
7.	"Vampira"	Misfits (Collection I)	1:21
8.	"I Turned into a Martian"	Misfits (Collection I)	1:44
9.	"Skulls"	Misfits (Collection I)	1:58
10.	"London Dungeon"	Misfits (Collection I)	2:34
11.	"Ghouls Night Out"	Misfits (Collection I)	1:58
12.	"Astro Zombies"	Misfits (Collection I)	2:11
13.	"Mommy, Can I Go Out and Kill Tonight"	Misfits (Collection I)	2:01
14.	"Die, Die My Darling"	Misfits (Collection I)	3:11
15.	"Cough/Cool"	Collection II	2:16
16.	"Children in Heat"	Collection II	2:07
17.	"Horror Hotel"	Collection II	1:27
18.	"Halloween"	Collection II	1:52
19.	"Halloween II"	Collection II	2:13
20.	"Hate Breeders"	Collection II	2:45
21.	"Braineaters"	Collection II	0:59
22.	"Nike-A-Go-Go"	Collection II	2:15
23.	"Devil's Whorehouse"	Collection II	1:48
24.	"Mephisto Waltz"	Collection II	1:45
25.	"Rat Fink" (Allan Sherman, Johnnie Lee Wills, Deacon Anderson)	Collection II	1:52
26.	"We Bite"	Collection II	1:15
Total length:			52:54

Disc 2: Legacy of Brutality, Evilive, and Earth A.D./Wolfs Blood
No.	Title	Source	Length
1.	"Static Age"	Legacy of Brutality	1:47
2.	"TV Casualty"	Legacy of Brutality	2:34
3.	"Hybrid Moments"	Legacy of Brutality	1:40
4.	"Spinal Remains"	Legacy of Brutality	1:24
5.	"Come Back"	Legacy of Brutality	5:01
6.	"Some Kinda Hate"	Legacy of Brutality	2:07
7.	"Theme for a Jackal"	Legacy of Brutality	2:38
8.	"Angelfuck"	Legacy of Brutality	1:36
9.	"Who Killed Marilyn?"	Legacy of Brutality	1:57
10.	"Where Eagles Dare"	Legacy of Brutality	1:59
11.	"She"	Legacy of Brutality	1:22
12.	"Halloween"	Legacy of Brutality	1:47
13.	"American Nightmare"	Legacy of Brutality	1:47
14.	"20 Eyes" (live)	Evilive	1:56
15.	"Night of the Living Dead" (live)	Evilive	1:42
16.	"Astro Zombies" (live)	Evilive	2:03
17.	"Horror Business" (live)	Evilive	2:05
18.	"London Dungeon" (live)	Evilive	2:14
19.	"Nike-A-Go-Go" (live)	Evilive	3:22
20.	"Hate Breeders" (live)	Evilive	2:39
21.	"Devil's Whorehouse" (live)	Evilive	1:41
22.	"All Hell Breaks Loose" (live)	Evilive	1:33
23.	"Horror Hotel" (live)	Evilive	1:12
24.	"Ghouls Night Out" (live)	Evilive	1:42
25.	"We Are 138" (live; featuring Henry Rollins)	Evilive	1:29
26.	"Earth A.D."	Earth A.D./Wolfs Blood	2:09
27.	"Queen Wasp"	Earth A.D./Wolfs Blood	1:32
28.	"Devilock"	Earth A.D./Wolfs Blood	1:25
29.	"Death Comes Ripping"	Earth A.D./Wolfs Blood	1:54
30.	"Green Hell"	Earth A.D./Wolfs Blood	1:53
31.	"Wolfsblood"	Earth A.D./Wolfs Blood	1:12
32.	"Demonomania"	Earth A.D./Wolfs Blood	0:45
33.	"Bloodfeast"	Earth A.D./Wolfs Blood	2:29
34.	"Hellhound"	Earth A.D./Wolfs Blood	1:16
Total length:			66:08

Disc 3: Studio sessions
No.	Title	Session	Length
1.	"Cough/Cool"	1977, sessions ("Cough/Cool" single)	2:09
2.	"She"	1977, sessions ("Cough/Cool" single)	1:19
3.	"Who Killed Marilyn?"	1979, C.I. Recording	2:00
4.	"Where Eagles Dare"	1979, C.I. Recording	2:03
5.	"Horror Business"	1979, C.I. Recording	2:44
6.	"Teenagers from Mars"	1979, C.I. Recording	2:32
7.	"Children in Heat"	1979, C.I. Recording	2:08
8.	"Night of the Living Dead"	1979, The Song Shop ("Night of the Living Dead" single)	2:04
9.	"Where Eagles Dare"	1979, The Song Shop ("Night of the Living Dead" single)	1:53
10.	"Vampira"	1979, The Song Shop	1:38
11.	"Violent World"	1979, The Song Shop	1:53
12.	"Who Killed Marilyn?"	1979, The Song Shop	1:53
13.	"Spook City USA"	1979, The Song Shop	2:15
14.	"Horror Business"	1979, The Song Shop	2:36
15.	"I Turned into a Martian"	September 5, 1980, Master Sound Productions	1:51
16.	"Skulls"	September 5, 1980, Master Sound Productions	1:54
17.	"Night of the Living Dead"	September 5, 1980, Master Sound Productions	1:53
18.	"Astro Zombies"	September 5, 1980, Master Sound Productions	2:15
19.	"Where Eagles Dare"	September 5, 1980, Master Sound Productions	1:39
20.	"Violent World"	September 5, 1980, Master Sound Productions	1:36
21.	"Halloween II"	September 5, 1980, Master Sound Productions	2:31
22.	"20 Eyes"	August 1981, Mix-O-Lydian	2:08
23.	"I Turned into a Martian"	August 1981, Mix-O-Lydian	2:00
24.	"Astro Zombies"	August 1981, Mix-O-Lydian	2:15
25.	"Vampira"	August 1981, Mix-O-Lydian	1:21
26.	"Devil's Whorehouse"	August 1981, Mix-O-Lydian	1:47
27.	"Nike-A-Go-Go"	August 1981, Mix-O-Lydian	2:41
28.	"Hate Breeders"	June 1981, Newfound Sound Studios	3:10
29.	"20 Eyes"	1986, Reel Platinum	1:41
30.	"Violent World"	1986, Reel Platinum	1:36
Total length:			61:48

Disc 4: Static Age
No.	Title	Length
1.	"Static Intro"	0:06
2.	"Static Age"	1:47
3.	"TV Casualty"	2:23
4.	"Some Kinda Hate"	2:01
5.	"Last Caress"	1:57
6.	"Return of the Fly"	1:36
7.	"Hybrid Moments"	1:42
8.	"We Are 138"	1:41
9.	"Teenagers from Mars"	2:50
10.	"Come Back"	4:59
11.	"Angelfuck"	1:37
12.	"Hollywood Babylon"	2:20
13.	"Attitude"	1:30
14.	"Bullet"	1:37
15.	"Theme for a Jackal"	2:35
16.	"Static outro"	0:08
Total length:		30:59

== Certifications ==
Region	Certification	Certified units/sales
United States (RIAA)	Gold	500,000^{‡}
^{‡} Sales+streaming figures based on certification alone.

== See also ==
- Misfits discography
