= We Are 138 =

Single by the Misfits

from the album Static Age
- B-side: "Attitude"; "Hollywood Babylon"
- Released: June 1978
- Recorded: January–February 1978
- Studio: C.I. (New York City)
- Genre: Punk rock
- Length: 1:42
- Label: Caroline
- Songwriter: Glenn Danzig
- Producers: Dave Achelis, Tom Bejgrowicz

"We Are 138" is a song by the American punk rock band Misfits. Written by vocalist Glenn Danzig, the song was recorded in 1978 and released that same year on the band's single "Bullet", sharing the A-side with the title track. It was also included as the opening track on the Misfits' 1980 EP Beware and the 1995 compilation album Collection II. "We Are 138" was recorded with the intention of it being included on the band's proposed debut album Static Age, which remained unreleased in its entirety until 1996.

== Recording and release ==
"We Are 138" was written by Glenn Danzig and recorded at C.I. Studios in New York by the Misfits in January–February 1978 for their proposed debut album Static Age. The song was first released on the B-side of the band's single "Bullet" in 1978, and would also be included as the opening track on their 1980 EP Beware, which combined tracks from the previously released "Bullet" and "Horror Business" singles. A live version of the song, recorded at a Misfits show in San Francisco, California, in 1981, was included on the 1982 EP Evilive. This version of the song features additional vocals by Henry Rollins, who was in the audience, and who joined in on a microphone while standing at the foot of the stage.

"We Are 138" was later included as the opening track on the 1995 compilation album Collection II. In 1996, Static Age was officially released in its entirety for the first time, as part of the boxed set The Misfits. "We Are 138" was among the Static Age tracks included in the boxed set, and it would also be included when Static Age received a standalone release in 1997.

== Lyrics and interpretations ==
The meaning of and inspiration for the song's lyrics have been subject to much interpretation. One common interpretation is that the song was inspired by the 1971 science fiction film THX 1138, directed by George Lucas, which is set in a dystopian future wherein the emotions and desires of the human population are controlled by android police. Misfits bassist Jerry Only and former Misfits guitarist Bobby Steele have reportedly supported this interpretation. Danzig's former bandmates have also recalled Danzig having created badges featuring a half-human half-android with the number "138" on its forehead. According to an email sent by Steele on July 1, 1996, to an online mailing list known as the Misfits Bible:

We used to have badges with a picture of a robot with 138 on his forehead. I wonder if Jerry has one, or remembers it... He [Danzig] used to tell us that if someone asked what it meant, we should just laugh, and in a mocking tone say 'What? You don't know?' and sound real snobby when you say it. Make them feel like every idiot but YOU knows what it means.

Only reportedly told a similar story to a fan after a performance on July 27, 1996, stating that the song "is like people being treated as androids where you have a number instead of a name. We had buttons made once, they were robots with '138' that looked like half human android kinda things." However, in a 2000 interview with TWEC.com, Danzig stated that the other members of the Misfits "didn't write it, and they don't know what the fuck it's about. It's about violence."

== Personnel ==
The Misfits

- Glenn Danzig – vocals
- Jerry Only – bass
- Franché Coma – guitar
- Mr. Jim – drums

Production

- Dave Achelis – engineer
- Tom Bejgrowicz – producer
