= Trouser Press =

Former American music magazine

- Cover of the April 1983 issue of Trouser Press magazine (#84), featuring The Clash.
- Categories: Music magazine
- Frequency: Monthly
- Founder: Ira Robbins, Dave Schulps and Karen Rose
- First issue: March 1974; 52 years ago
- Final issue Number: April 1984; 42 years ago 96
- Company: Trans-oceanic Trouser Press
- Country: United States
- Based in: New York City
- Language: English
- Website: trouserpress.com
- ISSN: 0164-1883

Trouser Press was a rock and roll magazine started in New York in 1974 as a mimeographed fanzine by editor/publisher Ira Robbins, fellow fan of the Who, Dave Schulps, and Karen Rose under the name "Trans-Oceanic Trouser Press" (a reference to a song by the Bonzo Dog Doo-Dah Band and an acronymic play on the British TV show Top of the Pops). Publication of the magazine ceased in 1984. The unexpired portion of mail subscriptions was completed by Rolling Stone sister publication Record, which itself folded in 1985. Trouser Press has continued to exist in various formats.

== History ==
The magazine's original scope was British bands and artists (early issues featured the slogan "America's Only British Rock Magazine"). Initial issues contained occasional interviews with major artists like Brian Eno and Robert Fripp and extensive record reviews. After 14 issues, the title was shortened to simply Trouser Press, and it gradually transformed into a professional magazine with color covers and advertising.

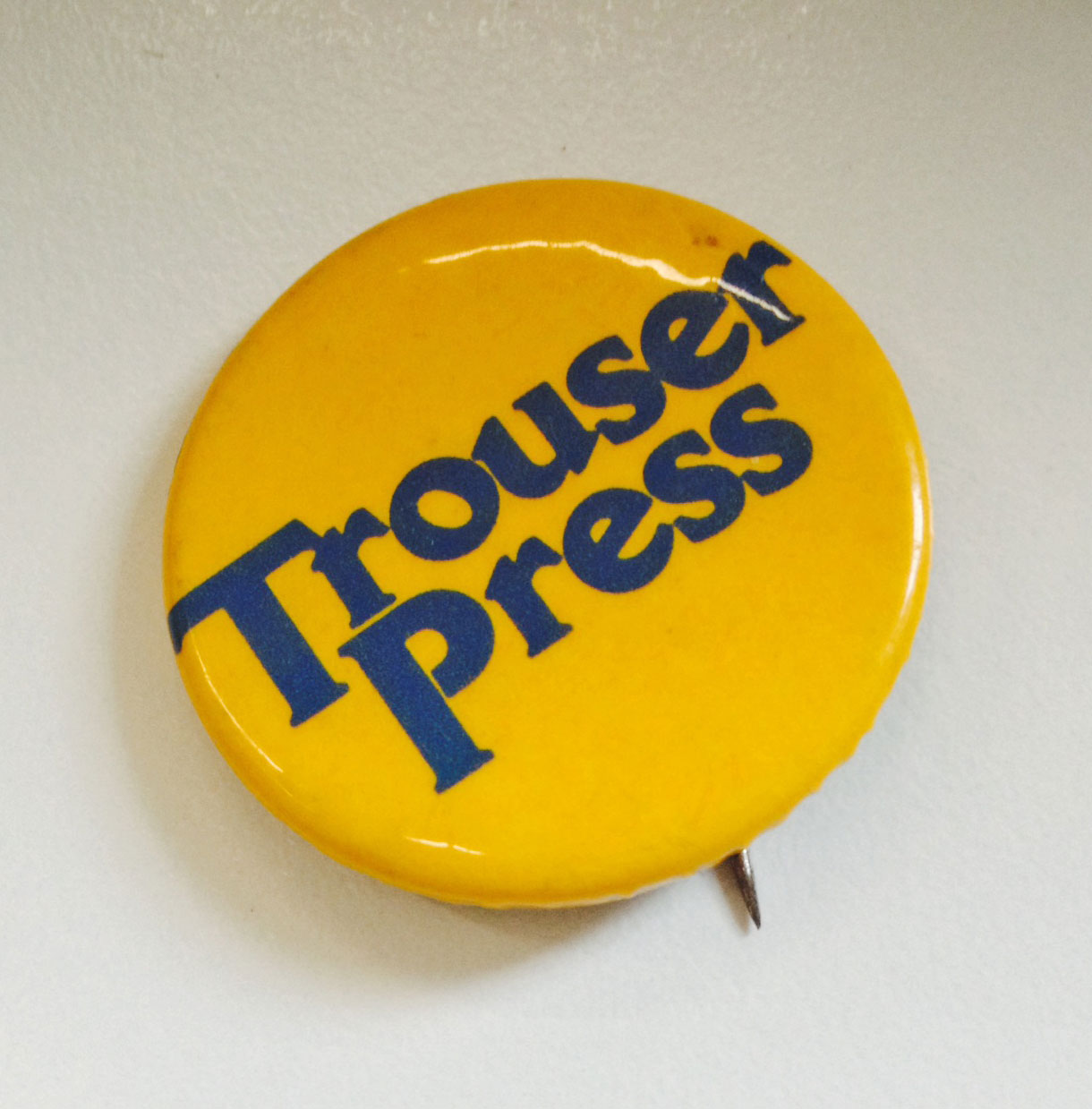
A Trouser Press badge (button), c. 1982.

As the 1970s music scene transformed, so did the magazine's editorial focus. From 1976 on, Trouser Press frequently centered on the growing punk movements in London, New Jersey, and New York. The magazine provided in-depth articles on bands such as the Sex Pistols, The Boomtown Rats, The Clash, The Damned, the Ramones, Television, The Misfits, and many other similar groups, long before other U.S. music publications did. In 1980, the magazine introduced "America Underground", a recurring column devoted to local music scenes from different areas of the country.

By the early 1980s, the magazine's focus was almost exclusively on new wave, alternative rock, and underground rock from both sides of the Atlantic. Starting in 1982, flexi-discs were included with subscription copies, eventually totaling 27 releases. Although the magazine seemed to be thriving, with an ever-growing circulation, editor Robbins ceased publication after the April 1984 issue (#96), citing a lack of interest in the continuing but stagnating new wave scene that left his writers with very little to say. Subscribers to Trouser Press received Record, Straight Arrow Publishers' monthly spinoff of Rolling Stone, to fulfill the remainder of their terms.

== Aftermath ==
As a concept, Trouser Press continued to evolve after the publication of the magazine ceased. In 1983, The Trouser Press Guide to New Wave Records, edited by Robbins, was published by Charles Scribner's Sons. The book was sufficiently popular for four more substantially updated editions, with varying titles and publishers, to be issued over the years, culminating in 1997's The Trouser Press Guide to '90s Rock. This final edition featured all-new entries on over 2,000 bands and reviews of approximately 8,500 records and CDs.

The contents of all five volumes are currently available on the Trouser Press website, which is updated with entries on new bands, as well as revisions/expansions of old articles, by Robbins and other writers. TrouserPress.com went online in 1997, and was relaunched in June 2020 with full scans of each issue of the magazine's ten-year run.

== See also ==
- Album era
- Christgau's Record Guide: Rock Albums of the Seventies
- Christgau's Record Guide: The '80s
- Rockism and poptimism
- Spin Alternative Record Guide
