= Last Caress =

1980 song by the Misfits

Song by the Misfits

from the EP Beware
- Released: January 1980
- Genre: Punk rock; horror punk
- Length: 1:58
- Label: Plan 9 Records
- Songwriter: Glenn Danzig
- Producers: Dave Achelis; Tom Bejgrowicz

Audio sample
- "Last Caress": file; help

"Last Caress" is a song by American punk rock band Misfits, first released on their 1980 EP Beware. Written by vocalist Glenn Danzig, the song was later included on the compilation album Collection II, released in 1995, as well as on the album Static Age, which was recorded in 1978 but not released in its entirety until 1996.

"Last Caress" is commonly considered to be one of the Misfits' greatest songs, and has been covered by a number of artists, including NOFX, AFI, and Metallica. The Metallica version, a medley titled "Last Caress/Green Hell", has achieved notoriety in its own right.

== Background and release ==
"Last Caress" first appeared as the final track on the Misfits' EP Beware, released in January 1980. The song was almost not included on the EP, as writer and vocalist Glenn Danzig was dissatisfied with the quality of the recording, but then-Misfits guitarist Bobby Steele convinced him to include it.

The song was later included on the Misfits' album Static Age, which was recorded in 1978 but not issued in its entirety until the release of the boxed set The Misfits in 1996. The song was later included on the compilation album Collection II, released in 1995. A live version of "Last Caress" was also included on the 1998 album Evillive II.

Since reforming the band without original vocalist Glenn Danzig, Jerry Only had changed the lyrics of the song to omit references to rape and infanticide, and eventually removed "Last Caress" from the Misfits' live set altogether. In a 2015 interview, Only cited seeing a television news piece about a couple raping, beating and starving their infant daughter to death as his reason for deleting Danzig's original "Last Caress" lyrics. After Danzig rejoined, the band has continued to play the song with all the original lyrics intact.

On January 28, 2026, "Last Caress" was officially certified Gold by the RIAA, marking one of the band's first-ever certified singles in the U.S.. It achieved this milestone alongside "Hybrid Moments" and "Dig Up Her Bones," driven by high streaming numbers, with "Last Caress" reaching 114.5 million streams

== Critical reception ==
In 2012, Aaron Lariviere of Stereogum ranked the song #2 on his list of the 10 best Misfits songs, writing that while it has been "practically played out ... the song still stands as one of the best the Misfits would ever produce. Heck, it's one of the best songs ever produced by the punk genre." In 2015, the song was also ranked #2 on an Ultimate Classic Rock list of the top 10 Misfits songs, with writer Eduardo Rivadavia calling it "simultaneously the Misfits' most offensive and singable ditty". The following year, Rivadavia included the song in an article published by Loudwire of "50 Disturbing Songs That People Love". Chris Kovatin of Kerrang! wrote that, with the song's opening lines, the Misfits "established themselves as everything creepier than everything else, and coined horror punk's unholy and everlasting legacy."

In a 2019 poll conducted by USA Today Network New Jersey regarding the greatest songs ever sung by an artist or band from New Jersey, "Last Caress" received the most votes with over 3,400 votes, beating "Born to Run" by Bruce Springsteen at over 660 votes, and "Blood and Roses" by the Smithereens at over 440 votes.

In his book This Music Leaves Stains: The Complete Story of the Misfits, author James Greene, Jr. interprets the song's lyrics as outlining "the bold confessions of a remorseless killer and rapist", and writes that the lyrics "are delivered by Danzig with such romantic melody that the crimes almost seem like triumphs."

== Personnel ==
The Misfits

- Glenn Danzig – vocals
- Jerry Only – bass
- Franche Coma – guitar
- Mr. Jim – drums

Production

- Dave Achelis – engineer
- Tom Bejgrowicz – producer

== Cover versions ==
"Last Caress" has been covered by such artists as David Pajo, Local H, AFI, Dum Dum Girls, HIPNOSIS, NOFX, and the all-female punk band the Ms. Fits. The Nutley Brass recorded an instrumental lounge cover of the song, which was included on their 2005 Misfits tribute album Fiend Club Lounge.

=== Metallica version ===
"Last Caress/Green Hell"

Song by Metallica

from the EP The $5.98 E.P. - Garage Days Re-Revisited and the album Garage Inc.
- Released: October 1987
- Genre: Crossover thrash
- Length: 3:28
- Label: Elektra
- Songwriter: Glenn Danzig
- Producer: Metallica

American heavy metal band Metallica released a back-to-back cover version of both "Last Caress" and another Misfits song, "Green Hell". The track, titled "Last Caress"/"Green Hell", was released on Metallica's 1987 EP The $5.98 E.P. - Garage Days Re-Revisited, as well as on their 1998 compilation album Garage Inc..

Beyond the Misfits arrangements, "Last Caress/Green Hell" also features the intro of the Iron Maiden song "Run to the Hills", deliberately played out of tune. "Last Caress" has become a staple of Metallica's live sets since they first covered it, with Setlist.fm having estimated that they have performed the track live at least 818 times. The "Green Hell" portion of the medley is often left out of shows, only having been performed live eleven times. Its most recent performance was in 2011 at the band's 30th anniversary shows where it was performed with Glenn Danzig.

Metallica infamously performed Last Caress and So What? by the Anti-Nowhere League at the 1996 MTV Europe Music Awards when they were supposed to perform "King Nothing". The band were told by MTV that they could not swear or use pyrotechnics, so they deviated from their plan to try and teach MTV a lesson. The band were banned from MTV for years after this incident, and any mention of the band and their set were removed from future broadcasts of the awards.

In 2015, "Last Caress/Green Hell" was ranked #23 on a Spin ranking of 151 Metallica songs, with staff member J.M.N. writing that "This medley of two of Glenn's early best retains the speed and attitude of the punk originals — with an added Iron Maiden outro to boot, for extra ingratiating geekery." In 2019, Matthew Wilkening of Ultimate Classic Rock named "Last Caress/Green Hell" as the best song from Garage Days Re-Revisited, calling it "an inspired medley". Metallica appears to no longer perform "Last Caress" in concert, having last played it in 2018.

=== Personnel ===
- James Hetfield – lead vocals, rhythm guitar
- Kirk Hammett – lead guitar
- Jason Newsted – bass guitar, backing vocals
- Lars Ulrich – drums

== Certifications ==
Region	Certification	Certified units/sales
United States (RIAA)	Gold	500,000^{‡}
^{‡} Sales+streaming figures based on certification alone.
