= Collection II =

Compilation album by Misfits
- Released: November 14, 1995
- Genres: Horror punk; hardcore punk; punk rock
- Length: 35:13
- Label: Caroline
- Producer: Various

Misfits chronology
| Misfits (1986) | Collection II (1995) | The Misfits (1996) |

Professional ratings
Review scores
| Source | Rating |
|---|---|
| Allmusic | 4/5 stars |
| Punknews.org | 4.5/5 stars |

Collection II, also known as Misfits II, a compilation album of songs by the American punk rock band Misfits. Released on November 14, 1995, it serves as a companion album to the band's previous self-titled compilation. Both compilations collect all the early singles and the entire Earth A.D./Wolfs Blood album, and are meant to complement Walk Among Us (not represented because Warner Bros. owns the rights) and Legacy of Brutality with little overlap. All the early singles are supposed to be represented, although alternative versions of some songs are used instead of the original releases.

== Album information ==
Misfits II is controversial among fans because six of the tracks are not songs the Misfits recorded as a functioning band. They were recorded in 1986, several years after the Misfits broke up, by Glenn Danzig and Samhain bassist Eerie Von for a sequel to Walk Among Us.

"Cough/Cool" uses the drum track of the original Misfits version, but Danzig overdubbed guitar and drum machine tracks and new vocals. The song originally had no guitar at all, and was recorded when the Misfits were a three-piece of keyboards, bass and drums. The four Walk Among Us-era tracks ("Hate Breeders", "Braineaters", "Nike-A-Go-Go", and "Devil's Whorehouse") included on Collection II were also recorded during the same sessions, and featured no participation by any other Misfits. Jerry Only is adamant that "Braineaters" was recorded only once by the Misfits. "Mephisto Waltz" was rehearsed by the Misfits but never recorded by the band.

"We Are 138" and "Attitude" are the tracks from the Bullet EP that were not present on Collection I. There is very little difference between these and the mixes on the Static Age LP.

"Last Caress" is from the Beware EP. This mix, exclusive to this compilation and not included on the box set, is characterized by its use of reverb and more prominent guitar.

"Return of the Fly" is a song recorded at the same time as the above three during the Static Age sessions, but had previously only been available via bootlegs.

"Children in Heat" is taken from the Horror Business EP. It was originally conceived as the second part of a medley with "Teenagers From Mars," and was mixed together with that song for the Horror Business EP. The engineer's introduction at the beginning of "Teenagers from Mars," announcing the take, mentions both songs. For the Beware EP, the intro was kept, even though "Children in Heat" was replaced by "Last Caress". The intro was also kept for Collection I, even though "Children in Heat" was nowhere to be found.

"Rat Fink" is taken from the Night of the Living Dead EP, and is the only song on the EP to appear on this record or on Collection I. (the other two tracks on the EP can only be found on CD3 of the Box Set). "Rat Fink" is also the only cover (by Allan Sherman) the Misfits recorded during their initial run.

"Horror Hotel" is the final 3 Hits from Hell track re-released to CD.

"Halloween" and "Halloween II" are taken from the Halloween 7-inch. These tracks are alternate versions of the tracks included on Legacy of Brutality and the aborted 12 Hits From Hell album. Unlike songs such as "Halloween" and "Halloween II" do not reference the movies of the same name. Instead, they point to the darker pagan undertones Danzig would pursue later with Samhain.

"We Bite" is taken from the Die, Die My Darling single, which is also included on the Earth A.D. CD.

"Queen Wasp," "Demonomania," "Hellhound," and "Bloodfeast" are the remaining Earth A.D. tracks not included in Collection I.

== Track listing ==
All songs written by Glenn Danzig except "Rat Fink" written by Allan Sherman, Johnnie Lee Wills and Deacon Anderson.

1. "We Are 138" – 1:41
2. "Attitude" – 1:30
3. "Cough/Cool" – 2:16
4. "Last Caress" – 2:00
5. "Return of the Fly" – 1:36
6. "Children in Heat" – 2:07
7. "Rat Fink" – 1:52
8. "Horror Hotel" – 1:27
9. "Halloween" – 1:52
10. "Halloween II" – 2:13
11. "Hate Breeders" – 2:45
12. "Braineaters" – 0:59
13. "Nike-A-Go-Go" – 2:15
14. "Devil's Whorehouse" – 1:49
15. "Mephisto Waltz" – 1:45
16. "We Bite" – 1:14
17. "Queen Wasp" – 1:32
18. "Demonomania" – 0:44
19. "Hellhound" – 1:15
20. "Bloodfeast" – 2:31

== Personnel ==
- Glenn Danzig – vocals, electric piano, overdubbed guitar
- Franché Coma – guitar on tracks 1, 2, 4, and 5
- Bobby Steele – guitar on tracks 6–8
- Doyle Wolfgang von Frankenstein – guitar on tracks 8–11, and 16–20
- Jerry Only – bass on tracks 1–10, 14, and 16–20
- Eerie Von – bass and drums tracks 11–15
- Manny Martínez – drums on track 3
- Mr. Jim – drums on tracks 1, 2, 4, and 5
- Joey Image – drums on tracks 6 and 7
- Arthur Googy – drums on tracks 8–10
- ROBO – drums on tracks 16–20
