= Halloween (Misfits song) =

1981 single by the Misfits

- The single's cover photograph shows the band's lineup at the time of its release. Left to right: Jerry Only, Arthur Googy, Glenn Danzig, and Doyle.

Single by the Misfits
- A-side: "Halloween"
- B-side: "Halloween II"
- Released: October 31, 1981
- Recorded: August 1980
- Genre: Horror punk; punk rock; Halloween music
- Length: 4:06
- Label: Plan 9
- Songwriter: Glenn Danzig
- Producer: Misfits

Misfits singles chronology
"Night of the Living Dead" (1979)	"Halloween" (1981)	"Die, Die My Darling" (1984)

"Halloween" is the fifth single by the American punk rock band Misfits. It was released on October 31, 1981 on singer Glenn Danzig's label Plan 9 Records. 5,000 copies of the single were pressed on black 7-inch vinyl, some of which included a lyrics sheet. This was the first Misfits release to use their Famous Monsters of Filmland-inspired logo, as well as the first to refer to the band as simply "Misfits".

"Halloween" is Misfits first release to not feature guitarist Bobby Steele, who because of absence during the band's rehearsals was replaced by Jerry's brother and Bobby's guitar tech Doyle Wolfgang von Frankenstein.

The lyrics to "Halloween II" are in nonstandard Latin, translating to:

Ancient formulas of exorcisms and excommunications
That witches and those made wolves believe
I maim now the demon clothed in wolfskin
Having to hide in the hollow of a tree
I say werewolves can change shapes

== Re-releases and other versions ==
Following the band's breakup in 1983, the 12 Hits from Hell version of "Halloween" was reissued on the 1985 compilation album Legacy of Brutality, one of the few tracks on the album not to have overdubbed guitar and bass tracks recorded by Danzig. The single versions of both songs were re-released on Collection II in 1995, and all of the versions were included in The Misfits box set in 1996, along with the 12 Hits from Hell studio recording of "Halloween II".

== Track listing ==
All tracks are written by Glenn Danzig.

Side A
No.	Title	Length
1.	"Halloween"	1:53

Side B
No.	Title	Length
1.	"Halloween II"	2:13
Total length:		4:06

== Personnel ==
- Glenn Danzig – lead vocals
- Jerry Only – bass
- Arthur Googy – drums
- Doyle – guitar

== Cover versions ==
Mudhoney included a sample of "Halloween" in their 1988 cover of Sonic Youth's song of the same title on the "Touch Me I'm Sick"/"Halloween" split single. "Halloween" has been covered by several other bands in subsequent years: East Bay punk rock AFI covered the song for their All Hallow's EP (1999), and Dropkick Murphys recorded a version for the compilation Back on the Streets: Japanese/American Punk Unity (2000) which was later re-released on Singles Collection, Volume 2 (2005). The American death metal band Winds of Plague recorded a cover of the song that they included as an iTunes bonus track on their 2009 album The Great Stone War.

Danzig re-recorded "Halloween II" with his post-Misfits project Samhain. This version appeared on November-Coming-Fire (1986) and Live 85-86 (2001). "Halloween II" has also been covered by Tenebre on the tribute album Hell on Earth: A Tribute to the Misfits (2000) and by Cradle of Filth on the Underworld: Evolution soundtrack and Thornography (2006), though Cradle of Filth's cover is based on the Samhain version.

=== Alkaline Trio version ===
"Halloween"

Single by Alkaline Trio
- A-side: "Halloween"
- B-side: "Children in Heat"
- Released: October 31, 2002
- Recorded: August 2002
- Label: Asian Man (AM-097)
- Songwriter: Glenn Danzig

Alkaline Trio singles chronology
"Stupid Kid" (2002)	"Halloween" (2002)	"We've Had Enough" (2003)

The punk rock band Alkaline Trio recorded a cover version of "Halloween" in August 2002 while on tour. Their version was released as a single through Asian Man Records, with a cover of "Children in Heat" (from "Horror Business") as the B-side, and given away exclusively to attendees at their performance on October 31, 2002 at the Metro Chicago. This performance was filmed and released on DVD in 2003 as Halloween at the Metro, the fourth installment in Kung Fu Films' The Show Must Go Off! series. In 2004 the band re-released the single as a download exclusively to members of their fan club the Blood Pact, adding a cover of The Damned's "Wait for the Blackout" recorded in 2003 at the BBC's Maida Vale Studios.

==== Track listing ====
All tracks are written by Glenn Danzig, except where noted.

Side A
No.	Title	Length
1.	"Halloween"

Side B
No.	Title	Length
1.	"Children in Heat"

Blood Pact download version
No.	Title	Writer(s)	Length
1.	"Halloween"
2.	"Children in Heat"
3.	"Wait for the Blackout" (BBC session; originally performed by The Damned)	Rat Scabies, Captain Sensible, Paul Gray, Dave Vanian, Billy Karloff

==== Personnel ====
- Matt Skiba – guitar, lead vocals
- Dan Andriano – bass
- Derek Grant – drums

== See also ==
- Misfits discography
