= Bullet (Misfits song) =

- The single's cover art depicts the John F. Kennedy assassination, the subject of "Bullet".

Single by the Misfits

from the album Static Age
- A-side: "Bullet"; "We Are 138"
- B-side: "Attitude"; "Hollywood Babylon"
- Released: June 1978
- Recorded: January–February 1978
- Length: 7:02
- Label: Plan 9 (PL 1001)
- Songwriter(s): Glenn Danzig

Misfits singles chronology
| "Cough/Cool" (1977) | "Bullet" (1978) | "Horror Business" (1979) |

"Bullet" is the second single released by the horror punk band the Misfits. The four tracks comprising the EP were recorded, along with thirteen others, in early 1978 for the proposed Static Age album. When the band could not find a record label to release the album, they instead released four of the songs as "Bullet" on singer Glenn Danzig's label Plan 9 Records. The songs were re-released in different versions over subsequent years, until Static Age was finally released in its entirety in 1996.

== Background ==
In August 1977 the Misfits released their debut single "Cough/Cool" on Blank Records, a label operated by singer Glenn Danzig. Several months later Mercury Records issued a Pere Ubu record on their own Blank Records imprint, unaware that Danzig held a trademark on the name. They offered him thirty hours of studio time in exchange for the rights to the Blank Records name, which he accepted. In January and February 1978 the Misfits, then consisting of Danzig, guitarist Franché Coma, bassist Jerry Only, and drummer Mr. Jim, recorded seventeen songs at C.I. Recordings in New York City with engineer and producer Dave Achelis. Because of the time constraints, they recorded the songs live in the studio with only a few takes each and very few overdubs. They mixed fourteen of them with Achelis for their proposed first album, to be titled Static Age. However, the band were unable to find a record label interested in releasing the album, and instead released four of the tracks as the "Bullet" EP in June 1978 on Danzig's new label Plan 9 Records.

The song "Bullet" references the 1963 assassination of John F. Kennedy, with sexually explicit lyrics directed at his wife Jacqueline Kennedy Onassis: "Texas is an outrage when your husband is dead/Texas is an outrage when they pick up his head/Texas is the reason that the President's dead/You gotta suck, suck, Jackie, suck".

== Pressing information ==
The first pressing of "Bullet" consisted of 1,000 copies on black 7" vinyl with a gatefold cover and lyrics sheet. These copies had "distributed by Ork" printed on the back sleeve, as a distribution deal with Ork Records had been planned, but distribution through Ork never took place. A second pressing of 2,000 on red vinyl had a different back cover, removing the band photo and mention of Ork and replacing it with artwork of a bullet hole and the words "better dead on red". 7,000 additional copies were later pressed on black vinyl with the same cover as the second pressing.

== Re-releases and other versions ==
All four songs from "Bullet" were reissued on the Beware EP in January 1980, and a live version of "We Are 138" appeared on the Evilive EP in 1982. The compilation album Misfits (1986), released three years after the band's breakup, included "Bullet" and "Hollywood Babylon", while Collection II (1995) included "We Are 138" and "Attitude".

The Misfits box set in 1996 presented the complete Static Age album for the first time, including all four tracks from the "Bullet" single. Static Age was also released as a separate album that July.

== Cover versions ==
"Bullet" was covered by Refused for the Children In Heat compilation, and the Hellacopters covered it on the tribute album Hell on Earth: A Tribute to the Misfits (2000). Entombed also covered "Hollywood Babylon" on the same album. "Attitude" was covered by Sum 41, the Slackers, and Guns N' Roses. In 2014, Energy covered the song as part of their 7-song Misfits tribute EP.

== Track listing ==
All tracks are written by Glenn Danzig.

Side A
| No. | Title | Length |
|---|---|---|
| 1. | "Bullet" | 1:37 |
| 2. | "We Are 138" | 1:40 |

Side B
| No. | Title | Length |
|---|---|---|
| 1. | "Attitude" | 1:28 |
| 2. | "Hollywood Babylon" | 2:17 |
| Total length: | | 7:02 |

== Personnel ==
=== Band ===
- Glenn Danzig – vocals
- Franché Coma – guitar, backing vocals
- Jerry Only – bass guitar, backing vocals
- Mr. Jim – drums

=== Production ===
- Dave Achelis – engineering
- Rich Flores – mastering

== See also ==
- Misfits discography
- Assassination of John F. Kennedy in popular culture
