= Plan 9 Records =

- Founded: 1977
- Founder: Glenn Danzig
- Defunct: 1995
- Status: Defunct
- Distributor: Caroline Records
- Genre: Punk rock
- Country of origin: United States
- Location: Lodi, New Jersey

Plan 9 Records, originally known as Blank Records, was an independent record label that was founded in 1977 by Glenn Danzig of the horror punk band the Misfits. The label was discontinued in 1995.

In 1977, Danzig founded Blank Records as a means to distribute music by his newly formed band, the Misfits. However, after only one release, the Misfits' first single "Cough/Cool" (1977), Cliff Burnstein of Mercury Records had wanted to use the same name for a sub-label. Danzig traded Mercury the rights to the name for studio time, which the Misfits used to record Static Age. Needing a new name for the label, Danzig decided on Plan 9 Records, a reference to the Ed Wood science fiction film Plan 9 from Outer Space (1957).

The label continued to release material by the Misfits and later solo efforts by Glenn Danzig and his post-Misfits band Samhain. The only release not to include Danzig was the Victims' Victims EP in 1978.

Starting in 1987, all material was distributed by Caroline Records.

In 1995, due to a legal settlement between Danzig and Misfits bassist Jerry Only, the label was discontinued.

== Roster ==
- The Misfits
- The Victims
- Glenn Danzig (solo efforts)
- Samhain

== Discography ==
Catalog number	Artist	Title	Date	Type	Note
Blank 101	The Misfits	"Cough/Cool"	1977	single	Released when the label was known as Blank Records
PL1001	The Misfits	Bullet	1978	EP	
PL1005	The Victims	Victims	1978	EP	Only non-Danzig recording released on Plan 9
PL1009	The Misfits	Horror Business	1979	EP	
PL1011	The Misfits	Night of the Living Dead (EP)	1979	EP	
PLP1	The Misfits	Beware	1980	EP	
PL1013	The Misfits	3 Hits from Hell	1981	EP	
PL1015	Glenn Danzig	Who Killed Marilyn?	1981	single	
PL1017	The Misfits	Halloween	1981	single	
PL1019	The Misfits	Evilive	1982	EP	
PL9-02	The Misfits	Earth A.D./Wolfsblood	1983	album	
PL9-03	The Misfits	Die, Die My Darling	1984	EP	
PL9-04	Samhain	Initium	1984	album	
PL9-05	Samhain	Unholy Passion EP	1985	EP	
PL9-06	The Misfits	Legacy of Brutality	1985	album	
PL9-07	Samhain	November-Coming-Fire	1986	album	
PL9-09	The Misfits	Collection I	1986	album	
PL9-08	The Misfits	Evilive	1987	album	
PL9-10	Samhain	Final Descent	1990	album	
PL9-11	Glenn Danzig	Black Aria	1992	album	

== See also ==
- List of record labels
