= Misfits (Misfits album) =

Compilation album by Misfits
- Released: July 1, 1986
- Recorded: January 1978; January 1979; August 1980; 1981; July 1983; 1985
- Genres: Horror punk; hardcore punk; punk rock
- Length: 40:20
- Label: Caroline
- Producers: Misfits, Spot

Misfits chronology
Legacy of Brutality (1985)	Misfits (1986)	Collection II (1995)

Misfits is a 1986 compilation album by the American punk rock band Misfits. Officially titled Misfits, but also known as Collection, Collection 1, or Collection I, the album features twenty songs by the band. The tracks include some of the group's early singles, as well as songs from their 1982 album Walk Among Us, their 1983 album Earth A.D./Wolfs Blood, and the 1985 compilation album Legacy of Brutality, which was curated exclusively by vocalist Glenn Danzig after the band had dissolved in 1983.

Collection I was first released on July 1, 1986, by Plan 9 and Caroline Records, and was followed by Collection II in 1995. Both Collection albums were included in the boxed set The Misfits, which was released in 1996.

== Release ==
Collection I was released on CD on July 1, 1986, by Plan 9 Records (which was Glenn Danzig's own label) and Caroline Records. It was released as a 12" vinyl LP and cassette in October 1988. Upon release, Danzig was the only member of the Misfits receiving royalties for Collection I, along with the 1985 compilation album Legacy of Brutality and the 1987 live album Evilive. This led to a series of legal battles between Danzig and his former bandmates Jerry Only and Doyle Wolfgang von Frankenstein.

In 1995, an agreement regarding the royalties for Misfits releases by Caroline Records was reached, wherein all future royalties would be pro-rated by instrument and track depending on the performer. As a result, Danzig only received a full third of royalties for Collection I; another third was split between guitarists Franché Coma, Doyle, and Bobby Steele, and the remaining third was split between drummers Mr. Jim, Joey Image, Arthur Googy, and Robo.

== Critical reception ==
Professional ratings
Review scores
Source	Rating
AllMusic	4.5/5 stars
Spin Alternative Record Guide	8/10

John Dougan of AllMusic gave Collection I a rating of four out of five stars, writing: "Purists may disagree, but for the benighted, [Collection I] is the best place to start -- a 20-track anthology that gives you the most Misfits for your money. Everything that made the Misfits great is here, including the odd remix, alternate take, and re-edited version." In his book The Complete Misfits Discography, author Robert Michael "Bobb" Cotter wrote that "True Fiends already had about at least a dozen versions of the songs on this compilation, but if you are indeed one, well, you'd have to get it anyway. At least there are some previously-unreleased versions of stuff with better sound quality than if you previously heard it on a boot."

Javier Van Huss, former bass guitarist for the band Eighteen Visions, noted that the album was instrumental in his early "love of the Misfits", stating that "Collection 1 on cassette was the first of Danzig's musical endeavors that I purchased with my own money."

== Track listing ==
All songs written by Glenn Danzig.

Side one
No.	Title	Length
1.	"She"	1:22
2.	"Hollywood Babylon"	2:20
3.	"Bullet"	1:38
4.	"Horror Business"	2:45
5.	"Teenagers from Mars"	2:43
6.	"Night of the Living Dead"	1:57
7.	"Where Eagles Dare"	2:07
8.	"Vampira"	1:21
9.	"I Turned into a Martian"	1:43
10.	"Skulls"	1:59
Total length:		19:55

Side two
No.	Title	Length
11.	"London Dungeon"	2:34
12.	"Ghouls Night Out"	1:58
13.	"Astro Zombies"	2:11
14.	"Mommy Can I Go Out and Kill Tonight?"	2:01
15.	"Die, Die My Darling"	3:09
16.	"Earth A.D."	2:09
17.	"Devilock"	1:26
18.	"Death Comes Ripping"	1:53
19.	"Green Hell"	1:53
20.	"Wolfs Blood"	1:11
Total length:		20:25

== Personnel ==
The Misfits

- Glenn Danzig – vocals, overdubbed guitar
- Jerry Only – bass guitar, background vocals
- Franché Coma – guitar on tracks 1–3
- Bobby Steele – guitar on tracks 4–13
- Doyle Wolfgang von Frankenstein – guitar, background vocals on tracks 6, 8–10, and 12–20
- Mr. Jim – drums on tracks 1–3
- Joey Image – drums on tracks 4, 5, and 7
- Arthur Googy – drums on tracks 6, 8–13, and 15
- Robo – drums on tracks 14, and 16–20

== Charts ==
Chart performance for Misfits
Chart (2026)	Peak position
Greek Albums (IFPI)	36
