= Static Age =

Studio album by the Misfits
- Released: February 27, 1996
- Recorded: January–February 1978
- Studios: C.I., New York City
- Genres: Horror punk; punk rock
- Length: 35:02
- Label: Caroline
- Producers: Dave Achelis; Tom Bejgrowicz

The Misfits chronology
The Misfits (1996)	Static Age (1996)	American Psycho (1997)

Professional ratings
Review scores
Source	Rating
AllMusic	3.5/5 stars
Kerrang!	4/5 stars
Pitchfork	8.8/10
Spin	4/5 stars
Tiny Mix Tapes	5/5 marks

Static Age is the third studio album by the American horror punk band Misfits, recorded in 1978. Although it was the first album the band ever recorded, it was not released in its entirety until 1996.

== History ==
In August 1977 the Misfits released their debut single "Cough/Cool" on Blank Records, a label operated by the band's lead vocalist Glenn Danzig. Several months later Mercury Records issued a Pere Ubu record on their own Blank Records imprint, unaware that Danzig held a trademark on the name. The parties came to a settlement, with Danzig accepting thirty hours of studio time for his band in exchange for the rights to the Blank Records name. In January and February 1978 the Misfits, then consisting of Danzig, guitarist Franché Coma, bassist Jerry Only, and drummer Mr. Jim, recorded seventeen songs at C.I. Recordings in New York City with engineer and producer Dave Achelis. Due to time constraints, the band recorded the songs live in the studio with only a few takes and very few overdubs. Ultimately fourteen of the seventeen tracks produced during the sessions were assembled for the Misfits' anticipated debut album, to be titled Static Age.

However, the band were unable to find a record label interested in releasing the album. Instead, the Misfits released four of the new tracks ("Bullet", "We Are 138", "Attitude", and "Hollywood Babylon") as the "Bullet" single in June 1978 on Danzig's newly created label Plan 9 Records (the same four tracks, along with a remixed version of "Last Caress", were reissued on the Beware EP in January 1980). While on tour in Canada that October, guitarist Franché Coma abruptly quit the band, followed by drummer Mr. Jim at the tour's conclusion. With the band's future far from certain, the Static Age recordings were shelved indefinitely. Danzig recruited new members Bobby Steele and Joey Image and the Misfits shifted their style away from the traditional punk rock of the Static Age sessions to a more horror film-inspired direction. None of the remaining Static Age tracks were released during the early era of the band, though a re-recorded version of "Teenagers from Mars" appeared on the "Horror Business" single in 1979, and a live version of "We Are 138" appeared on the Evilive EP in 1982.

After the band's breakup in 1983, Danzig overdubbed guitar and bass tracks on nine of the unreleased Static Age tracks ("Static Age", "TV Casualty", "Hybrid Moments", "Come Back", "Some Kinda Hate", "Theme for a Jackal", "Angelfuck", "Spinal Remains", and "She"), releasing these new versions on the 1985 Legacy of Brutality compilation album. Misfits followed in 1986, reissuing the tracks "Bullet" and "Hollywood Babylon" as well as the overdubbed version of "She". Collection II (1995) reissued "We Are 138" and "Attitude", the remixed version of "Last Caress", and the previously unreleased "Return of the Fly".

With the release of the Misfits box set in 1996, the complete original Static Age album saw the light of day for the first time on CD, eighteen years after the songs were recorded. The box set included all three compilation albums as well as a disc with all fourteen Static Age tracks that had been mixed in 1978. The remaining three tracks, "She", "Spinal Remains", and "In the Doorway", were mixed by Alan Douches and Tom Bejgrowicz on February 24, 1997, at West West Side Music and were included when Static Age was finally released as a standalone album that July. "In the Doorway" had never before been released, as it had remained unmixed on the master tapes for nineteen years. The album also included an unlisted eighteenth track consisting of a collage of studio banter and outtakes.

== Songs ==
Several of the songs on Static Age were based on horror films and American historical events from the 1960s and 1970s. "Return of the Fly" borrows its title from the 1959 film Return of the Fly, and most of the song's lyrics consist of repetition of the film's title, actors, and characters: "Return of the Fly, Return of the Fly/With Vincent Price/Helen Delambre, Helen Delambre/François, François/Cecile, Cecile". "Bullet" references the 1963 assassination of President John F. Kennedy, with sexually explicit lyrics directed at his wife Jacqueline Kennedy Onassis: "Texas is an outrage when your husband is dead/Texas is an outrage when they pick up his head/Texas is the reason that the President's dead/You gotta suck, suck, Jackie, suck". Although the subject of "She" is not mentioned in the lyrics, Misfits associate Eerie Von noted in The Misfits box set that the song was about Patty Hearst. The lyrics reference Hearst's participation in a San Francisco bank robbery in 1974: "She walked out with empty arms, machine gun in her hand/She is good and she is bad, no one understands/She walked in in silence, never spoke a word/She's got a rich daddy, she's her daddy's girl". "Hollywood Babylon" borrows its title from Kenneth Anger's 1959 book Hollywood Babylon.

== Influence ==
Early in his amateur career, Mike Diana, who would later become the first American artist to be convicted of obscenity in the United States, produced a 1988 comics magazine called Angelfuck, which was named after the song on this album.

The indie rock band Texas Is the Reason later derived their name from the lyrics of "Bullet".

== Track listing ==
All tracks are written by Glenn Danzig.

No.	Title	Length
1.	"Static Age"	1:47
2.	"TV Casualty"	2:24
3.	"Some Kinda Hate"	2:02
4.	"Last Caress"	1:57
5.	"Return of the Fly"	1:37
6.	"Hybrid Moments"	1:42
7.	"We Are 138"	1:41
8.	"Teenagers from Mars"	2:51
9.	"Come Back"	5:00
10.	"Angelfuck"	1:38
11.	"Hollywood Babylon"	2:20
12.	"Attitude"	1:31
13.	"Bullet"	1:38
14.	"Theme for a Jackal"	2:41
15.	"She"	1:24
16.	"Spinal Remains"	1:27
17.	"In the Doorway"	1:25
Total length:		35:02

== Personnel ==
=== The Misfits ===
- Glenn Danzig – lead vocals, electric piano on track 14
- Jerry Only – bass, backing vocals
- Franché Coma – guitars, backing vocals
- Mr. Jim – drums

=== Studio personnel ===
- Dave Achelis – producer, engineer, and mixer
- Alan Douches – mixing of tracks 15–17, mastering
- Tom Bejgrowicz – mixing of tracks 15–17, production and coordination of reissue
- Pete Ciccone – art and design
