= Who Killed Marilyn? =

Single by Glenn Danzig
- B-side: "Spook City USA"
- Released: August 5, 1981
- Genre: Horror punk
- Songwriter(s): Glenn Danzig

Glenn Danzig singles chronology
"Who Killed Marilyn?" (1981)	"Mother" (1988)

"Who Killed Marilyn?" is a 1981 song by Glenn Danzig, about questions surrounding the death of actress Marilyn Monroe, with the titular question suggesting she was murdered. Though Danzig's first solo single, other recordings of the song have since been included on various collections by Danzig's group The Misfits.

The B-side, "Spook City USA", was also recorded previously with the Misfits during the Night of the Living Dead EP session, but that much faster version was not released until the 1996 release of the Misfits box set.

Danzig claims that he and Misfits drummer Googy could not get Jerry and guitarist Doyle to practice and perform more often, and "Who Killed Marilyn?" fulfilled Danzig's need to perform and release his songs on a more regular basis. Jerry claims he had no reason not to do the songs and doesn't know why Danzig released a solo single.

"Who Killed Marilyn?" continued Danzig's obsession with the darker underside of American pop culture, as seen from the very first single's "She" (about Patty Hearst) to such songs as "Violent World" and "American Nightmare". Other versions of this song have been released by the Misfits (Legacy of Brutality, the box set, etc.), but the Glenn Danzig version recorded on this 45, along with the B-side, "Spook City USA", are only available on this 45 and have never been released on CD.

== Cover versions ==
"Who Killed Marilyn?" was covered by Link 80 as a hidden track on their debut 1996 album 17 Reasons. It was not included on the tracklist, and played eight minutes after the last listed song.

It was also covered by Steve Zing's band Doomtree when they performed live on WMFU radio on March 27, 2003
