= Die, Die My Darling =

1984 single by Misfits

- The single's cover artwork was derived from a 1953 issue of Chamber of Chills.

Single by the Misfits
- B-side: "We Bite"; "Mommy, Can I Go Out and Kill Tonight?"
- Released: May 1984
- Recorded: August 1981 and October 1982
- Genre: Horror punk
- Length: 3:11
- Label: Plan 9
- Songwriter: Glenn Danzig
- Producer: Spot

Misfits singles chronology
"Halloween" (1981)	"Die, Die My Darling" (1984)	"Dig Up Her Bones" (1997)

Professional ratings
Review scores
Source	Rating
AllMusic	3/5 stars

"Die, Die My Darling" is a song by the American horror punk band Misfits. It was released in May 1984 on singer Glenn Danzig's label, Plan 9 Records, seven months after the band's breakup. The song is titled after the 1965 horror film Fanatic, which had been released in the United States under the title Die! Die! My Darling! The cover of the single is derived from the cover of the September 1953 issue number 19 of the comic book Chamber of Chills. The back cover artwork was created by artist Pushead.

== Background ==
The "Die, Die My Darling" single was released nine months after the Misfits' October 1983 breakup. "Die, Die My Darling" was recorded in August 1981 during sessions for Walk Among Us, but was not included on the album. A live version of "Mommy, Can I Go Out & Kill Tonight?" did appear on Walk Among Us, which was released in March 1982. "We Bite" and the studio version of "Mommy, Can I Go Out & Kill Tonight?" were recorded in a different session in October 1982. "Die, Die My Darling" was remixed and added, along with "We Bite", to the international version of the 1983 album Earth A.D./Wolfs Blood. All three tracks were added to subsequent reissues of Earth A.D./Wolfs Blood, in addition to being released as the "Die, Die My Darling" single.

== Release ==
The first pressing run of "Die, Die My Darling" consisted of 5000 black and 500 purple 12" vinyl copies, all with "C&P Hell-bent Music" on center labels. The second pressing run consisted of 500 white 12" vinyl copies. The vinyl has since been reprinted through Caroline Records.

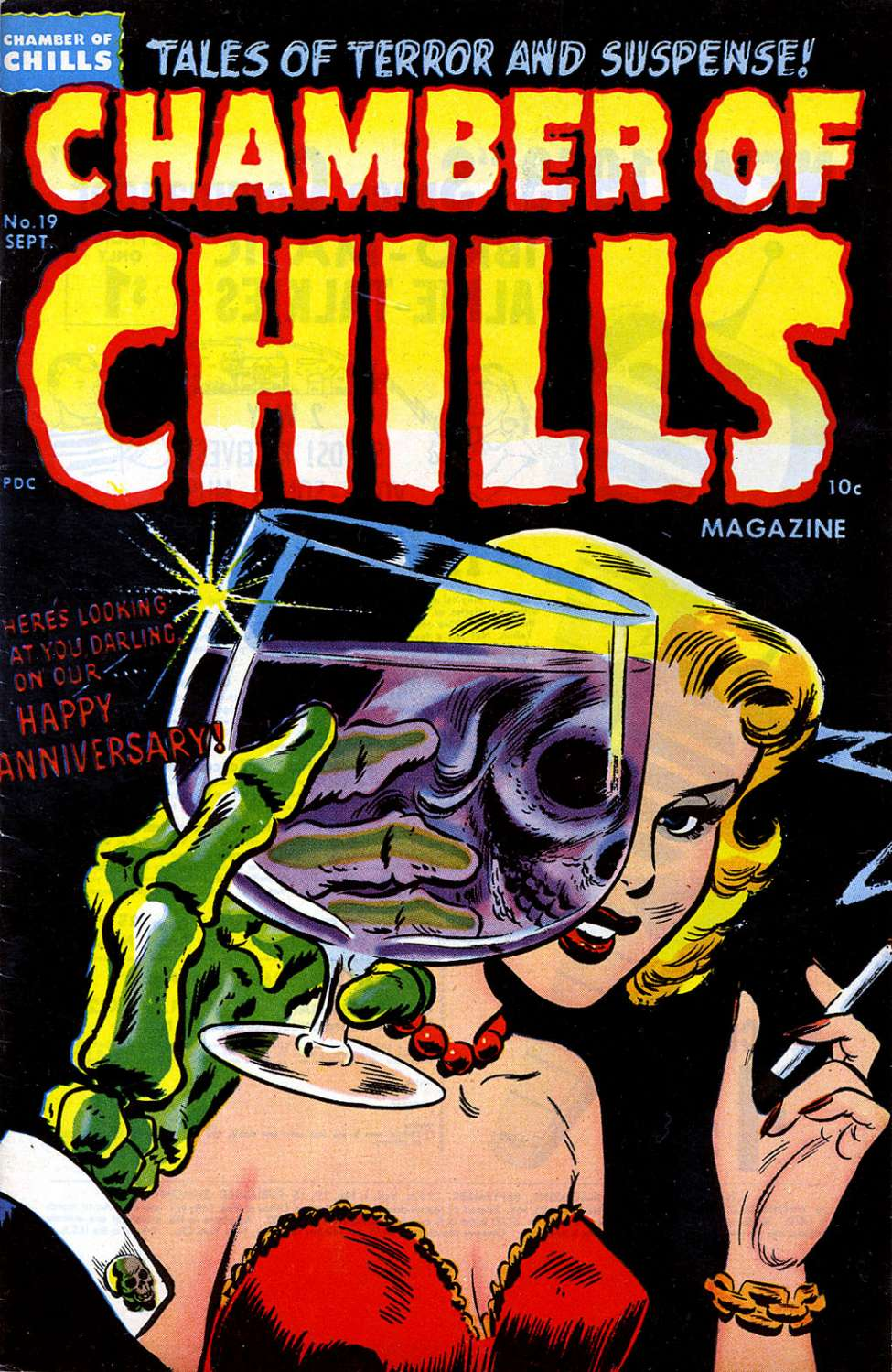
The cover of the single was derived from issue 19 of Chamber of Chills, September 1953.

"Die, Die My Darling" and "Mommy, Can I Go Out & Kill Tonight?" were both included on the 1986 compilation album Misfits, while "We Bite" was included on Collection II in 1995. All three tracks were included in the boxed set The Misfits, released in 1996.

== Critical reception ==
Victor W. Valdivia of AllMusic reviewed "Die, Die My Darling" positively, and wrote that the title song "ranks among the best the Misfits ever recorded -- pure, brutal energy unleashed." Aaron Lariviere of Stereogum ranked "Die, Die My Darling" as the best Misfits song, writing that "Never once does the energy flag. The stomp that launches the song out the gate carries through the entire running time, building up to stomp even harder before crumbling to chaos at the end", and calling it "the perfect sendoff for one of the best punk bands of all time". In 2022, Consequence ranked the song at number two on their list of the 10 best Misfits songs.

== Track listing ==
All tracks are written by Glenn Danzig.

Side A
No.	Title	Length
1.	"Die, Die My Darling"	3:11

Side B
No.	Title	Length
1.	"We Bite"	1:15
2.	"Mommy, Can I Go Out and Kill Tonight?"	2:03
Total length:		6:29

== Personnel ==
The Misfits

- Glenn Danzig – vocals
- Doyle – guitar
- Jerry Only – bass
- Arthur Googy – drums on "Die, Die My Darling"
- Robo – drums on "Mommy, Can I Go Out & Kill Tonight?" and "We Bite"

Production

- Spot – production

== Metallica version ==
"Die, Die My Darling"

Single by Metallica

from the album Garage Inc.
- B-side: "Sabbra Cadabra" (live) / "Mercyful Fate" (live)
- Released: June 7, 1999
- Recorded: September and October 1998
- Studio: The Plant (Sausalito, California)
- Genre: Heavy metal
- Length: 2:29
- Label: Elektra
- Songwriter: Glenn Danzig
- Producers: Bob Rock; James Hetfield; Lars Ulrich; Mark Whitaker

Metallica singles chronology
"Whiskey in the Jar" (1999)	"Die, Die My Darling" (1999)	"Nothing Else Matters '99" (1999)

"Die, Die My Darling" was covered by the American heavy metal band Metallica, who had previously covered the Misfits songs "Last Caress" and "Green Hell" in 1987, for their 1998 cover album Garage Inc. Metallica's version was released as a single in Australia, Germany, Japan, and Mexico, and reached number 26 on Billboard's Mainstream Rock Tracks chart in the United States.

Misfits guitarist Doyle praised the cover version saying that "I couldn't believe it when I first heard it!"

=== Track listing ===
Australian version
No.	Title	Writer(s)	Length
1.	"Die, Die My Darling" (originally performed by the Misfits)	Glenn Danzig	2:29
2.	"Sabbra Cadabra" (live; originally performed by Black Sabbath)	Tony Iommi, Geezer Butler, Bill Ward	7:05
3.	"Mercyful Fate" (live; medley of songs originally performed by Mercyful Fate)	King Diamond, Hank Shermann	11:11
4.	"Whiskey in the Jar" (cover of Thin Lizzy version)	traditional	5:05
5.	"Turn the Page" (originally performed by Bob Seger)	Bob Seger	6:06
Total length:			31:56

German and Japanese versions
No.	Title	Writer(s)	Length
1.	"Die, Die My Darling" (originally performed by the Misfits)	Danzig	2:29
2.	"Sabbra Cadabra" (live; originally performed by Black Sabbath)	Iommi, Butler, Ward	7:05
3.	"Mercyful Fate" (live; medley of songs originally performed by Mercyful Fate)	Diamond, Shermann	11:11
Total length:			20:45

Mexican version
No.	Title	Writer(s)	Length
1.	"Die, Die My Darling" (originally performed by the Misfits)	Danzig	2:29
Total length:			2:29

=== Personnel ===
Personnel taken from Garage Inc. liner notes and behind the scenes footage.

- James Hetfield – guitar, vocals
- Kirk Hammett – guitar, backing vocals
- Jason Newsted – bass, backing vocals
- Lars Ulrich – drums, backing vocals

=== Charts ===
Chart performance for "Die, Die My Darling" by Metallica
Chart (1999)	Peak position
Australia (ARIA)	82
US Mainstream Rock (Billboard)	26

=== Release history ===
Release history and formats for "Die, Die My Darling" by Metallica
Region	Date	Format	Label
United States	June 7, 1999	Vinyl, CD	Elektra
United Kingdom	June 14, 1999	Vinyl, CD	Elektra
Australia	June 19, 1999	Vinyl, CD	Elektra
