= I Wanna Be a NY Ranger =

Single by the Misfits
- Released: August 1998
- Recorded: May 1998
- Genre: Horror punk
- Length: 1:38
- Label: Non-Homogenized Productions Ltd.
- Songwriter: John Cafiero
- Producer: John Cafiero

Misfits singles chronology
| "Dig Up Her Bones" (1997) | "I Wanna Be a NY Ranger" (1998) | "Scream!" (1999) |

Audio sample
- The marketing department of the New York Rangers objected to the use of the word "danger" in the song's lyrics.: file; help

"I Wanna Be a NY Ranger" is the eighth single by American horror punk band Misfits. It was written by John Cafiero and originally intended to be performed by the Ramones for a promotional campaign for the New York Rangers and Madison Square Garden. However, the Ramones retired in 1996 and Cafiero instead presented the song to the Misfits, who recorded it with Cafiero singing lead vocals. A condensed 30-second version with then-Misfits singer Michale Graves on vocals appeared later that year on the Short Music for Short People compilation.

== Background ==
John Cafiero had originally written "I Wanna Be a NY Ranger" with the intention for it to be recorded by the Ramones as an anthem for the New York Rangers ice hockey team. The song is a punk rock interpolation of the military cadence "Airborne Ranger", inspired by the simplicity of older Ramones songs such as "Beat on the Brat". However, the Ramones retired in 1996 before the project came to fruition. Cafiero had by then made an association with the Misfits, directing the music videos for their songs "American Psycho" and "Dig Up Her Bones" from their 1997 album American Psycho. He presented "I Wanna Be a NY Ranger" to them, and the song was recorded in May 1998 at Proedge, the band's machine shop and rehearsal studio in Vernon Township, New Jersey. It was tracked live to tape with Cafiero providing the vocals in place of regular singer Michale Graves, and was mixed by drummer Dr. Chud at Creepy Attic Studios in Lodi, New Jersey.

Approximately 100 promotional CD copies of the single were produced in connection with a campaign for the Rangers and Madison Square Garden. Beckett Hockey Monthly wrote a review of the song, calling it "classic 'Fits, a minute and a half of hook-laden power punk perfect for revving up a crowd." The song was also the subject of a two-page article in the April 2002 issue of Hit Parader, for which Jerry Only and Cafiero were invited to the Rangers locker room at Madison Square garden for a photo shoot and interview along with members of the team. However, the Rangers' marketing department objected to the use of the word "danger" in the lyrics: "I wanna be a New York Ranger / I wanna live a life of danger". Cafiero and the Misfits refused to alter the lyrics, and as a result ownership of the song was never signed over.

"I Wanna Be a NY Ranger" was released at a time when Michale Graves was rumored to have quit the Misfits to attend hockey camp, having been a longtime fan of the sport and an amateur league player. Although the song had been written several years earlier, Graves' absence from the recording, along with the ironic subject matter of the song, further fueled these rumors. Graves soon dispelled the rumors and returned to the band, who recorded a condensed 30-second version of the song with Graves on vocals, titled "NY Ranger", for the Short Music for Short People compilation album. The full-length version with Cafiero was released two years later on the Misfits compilation album Cuts from the Crypt at the request of the band's label Roadrunner Records.

== Track listing ==
| No. | Title | Writer(s) | Length |
|---|---|---|---|
| 1. | "I Wanna Be a NY Ranger" | John Cafiero | 1:38 |
| Total length: | | | 1:38 |

== Personnel ==
=== Band ===
- Doyle Wolfgang von Frankenstein – guitar
- Jerry Only – bass guitar
- Dr. Chud – drums

=== Additional musicians ===
- John Cafiero – vocals
