= Beware (EP) =

EP by the Misfits
- Released: January 1980
- Recorded: January 1978, January and September 1979
- Genre: Horror punk
- Length: 14:20
- Label: Plan 9

Misfits chronology
Beware (1980)	3 Hits from Hell (1981)

Professional ratings
Review scores
Source	Rating
Allmusic	2/5 stars
Album of the Year	4/10 stars

Beware is the fifth release by the American punk rock band Misfits. First issued in January 1980, this EP combined the Misfits' previously released singles "Bullet" and "Horror Business", and was originally intended as a recording that the Misfits could bring with them on their tour of the United Kingdom with the British punk rock group the Damned in late 1979. Along with songs from "Bullet" and "Horror Business", Beware also includes the track "Last Caress", which had never been released previously.

== Background ==
In November 1979, the Misfits flew to the United Kingdom for a six-date tour with the Damned. The Damned, having scheduled a different opening act for their tour, were not expecting their arrival, but the Misfits were added to the bill nonetheless. After not receiving any payment for performing, the Misfits soon cancelled their remaining appearances on the tour. This was followed by the arrest of Misfits vocalist Glenn Danzig and then-Misfits guitarist Bobby Steele, who had been involved in a fight with a group of skinheads at the Rainbow Theatre in London on December 2, 1979. Danzig and Steele spent two nights in jail in Brixton, England, which inspired them to create the song "London Dungeon".

Then-Misfits drummer Joey Image returned to the United States by himself on December 15, effectively quitting the band. On December 18, the other members of the group flew back to their home state of New Jersey, where they produced Beware. The title of the EP was derived from a series of road signs that the Misfits had come across while in London, which read "Beware Bollards". The band, unfamiliar with the term "bollard", initially thought that it might refer to a cryptid such as their own Jersey Devil. Originally planned as a record that the Misfits could bring with them on their tour with the Damned (they were not able to do so, as the cover artwork had not been completed in time), Beware combined songs from the Misfits' previously issued singles "Bullet" and "Horror Business", except the latter's track "Children in Heat" was replaced by the song "Last Caress", which had never been released prior to Beware.

Beware was the Misfits' only original UK release, and was issued in the UK by Armageddon/Spartan Records

== Track listing ==
All tracks are written by Glenn Danzig.

Side A
No.	Title	Length
1.	"We Are 138"	1:40
2.	"Bullet"	1:37
3.	"Hollywood Babylon"	2:17
4.	"Attitude"	1:28

Side B
No.	Title	Length
1.	"Horror Business"	2:42
2.	"Teenagers from Mars"	2:41
3.	"Last Caress"	1:55
Total length:		14:20

== Personnel ==
=== Band ===
- Glenn Danzig – vocals, guitar
- Jerry Only – bass, background vocals
- Franché Coma – guitar, background vocals (1978 session only)
- Mr. Jim – drums (1978 session only)
- Bobby Steele – guitar, background vocals (1979 session only)
- Joey Image – drums (1979 session only)

=== Production ===
- Dave Achelis – engineer
