= Jim Catania =

American drummer (born 1954)

Jim Catania (born January 5, 1954), commonly known as Mr. Jim, is an American musician, who replaced drummer Manny Martínez in the Misfits in the fall of 1977 and remained in the band until November 1978. Catania had been in an earlier band called Koodot And Boojang with Glenn Danzig. Mr. Jim is featured on the same songs as Franché Coma. Jim left the band soon after Franché and returned to his other band Continental Crawler. He later played for the Adults and Aces and Eights. Both Jim and Manny were from Lodi, New Jersey and graduated from Lodi High School in 1971. After leaving Lodi, Jim moved to Hawthorne, New Jersey with his wife. Mr. Jim and his wife later moved to Hoboken, New Jersey. He opened his own music and DVD store called Mr. Jim's House of Video in Belleville, New Jersey in December 2008.

As for his playing style, he is known for his frantic 4/4 rock beats, ghoulish cymbals and extremely fast footwork on the bass drum and 16th-note precision on the hi-hat.

As of August 2010, Mr. Jim was playing in the Exstatics with Paul of the Living Dead, formerly of the Undead and the Bad Whoremoans. Jim Catania also joined the Von Frankensteins according to an article from Blabbermouth.net. Mr. Jim's latest projects include the instrumental surf album entitled "Monkey with a Gun" and a currently untitled punk rock album. In August 2012 he recorded a Misfits cover of "Hollywood Babylon" with Robby Bloodshed. Jim most recently recorded drums for the single "Red Ice" with Robby Bloodshed for the full length Running Out Of Time.

== Discography with The Misfits ==
- Bullet (1978) - Single
- Beware (1980) - EP
- Legacy of Brutality (1985) - Compilation
- Collection I (1986) - Compilation
- Collection II (1996) - Compilation
- The Misfits (1996) - Box set
- Static Age (1997) - Album

== Discography with Continental Crawler ==
- Promotional Pollution (1979) - EP
- "The Anthology 1977-79: Cars, Cards And Questionable Women" (2008) - CD
