= Horror Business =

Single by the Misfits
- Released: June 26, 1979
- Recorded: January 1979
- Studio: C.I., New York City
- Genre: Horror punk
- Length: 7:37
- Label: Plan 9
- Songwriter: Glenn Danzig

Misfits singles chronology
"Bullet" (1978)	"Horror Business" (1979)	"Night of the Living Dead" (1979)

Audio sample
- "Horror Business": file; help

"Horror Business" is the third single released by the American horror punk band Misfits. It was released on June 26, 1979, through vocalist Glenn Danzig's own label, Plan 9 Records, and is commonly said to have been inspired by the unsolved murder of Nancy Spungen. The B-side of the single features the songs "Teenagers from Mars" and "Children in Heat".

The single's cover artwork features the titular character from the 1946 film serial The Crimson Ghost. The skeletal figure became a mascot for the band, and its skull image would serve as the Misfits' logo for the rest of their career.

== Background and recording ==
On October 12, 1978, the body of Nancy Spungen was discovered in the bathroom of her room at the Hotel Chelsea in Manhattan, New York City. Spungen had been living at the hotel with her boyfriend, Sex Pistols bassist Sid Vicious. Her body was found with a fatal stab wound in her abdomen, and Vicious purportedly owned the knife that made the wound. Vicious was arrested and charged with second degree murder, and after pleading not guilty he was released on bail, awaiting trial. On the evening of February 1, 1979, a small group of Vicious's friends, including Misfits bassist Jerry Only, gathered to celebrate Vicious having made bail at his new girlfriend Michelle Robinson's Greenwich Village apartment. Vicious had undergone a detoxification program during his time in jail at Rikers Island, but at the dinner gathering, Vicious had English photographer Peter "Kodick" Gravelle deliver him heroin. Vicious died of an overdose at some point during the night, and was discovered by his mother, Anne Beverley, and Robinson the following morning.

Prior to Vicious's death, the Misfits were rumored to potentially back Vicious on his proposed debut solo album. After learning of his death, Only helped Beverley collect Vicious's possessions, and invited her to attend a Misfits recording session. "Horror Business", "Teenagers from Mars", and "Children in Heat" were recorded from January 26 to February 5, 1979, at C.I. Studios in New York, where the band had recorded their proposed debut album Static Age a year prior. Beverley attended at least one of the sessions. Writer and vocalist Glenn Danzig insisted that the band record as many tracks as possible during their allotted time in the studio in an effort to save money.

The title track, "Horror Business", contains lyrics such as "You don't go in the bathroom with me" and "I'll put a knife right in you". Because of such lyrics, along with the connections between the Misfits and Vicious, the song is commonly said to have been based on the unsolved murder of Spungen. However, the song's lyrics have also been noted as possible references to the 1960 film Psycho, which features a scene involving a character being stabbed to death in a bathroom. The line "Psycho '78", which also appears in the song, has been interpreted as transposing the year in which the film was released (as well as when the film's narrative takes place) to the year that the song was recorded. The line "driving late at night" may also be a reference to Psycho, in which Janet Leigh's character spends a long portion of the film's first act driving through the night before ultimately ending up at the Bates Motel.

== Release ==
The songs "Horror Business" and "Teenagers from Mars" were considered for inclusion in a 1979 12-inch record which would have also featured the song "Who Killed Marilyn?" An acetate disc of this proposed release was pressed, but completing a run of 12-inch records for the release was deemed to be too expensive, and so the release was scrapped.

The first pressing of the "Horror Business" single, issued by Danzig's own label Plan 9 Records on June 26, 1979, consisted of 25 sleeveless black 7-inch vinyl copies. The second pressing, from August 1979, consisted of 2,000 copies on yellow vinyl. Due to a pressing error, approximately 20 copies had the track "Horror Business" on both sides, rather than "Horror Business" on the A-side and "Teenagers from Mars" and "Children in Heat" on the B-side. Many copies contained an insert with a fabricated story claiming that the band had recorded the single in an abandoned haunted house in New Jersey, and that, when later mixing the tapes at a recording studio in New York City, they heard strange voices and noises in the background of the recordings. According to a 1993 interview with Jerry Only:

What happened was, there was a weird sound on there, and we didn't know where the hell it came from. So we said, "What are we gonna do? Are we gonna remix it?" I said, "Well, I don't got no more money. This is it. You gotta like what you got." We thought about it, and we thought, we don't want everybody to think we're a bunch of jerks. So I think I mentioned it, "Let's just say it was recorded in a haunted house. Everybody'll love that!"

The songs "Horror Business", "Teenagers from Mars", and "Children in Heat" have been re-released multiple times since the single was first issued. In 1980, the songs were included on the Misfits' EP Beware. In 1986, "Horror Business" and "Teenagers from Mars" were included as tracks on the compilation album Misfits, also known as Collection I. A live version of "Horror Business" was included on the EP and album Evilive, released in 1982 and 1987, respectively. "Children in Heat" was re-issued in 1995 on the compilation album Collection II. These releases were all included in the 1996 boxed set The Misfits. "Teenagers from Mars" was also included on the album Static Age, which was part of the boxed set and which received a standalone release in 1997.

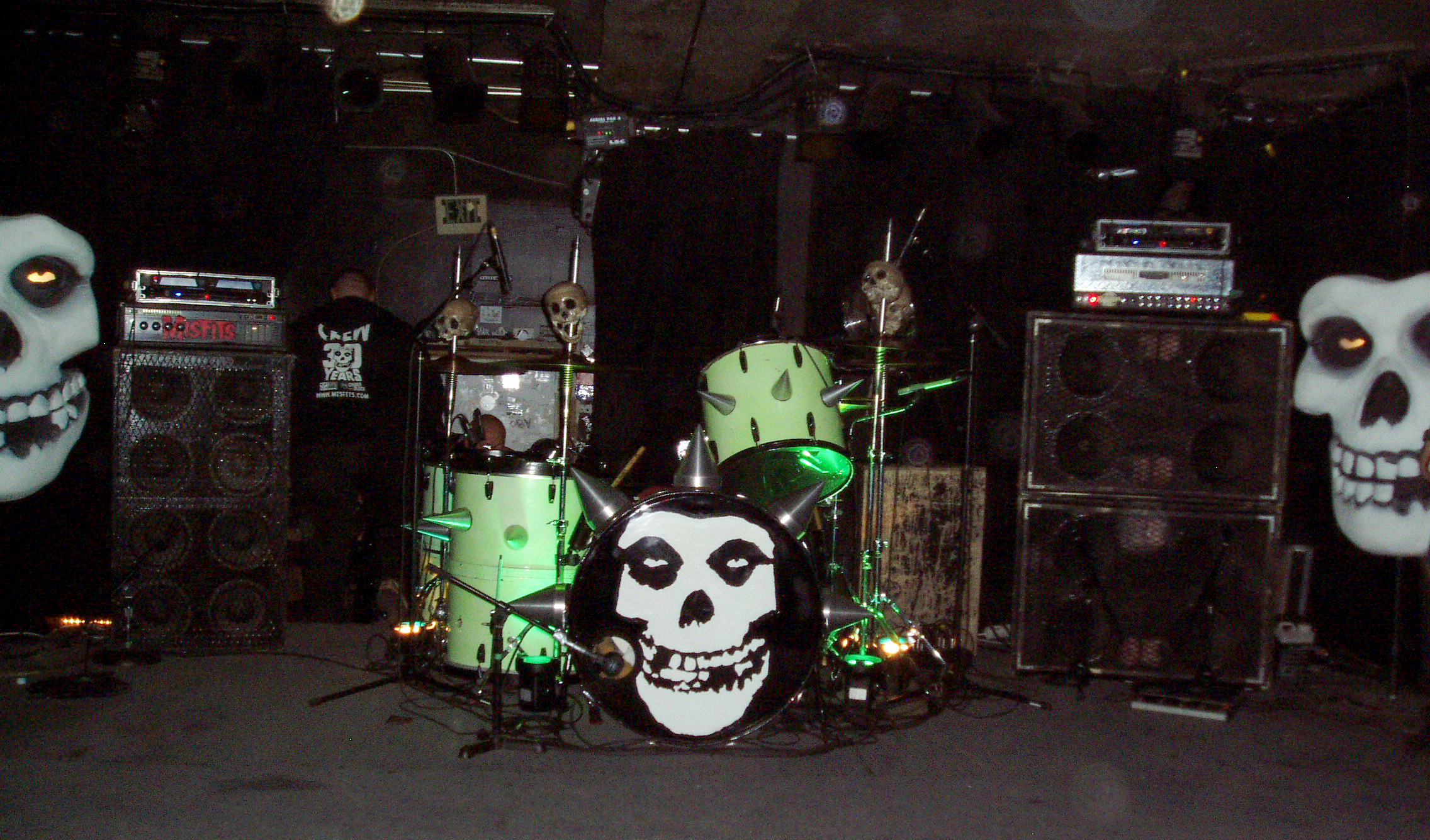
The image of the Crimson Ghost featured on the single's front cover would become an iconic mascot and logo for the band.

=== Cover artwork ===
The single's cover artwork features an image of the eponymous character from the 1946 film serial The Crimson Ghost. The Misfits had first made use of the character's likeness in a flyer promoting one of their gigs on March 28, 1979 at Max's Kansas City, after Danzig and Only came across a picture of the Crimson Ghost while searching for images to silkscreen on T-shirts.

The "Horror Business" single marks the first time that the Misfits had incorporated the character's likeness into the cover artwork of one of their releases, and the character's skull-like visage would become a recognizable mascot and logo for the band throughout their career. The back cover of the single features black-and-white portraits of the individual band members, along with a rendering of Lon Chaney as the Phantom from the 1925 film The Phantom of the Opera.

== Track listing ==
All tracks are written by Glenn Danzig.

Side A
No.	Title	Length
1.	"Horror Business"	2:46

Side B
No.	Title	Length
1.	"Teenagers From Mars"	2:43
2.	"Children In Heat"	2:08
Total length:		7:37

== Critical reception ==
"The first [Misfits] singles just knocked me out. They were so interesting and mysterious. I had no idea what to make of them ... [Danzig] was deeply talented, a genius as a kid. His lyrics puzzled me. 'Paint my mirrors black for you'—what the fuck does that mean?"

— Ian MacKaye of Minor Threat and Fugazi on the Misfits' early singles and the lyrics of "Horror Business".

In his book This Music Leaves Stains: The Complete Story of the Misfits, author James Greene Jr. writes of the single as a whole: "While more muddled production-wise than 'Bullet', 'Horror Business' is just as arresting as its predecessor [...] 'Horror Business' was greeted by the growing Misfits fan base as an instant classic." He goes on to note that the title track "offers a bluesy feel at times, almost as if nothing more is at stake than the melody."

Dan Ozzi of Diffuser.fm ranked "Horror Business" #7 on his list of the 10 best Misfits songs, and noted the "vague" nature of the track's lyrics. Eduardo Rivadavia of Ultimate Classic Rock also ranked the song #7 on his list of the top 10 Misfits songs, comparing the track's "knuckle-scraping riffs" and Danzig's "distinctively punchy pronunciation" to the music of the Ramones. Aaron Lariviere of Stereogum ranked the track #9 on his list of the best Misfits songs, calling it an example of a Misfits song with lyrics that are "just awesome".

== Personnel ==
The Misfits

- Glenn Danzig – vocals
- Bobby Steele – guitar
- Jerry Only – bass guitar
- Joey Image – drums

Production

- Dave Achelis – producer
- Rich Flores – mastering

== See also ==
- Misfits discography
