= Earth A.D./Wolfs Blood =

Studio album by Misfits
- Released: December 1983
- Recorded: October 1982, June–July 1983
- Studios: Unicorn Studio, Mix-O-Lydian, Fox Studio
- Genres: Hardcore punk; horror punk
- Length: 14:36
- Label: Plan 9
- Producer: The Misfits And Spot

Misfits chronology
Evilive (1982)	Earth A.D./Wolfs Blood (1983)	Legacy of Brutality (1985)

Singles from Earth A.D./Wolfs Blood
- 1. "Die, Die My Darling" Released: May 1984

Professional ratings
Review scores
Source	Rating
AllMusic	4.5/5 stars
Spin Alternative Record Guide	4/10

Earth A.D./Wolfs Blood is the second studio album to be released by American punk rock band Misfits. It is the last album the group recorded with founding member Glenn Danzig on vocals, who issued the vinyl record on his Plan 9 label in December 1983, two months after he played his last concert with the band. Though the original album runs under 15 minutes in length, it is listed as an LP.

The original nine-song album was later issued with the three tracks from the band's 1984 single incorporated into the track listing: "Die, Die My Darling", "Mommy, Can I Go Out and Kill Tonight?" and "We Bite".

Some versions of the album containing these bonus tracks are listed with the title Earth A.D./Die, Die, My Darling.

Glenn Danzig has said that the tracks "Bloodfeast" and "Death Comes Ripping" were originally intended for release on the first album by his subsequent band, Samhain, but were added to what would be Misfits final record in a last-ditch effort to save the band.

== Tributes ==
Metallica covered "Die, Die My Darling" for their 1998 cover album Garage Inc., as well as "Green Hell", which they originally covered for their 1987 album, The $5.98 E.P. - Garage Days Re-Revisited, as part of a medley with "Last Caress". British extreme metal band Cradle of Filth covered "Death Comes Ripping" for their 1999 release From the Cradle to Enslave. Swedish black metal band Marduk did a cover of "Earth A.D." on their EP Obedience.

In July 2015, the Jerry Only-led incarnation of the Misfits played the album in its entirety at the annual This is Hardcore festival.

On August 1, 2018, action figure company Super7 released an Earth A.D.-themed "Fiend" figure as part of their ReAction Misfits figure collection.

== Track listing ==
=== Original release ===
All tracks are written by Glenn Danzig.

Side A: Earth A.D.
No.	Title	Length
1.	"Earth A.D."	2:09
2.	"Queen Wasp"	1:32
3.	"Devilock"	1:26
4.	"Death Comes Ripping"	1:53
5.	"Green Hell"	1:53

Side B: Wolfs Blood
No.	Title	Length
6.	"Wolfs Blood"	1:13
7.	"Demonomania"	0:45
8.	"Bloodfeast"	2:29
9.	"Hellhound"	1:16
Total length:		14:36

=== CD & cassette version ===
No.	Title	Length
1.	"Earth A.D."	2:09
2.	"Queen Wasp"	1:32
3.	"Devilock"	1:26
4.	"Death Comes Ripping"	1:53
5.	"Green Hell"	1:53
6.	"Mommy, Can I Go Out and Kill Tonight?"	2:03
7.	"Wolfs Blood"	1:13
8.	"Demonomania"	0:45
9.	"Bloodfeast"	2:29
10.	"Hellhound"	1:16
11.	"Die, Die My Darling"	3:11
12.	"We Bite"	1:15
Total length:		21:11

== Personnel ==
- Glenn Danzig – vocals
- Doyle – guitars
- Jerry Only – bass
- Robo – drums
- Arthur Googy – drums on "Die, Die My Darling"
- Spot – producer
