= Franché Coma =

American musician

Franché Coma (born Frank Licata; August 17, 1957), is an American musician. He is one of the original guitarists of the Misfits, and the first to record in studio with them. Coma joined The Misfits in the fall of 1977 as the band's first guitarist eight months after singer Glenn Danzig, bassist Jerry Only, and drummer Manny Martinez formed the band. All of his recordings were recorded on the famous Static Age sessions in February 1978 at Mercury Records CI recording studio in NYC. Coma left The Misfits in the fall of 1978 and went on to play for the band Active Ingredients with his longtime friend Ashley Morance.

== Equipment ==
Coma used a Gibson 1976 reissue Explorer with a DiMarzio Super Distortion humbucker pickup, an Electro-Harmonix Big Muff fuzz, an Ampeg V-4 amplifier head and V-2 cabinet, and Fender .008 gauge strings.
