= Psycho in the Wax Museum =

EP by Misfits
- Released: 2006
- Recorded: December 1996–January 1997
- Genres: Punk rock, horror punk
- Length: 5:35
- Label: Misfits
- Producer: Daniel Rey

Misfits chronology
| Project 1950 (2003) | Psycho in the Wax Museum (2006) | The Devil's Rain (2011) |

Professional ratings
Review scores
| Source | Rating |
|---|---|
| Prindle Record Reviews | 1/10 stars |

Psycho in the Wax Museum is an EP by the American punk rock band Misfits. It features two songs that were previously unreleased and were recorded during the American Psycho sessions. The versions included are instrumental, as it has been reported that the vocals were never recorded ("Angel Baby" has previously been performed live at soundcheck with vocals by Michale Graves). The single was only available via an offer from Misfits Records where proofs of purchase had to be sent in from Osaka Popstar's Osaka Popstar and the American Legends of Punk, Balzac's Beyond the Darkness and the Misfits' Project 1950.

The cover art is by Butch Lukic and features the Misfits' mascot Crimson Ghost. The vinyl itself features an etched pattern of Fiend Skulls in the area that doesn't feature music. In 2011, Michale Graves recorded new vocals for the track "Angel Baby", renaming it "We Are the Wicked".

== Track listing ==
1. "Angel Baby" - 3:02
2. "Death of the Fallen Angel" - 2:33

== Personnel ==
- Jerry Only – bass
- Doyle Wolfgang Von Frankenstein – guitar
- Dr. Chud – drums
