= The Devil's Rain (album) =

- Album cover art by Arthur Suydam

Studio album by the Misfits
- Released: October 4, 2011
- Genres: Heavy metal; horror punk
- Length: 50:22
- Label: Misfits Records
- Producers: Ed Stasium, John Cafiero

Misfits chronology
Psycho in the Wax Museum (2006)	The Devil's Rain (2011)	Dead Alive! (2013)

Singles from The Devil's Rain
- 1. "Land of the Dead" Released: October 27, 2009; 2. "Twilight of the Dead" Released: October 4, 2011

The Devil's Rain is the seventh studio album by horror punk band Misfits, released October 4, 2011, through the label that the Misfits own, Misfits Records. It is the band's first album in eight years, following 2003's covers record Project 1950, and the first of original material since 1999's Famous Monsters. It is also the only release by the band's lineup of Jerry Only, Dez Cadena, and Eric "Chupacabra" Arce. The Devil's Rain was produced by Ed Stasium, who previously worked with the band on Famous Monsters.

The album is titled after the 1975 horror film of the same name and features cover artwork by Arthur Suydam, who previously did the cover of the band's 2009 single "Land of the Dead". Both songs from that single—"Land of the Dead" and "Twilight of the Dead"—were re-recorded for The Devil's Rain, and "Twilight of the Dead" was released as the album's lead single, with "Land of the Dead" as the b-side. The Misfits supported the album with tours of the United States and Australia from September to December 2011.

== Background ==
Like previous Misfits albums, The Devil's Rain includes references and homages to many past works of horror and science fiction. The title track is based on the 1975 film The Devil's Rain, while other tracks reference the films The Ghost of Frankenstein (1942), The Curse of the Mummy's Tomb (1964), The Black Hole (1979), and Land of the Dead (2005; Twilight of the Dead was this film's working title). "Dark Shadows" is based on the gothic soap opera of the same title that aired from 1966 to 1971, while "Monkey's Paw" is based on the 1902 short story and its various adaptations. "Vivid Red" is inspired by the opening scene of Dracula (1992), which depicts Vlad the Impaler in battle.

== Reception ==
Professional ratings
Aggregate scores
Source	Rating
Metacritic	46/100
Review scores
Source	Rating
AllMusic	2/5 stars
Alternative Press	2/5 stars
The Boston Phoenix	2/4 stars
Consequence of Sound	3/5 stars
Kerrang!	2/5 stars
Pitchfork	3.9/10
Q	2/5 stars
Slant Magazine	2/5 stars
Tiny Mix Tapes	2.5/5 stars
Uncut	6/10

The Devil's Rain sold 6,000 copies in its first week of release and debuted at number 70 on the Billboard 200, making it the band's highest-charting album. It received a mixed critical response: at Metacritic, the album has an average score of 46 out of 100 based on 11 reviews, indicating "mixed or average reviews". Keith Carman of Alternative Press commented that "The sinewy guitar progressions and coupling of cryptic lyrics with floating melodies is admirable and occasionally infectious" and remarked that the production values mimicked those of the band's 1990s albums American Psycho and Famous Monsters, giving the tracks "brightness and color". Nevertheless, he called the album "far from a classic release", complaining that "an overabundance of half-time pacing has all but eliminated the hard, aggressive edge the Misfits were once revered for" and concluding that "The Devil's Rain yields little more than incredible frustration, a mixed bag with some great tunes worthy of inclusion in the Misfits' second generation yet sorely lacking in primeval vitality." David Buchanan of Consequence of Sound described it as "less than amicable and lacking a certain sense of evil pre-Michale Graves, though The Devil's Rain is definitely still in a campy, late-Misfits state of mind." He remarked that "shorter moments in 'The Black Hole' and the screamingly fast beginning pace of 'Jack the Ripper' remind listeners who exactly the Misfits used to be", but noted that as the album plays on, "semblances of the Buddy Holly-era musical muses and B movie inspirations that mutated into early Misfits material fall completely off the radar", saying that some of the album's updated elements might confuse the band's longtime fans. He concluded that "The Devil's Rain feels like a 50/50 shot-in-the-dark project, starting in a place unsure of its own existence and finishing strong with the uncompromising 'Death Ray'".

Matthew Cole of Slant Magazine was critical of the album's musical direction: "As was the case when Jerry Only resurrected the band in the 1990s, the Misfits have incorporated a dose of not-especially-heavy metal into their sound; on a scale of Winger to Slayer, this rocks at about Scorpions." He also criticized the lyrical content: "The lyrics are as absurd as ever: Think of something that scared the crap out of you when you were seven, and it's probably mentioned in 'Ghost of Frankenstein', 'Curse of the Mummy's Hand', or 'Cold in Hell' ... The Devil's Rain is the work of a band that aspires to give the genre little more than its answer to the 'Monster Mash'." Joe Hemmerling of Tiny Mix Tapes also remarked on the musical direction of the album, saying that it "continues to straddle the line between punk and metal, combining muscular, thrashy riffs with punk punchiness and the Misfits' own idiosyncratic penchant for melody. The best songs on the album still tend to be the ones that shoehorn in those famous 'whoa-oh-ohs' wherever they can, with the under-two-minute 'Black Hole' being an obvious standout. For the most part, though, those big, sloppy harmonies seem less prominent, often relegated to the background." He singled out "Death Ray", "Sleepwalkin'", and "Where Do They Go?" as standout tracks, calling the latter "the undisputed masterpiece of this album ... The song reframes a story of real-life violence, the Las muertas de Juarez, as a 50s sock-hop torch song, complete with handclaps and female backup singers. It's a spot-on appropriation of golden age rock 'n' roll songwriting conventions on a topic that's in such deliciously poor taste that it recalls similar forays such as Famous Monsters' 'Saturday Night', or the classic lineup's 'American Nightmare'." He concluded that "it's not that The Devil's Rain is a bad album, but it's by far the weakest link in the band's catalog, and coming at a time when faith in the group is at an all-time low."

Jerry Only's vocals received specific comments from several reviewers. Hemmerling remarked "The vocals on the album are a weak point in general. Michale Graves caught a lot of shit for not being Glenn Danzig, but spinning this record helps you appreciate just how significant his contribution was to the group. Only's cartoony, stentorian bark that felt so at home on the excellent Project 1950 falls flat here and lacks the dynamism to invest the listener in the emotional core of these kitschy, monster-movie melodramas." Allmusic's Jason Lymangrover agreed, saying "even the fans who embraced Michale Graves as a replacement vocalist might have a hard time with the bassist's deadpan, articulate crooning. He may be a devil-locked punk icon, but he sounds an awful lot like Pat Boone, and his presence behind the microphone is just as intimidating." Carman was more blunt: "Point blank: Only is a crooner; a throaty singer worthy of Rat Pack or Damned tribute albums. He's nowhere near maintaining the dark grit, ferocious gusto or guttural severity Misfits songs require." John Gentile of Punknews.org was more praising of Only's vocal development from previous releases: "Only has clearly taken time to improve his voice. Where he simply used to shout, his voice has become cleaner and more smooth, at times almost resembling '50s crooners like Dion and Del Shannon, who blended the dying doo-wop with the infant rock and roll." He was more critical of Cadena's singing on "Jack the Ripper" and "Death Ray": "Although it's exciting to hear Cadena take vocals on two tracks, he opts to use his deeper, space roc- influenced howl heard on his DC3 albums in lieu of his skull-cracking bark from [Black Flag's] 'Louie Louie' single."

In a review for The Boston Phoenix, Michael Christopher speculated that the album would be received poorly by those who refuse to recognize the Misfits as legitimate without Glenn Danzig. "The problem is, and has always been, that it just isn't the Misfits without Glenn Danzig at the helm", he elaborated in the Delaware County Daily Times, "[Only] retains the name in rights only, because there is no true legitimacy left within the group, which has featured a revolving door of backup players." "That's a shame, because The Devil's Rain is chock full of good, campy horror business." He gave the album a mixed review in both publications, praising some tracks while criticizing others: "'Unexplained', 'Vivid Red', and 'Sleepwalkin' ' are fun and frightfully ferocious. Other points are stumbles: 'Monkey's Paw' has Only trying pitifully hard to ape the Misfits' 'Last Caress', and tracks like 'Curse of the Mummy's Hand' and 'Ghost of Frankenstein' are too predictable to be more than schlock, though it would be funny—in a good, goofy, send-up sort of way—if it was done under another moniker ... These guys just need another alias." Gentile expressed similar sentiments, complementing Only's bass and Cadena's guitar playing but saying that the group's choice to continue under the Misfits name seemed to limit their choice of subject matter: "while the band has technical chops, it almost seems like they are singing about the occult and undead merely because that's what the Misfits are supposed to do. When original vocalist Glenn Danzig detailed 'the insemination of little girls in the middle of wet dreams', it seemed like that was something he was actually into. Even when second Misfits vocalist, Michael Graves, wailed that he was 'crying on a Saturday night', it seemed he was pulling from true early 20s dejection. But, when Only sings about mummies, or Frankenstein, or even hell, it doesn't seem like that's what he feels is important, but what he is limited to in subject matter, leaving the tunes without any sense of conviction." He did note that "when the band does become most alive is when they play the style of music that excites them", citing Only's doo-wop style in "The Black Hole" as an example. "The Devil's Rain certainly isn't a disgrace", he concluded, "and long-running fans will find at least a few things to enjoy about the album. It's just frustrating that when the band snaps together and plays what they truly want to play, they aren't so much 'the Misfits' as a band containing a hefty amount of punk talent and experience. Instead of leaving the past behind, they seem to cling to it, forever condemning themselves to comparisons of previous incarnations." Lymangrover opined similarly, saying the album "suffers from the fact that the group never tries to expand on the vocabulary established 30 years ago. If Famous Monsters was a step back for the Misfits legacy, this is a bigger step in the wrong direction."

== Track listing ==
All tracks are written by Jerry Only, except where noted.

No.	Title	Writer(s)	Length
1.	"The Devil's Rain"		3:22
2.	"Vivid Red"		1:55
3.	"Land of the Dead"		2:13
4.	"The Black Hole"		1:50
5.	"Twilight of the Dead"		2:33
6.	"Curse of the Mummy's Hand"		3:49
7.	"Cold in Hell"		2:50
8.	"Unexplained"		3:03
9.	"Dark Shadows"		3:40
10.	"Father"		3:39
11.	"Jack the Ripper"	Dez Cadena	3:49
12.	"Monkey's Paw"	Daniel Rey, Only	2:47
13.	"Where Do They Go?"		2:39
14.	"Sleepwalkin'"	Only, Ed Stasium	4:13
15.	"Ghost of Frankenstein"		2:55
16.	"Death Ray"	Cadena	4:58

== Personnel ==
Adapted from the liner notes.

=== Misfits ===
- Jerry Only – lead and backing vocals, bass, keyboards (track 10), additional percussion (tracks 1 and 13), monster growls (tracks 6 and 15), sci-fi sound effects montage (track 16)
- Dez Cadena – guitars, backing vocals, lead vocals (tracks 11 and 16), additional percussion (track 13)
- Eric "Chupacabra" Arce – drums

=== Additional musicians ===
- Ed Stasium – backing vocals, additional guitar (tracks 1, 6, 7, and 13), EBow (tracks 2 and 9), additional percussion (tracks 1–3, 8–10, and 13), keyboards (tracks 8–10 and 14), sci-fi sound effects montage (track 16)
- Karin Ullvin – violin intro (track 15)
- Jerry Caiafa II – backing vocals, additional percussion (track 13), sci-fi sound effects montage (track 16)
- Mike Serino – backing vocals
- Zack Fortune – backing vocals
- Dominick Dolio – backing vocals
- Joanna Powers – backing vocals (track 13)
- Amy Hartman – backing vocals (track 13)
- Eva Marie Powers Caiafa – backing vocals (track 13)

=== Production ===
- Ed Stasium – producer, recording engineer, mix engineer
- John Cafiero – producer (track 9, with Stasium)
- Jerry Caiafa II – assistant recording engineer
- Doug Eagle – assistant recording engineer
- Greg Calbi – mastering

=== Design ===
- Arthur Suydam – artwork
- John Cafiero – art direction, "Dark Shadows" photograph
- Mick Rock – photographs
- Jon Krop – packaging layout

== Charts ==
Chart (2011)	Peak position
Finnish Albums (Suomen virallinen lista)	50
Billboard 200	70
US Independent Albums (Billboard)	12
US Top Rock Albums (Billboard)	18
US Top Hard Rock Albums (Billboard)	6
US Alternative Albums (Billboard)	14
