= Day the Earth Caught Fire =

- Cover of the international version of the single. The Japanese version had the same image but was titled "Don't Open 'Til Doomsday"

Single by the Misfits and Balzac

from the album Project 1950 and The Last Men on Earth
- Released: 2002
- Genre: Horror punk
- Length: 8:26
- Label: Misfits (MIS-01392)
- Songwriters: Hirosuke Nishiyama, Atsushi Nakagawa, Akio Imai, Takayuki Manabe
- Producers: John Cafiero, Jerry Only, Balzac, DIWPhalanx Records

Misfits singles chronology
"Monster Mash" (1999)	"Day the Earth Caught Fire" (2002)	"Land of the Dead" (2009)

Balzac singles chronology
"Don't Open 'Til Doomsday" (2002)

"Day the Earth Caught Fire" is a song by the Japanese horror punk band Balzac from their 1995 album The Last Men on Earth. In 2002 it was covered by the Misfits for a split single celebrating Balzac's signing to the newly formed Misfits Records, with Balzac covering a medley of the Misfits songs "The Haunting" and "Don't Open 'Til Doomsday" from the 1997 album American Psycho. Balzac also filmed a music video for their version. The international version of the single, released on June 18th 2002, was titled "Day the Earth Caught Fire" and had the Misfits as track 1 and Balzac as track 2, while the Japanese release was titled "Don't Open 'Til Doomsday" and had the tracks in reverse order.

The DVD included with the Misfits' Project 1950 album in 2003 included live videos of the Misfits performing "Day the Earth Caught Fire" in New York City with Balzac singer Hirosuke, Balzac performing "The Haunting/Don't Open 'Til Doomsday" in Tokyo with Misfits members Jerry Only and Dez Cadena, and Balzac performing "Day the Earth Caught Fire" in Japan with Jerry Only. It also included Balzac's music videos for "The Haunting/Don't Open 'Til Doomsday" and their own song "Out of the Blue".

== Track listing ==
International edition
No.	Title	Writer(s)	Performer	Length
1.	"Day the Earth Caught Fire" (originally performed by Balzac)	Hirosuke Nishiyama, Atsushi Nakagawa, Akio Imai, Takayuki Manabe	Misfits	3:16
2.	"The Haunting / Don't Open 'Til Doomsday" (originally performed by the Misfits)	Michale Graves, Jerry Only, Doyle Wolfgang von Frankenstein, Dr. Chud	Balzac	5:10
Total length:				8:26

Japanese edition
No.	Title	Writer(s)	Performer	Length
1.	"The Haunting / Don't Open 'Til Doomsday" (originally performed by the Misfits)	Graves, Only, Doyle, Chud	Balzac	5:10
2.	"Day the Earth Caught Fire" (originally performed by Balzac)	Nishiyama, Nakagawa, Imai, Manabe	Misfits	3:16
Total length:				8:26

== Personnel ==
=== Misfits ===
- Jerry Only - bass guitar, vocals
- Dez Cadena - guitar
- Marky Ramone - drums

=== Balzac ===
- Hirosuke - vocals
- Atsushi - guitar
- Akio - bass
- Takayuki - drums

=== Additional performers ===
- John Cafiero - backing vocals on "Day the Earth Caught Fire"

=== Production ===
- Alan Douches - Mixing and mastering of "Day the Earth Caught Fire" at West West Side Music
- Jesse Cannon - Engineering of "Day the Earth Caught Fire"
- Tetsuya Kotani - Engineering and mixing of "The Haunting / Don't Open 'Til Doomsday" at Omega Sound
- Akihiko Takenaka - Mastering of "The Haunting / Don't Open 'Til Doomsday" at Heart Beat
