= Dead Alive! =

Live album by the Misfits
- Released: February 5, 2013
- Genre: Horror punk
- Label: Misfits

Misfits chronology
The Devil's Rain (2011)	Dead Alive! (2013)	Horror Xmas (2013)

Dead Alive! is a live album by the Misfits. It was released on February 5, 2013 by Misfits Records. Album artwork was provided by Jason Edmiston.

== Track listing ==
1. "The Devil's Rain"
2. "Vivid Red"
3. "Land of the Dead"
4. "Curse of the Mummy's Hand"
5. "Cold in Hell"
6. "Dark Shadows"
7. "Death Ray"
8. "Shining"
9. "American Psycho"
10. "Dig Up Her Bones"
11. "Scream!"
12. "Helena"
13. "Science Fiction/Double Feature"
14. "Saturday Night"

== Personnel ==
- Jerry Only - vocals, bass guitar
- Dez Cadena - vocals, guitar
- Eric "Chupacabra" Arce - drums
