= Land of the Dead (Misfits song) =

- The single's cover by Arthur Suydam is a homage to the Living Dead film series.

Single by the Misfits
- A-side: "Land of the Dead"
- B-side: "Twilight of the Dead"
- Released: October 27, 2009
- Recorded: 2009
- Genre: Horror punk
- Length: 4:59
- Label: Misfits
- Songwriter: Jerry Only
- Producer: The Misfits

Misfits singles chronology
"Day the Earth Caught Fire" (2002)	"Land of the Dead" (2009)	"Twilight of the Dead" (2011)

"Land of the Dead" is a single by the horror punk band the Misfits, released October 27, 2009 through Misfits Records. It is the first release of new studio material from the band since the 2003 cover album Project 1950, and their first release of new, original material since 1999's Famous Monsters. It is also the only release by the band's 2005–2010 lineup of Jerry Only, Dez Cadena, and Robo.

The single's cover artwork, by Marvel Zombies artist Arthur Suydam, is based on the band's "Crimson Ghost" skull logo. Both the cover art and the single's two songs, "Land of the Dead" and "Twilight of the Dead", are a homage to director George A. Romero's Living Dead series of zombie films. "Land of the Dead" is named after Romero's 2005 film of the same name, for which Twilight of the Dead was a working title. "Land of the Dead" and "Twilight of the Dead" are the third and fourth Misfits songs to be titled after Romero's Living Dead films. Previous Misfits lineups had recorded "Night of the Living Dead" (1979), titled after the 1969 film, and "Day of the Dead" (on the 1997 album American Psycho), titled after the 1985 film.

The first pressing of the single, consisting of 1,000 copies on 12-inch translucent red vinyl, was made available exclusively through the band's website and online store. A second pressing of 1,000 on translucent orange vinyl was available exclusively at the band's performances beginning October 30, 2009. The single was released for download through iTunes and other digital music retailers beginning October 27, 2009. It had its radio airplay premiere the same day on Sirius XM Radio's "Faction" channel.

The band re-recorded both songs for their 2011 album The Devil's Rain, with the new versions also being released on the "Twilight of the Dead" single.

== Track listing ==
All tracks are written by Jerry Only.

Side A
No.	Title	Length
1.	"Land of the Dead"	2:14

Side B
No.	Title	Length
1.	"Twilight of the Dead"	2:45
Total length:		4:59

== Personnel ==
Band

- Jerry Only – bass guitar, lead vocals
- Dez Cadena – guitar
- Robo – drums

Artwork

- Arthur Suydam – cover artwork
