= Dez Cadena =

American punk rock singer and guitarist

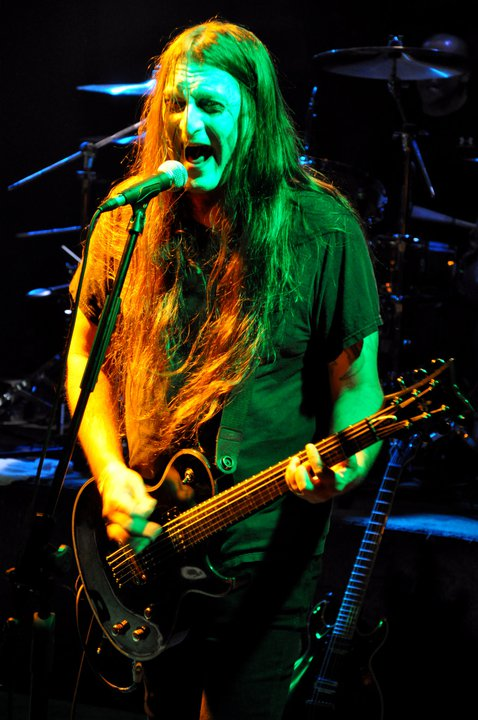
- Cadena with Misfits in 2011

Background information
- Born: June 2, 1961 (age 65); Newark, New Jersey, U.S.
- Genres: Punk rock, horror punk, hardcore punk
- Occupations: Musician, singer, songwriter
- Instruments: Vocals, guitar
- Years active: 1980–present
- Labels: SST, Misfits

Dez Paul Cadena (born June 2, 1961) is an American punk rock singer and guitarist. He was the third vocalist and later rhythm guitarist for hardcore punk band Black Flag from 1980 to 1983. Cadena played guitar with Misfits from 2001 to 2015, initially joining the band alongside Doyle, Jerry Only, and Robo for their 25th Anniversary Tour.

== Early life ==
Born in Newark, New Jersey, his father, Ozzie Cadena, was a well-known A&R man in the music industry, and the co-founder of iconic jazz label Savoy Records.

At age thirteen, Cadena moved to Hermosa Beach, California. While tending a yard sale at his father's house, Cadena met Ron Reyes and the two became friends. Reyes introduced Cadena to the local punk scene and they both started watching the early incarnation of Black Flag when they were still going by the name Panic. Soon Reyes replaced Keith Morris as vocalist of the band.

== Career ==
=== Early career ===
Cadena joined Black Flag in 1980, replacing singer Ron Reyes. During the first year of touring with the band, his hoarse voice became a recognizable and often imitated style of singing in hardcore punk. Eventually, and due in part to straining his voice, Cadena decided he wanted to play guitar. Henry Rollins joined as vocalist, and for a period, Cadena played rhythm guitar alongside founder Greg Ginn, including on the seminal 1981 album Damaged.

Eventually, Cadena wanted to explore other forms of music so he left Black Flag and started DC3.

Before, during and after his stint in Black Flag, Cadena was a member of Redd Kross, Twisted Roots, and Ella and the Blacks, a band which he co-founded. He also made a guest appearance on Hüsker Dü's 1984 double album, Zen Arcade.

=== 1990s ===
During the mid-1990s, Cadena teamed up with George Hurley and Tom Troccoli to form Vida. Originally VIDA was formed with former Saccharine Trust drummer Tony Cicero. The original line-up recording of the Minutemen tune Reserved for 99' can be found on the cover compilation "Our Band Could Be Your Life". Their self-titled album was released by Blue Man from Uranus Records. The band has since dissolved. He also played with raucous Hermosa Beach bar band The Jim Mellon Quartet, as well as Steve Reed and Dave Markey in Carnage Asada. Cadena played guitar and sang lead vocals for the super-group Chop on their only single, which consisted of Blue Öyster Cult covers. The group also included Mike Watt, Dave Markey, Dave Peterson, and Dave Travis.

In around 1999, Cadena toured as part of ex-Guns N' Roses bassist Duff McKagan's solo band to promote McKagan's latest album Beautiful Disease which was never actually released because of the merger between Universal and PolyGram, but promoted on tour.

=== Misfits ===
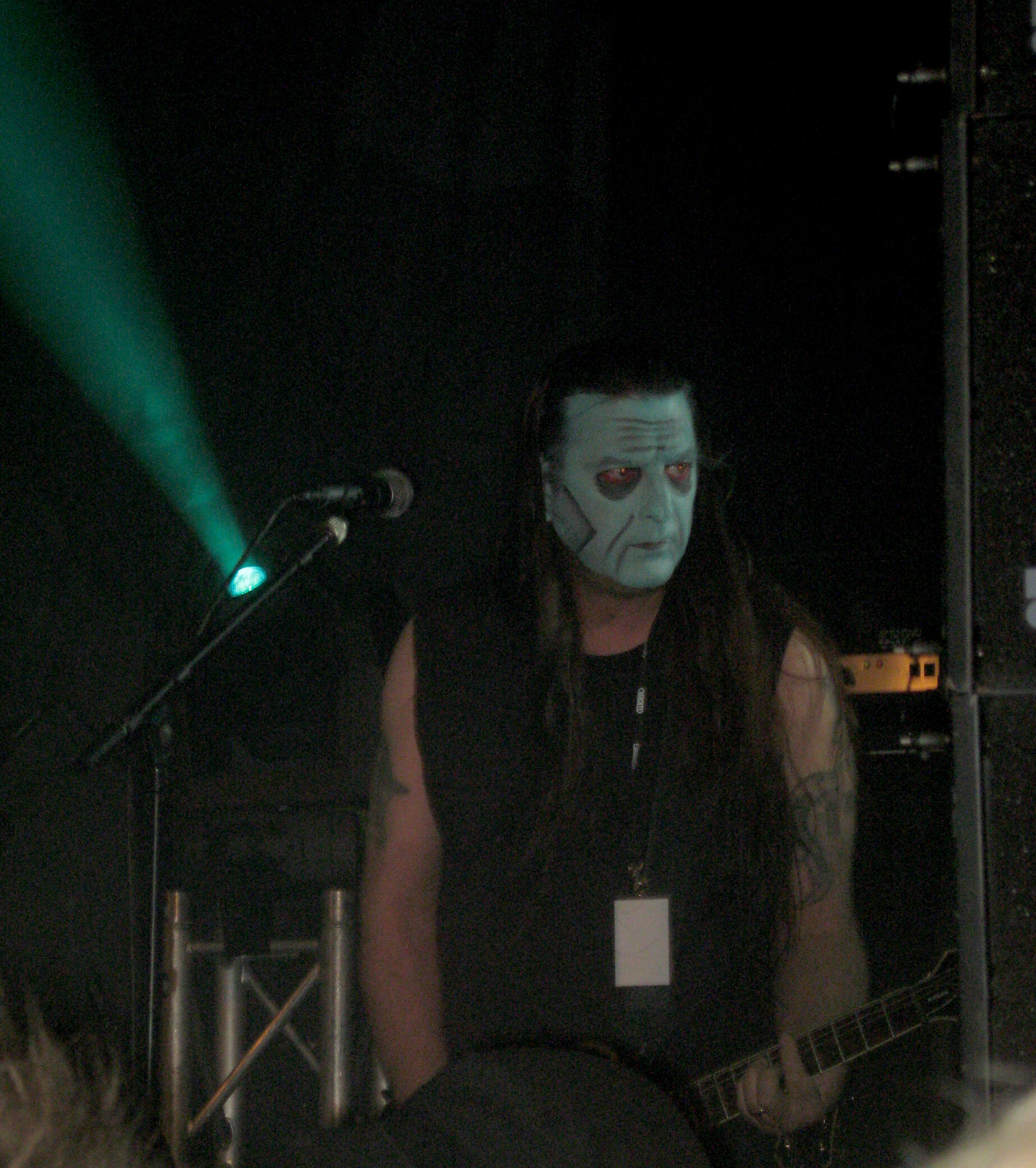
Cadena performing with the Misfits in 2009

Cadena first played with Misfits on the band's 25th anniversary tour in 2001, initially joining the band alongside Doyle, Jerry Only and ROBO, following the departure of Michale Graves and Dr. Chud who had left the band to form the short-lived Graves. Only took over singing duties although Michale Graves filled in as a guest for a number of shows alongside future Blitzkrieg bandmate Marky Ramone. Robo returned to the band for the first time since the 1980s having played on the band's classic Earth A.D./Wolfsblood album alongside Jerry and Doyle. Cadena had also played with Robo in Black Flag in the early 1980s. This line-up featured one bonus track only on the Cuts From The Crypt compilation. They split up when Doyle left the band after a failed reunion with Glenn Danzig, later joining Danzig instead. Robo and Marky Ramone both handled drum duties for the band on this tour before Robo left once again.

In 2003, Only pieced together a line-up for the Project 1950 cover album which featured himself, Cadena and Marky Ramone. The band toured to support the album and released one single, once again a cover for "The Day The Earth Caught Fire" by Japan's Balzac. Cadena also played lead guitar for punk rock supergroup Osaka Popstar during this period, along with Jerry Only, Marky Ramone, John Cafiero and Ivan Julian. The band has released one album to date, Osaka Popstar and the American Legends of Punk, in 2006. In 2005 and 2006, Cadena was also a member of the raucous Hermosa Beach bar band, The Jim Mellon Quartet.

Around 2006, Marky left Misfits and was replaced by Robo for the 30th Anniversary Tour. In 2007 Only announced that this line-up would release a new album. This was delayed due to the bands' relentless touring. Eventually in 2009 the band released a new single "Land of the Dead" before once again ejecting Robo from the band due to constant visa problems. Cadena was also a judge for the 8th annual Independent Music Awards to support independent artists during this time.

The band then hired Murphy's Law drummer Eric Arce who had filled in for the band on various shows over the past ten years. The band was then in the studio to finally record their new album The Devil's Rain in 2011, with Cadena writing and singing a number of songs. The album was met with mixed reviews despite debuting at number 70 on the Billboard 200. The band toured worldwide in support of the album following its release.

Between Misfits tours, Cadena plays in the NY/NJ area as "Dez Cadena + The Broken Down Bitches". He is currently working on a solo record featuring guest musicians and friends.

Cadena also contributed vocals to the song "From The Shadows" from Recognise, the debut album from UK band JD & the FDCs, which was released in July 2012. Former WWE Women's Champion Amy Dumas also appears on the track. A video, featuring Cadena, was released on March 4, 2013.

=== Post-Misfits ===
On Monday June 22, 2015, Cadena announced he was no longer in Misfits. In August 2015, it was revealed he was battling cancer.

On October 25, 2015, Cadena began performing with Jon Caspi & The First Gun on guitar and singing lead on a few songs during live performances. Together, Cadena and Jon Caspi & The First Gun recorded a song called "SUN" which was digitally released on Brighton Bar Records in February 2016. The video for the song was released on April 19, 2016.

Cadena has also been performing with his band The Buzz Aldrin Trio, playing a variety of material which has included covers of Black Flag, Television, Wire, and The Sex Pistols.

As of 2017, he has been performing and recording with Jon Caspi and the First Gun, as well as his outfit Mister Stratosphere.

Cadena continues to play and record with Jon Caspi and the First Gun, releasing three singles in 2019 (two Jon Caspi originals, "Never Change" and "Stuck On You", plus a cover of The Who classic "The Kids Are Alright"). In May 2020, the band released another single ("Drill a Whole") from their forthcoming album, "Live at 650".

In 2021, Cadena contributed lead guitar to a track called "Proof" by the horror punk band Lords of October, written by Uncle Salem, Lucifer Fulci, Aleister Kane, and October Phoenix for their concept album, "Cryptozoology". The lyric video also featuring Cadena was released on December 25, 2021, on LordsofOctober.com and YouTube.

In September and October 2022, Jon Caspi and the First Gun had several releases on Fake Chapter Records featuring Cadena, including a re-recording of "Raise 'Em High" with special guest Jesse Malin, a "live in the studio" album (The Studio 650 Sessions), and a more roots-rock oriented ep (Raise 'Em High and Other Delights).

=== FLAG ===
In 2013, Keith Morris, Chuck Dukowski, Dez Cadena, Bill Stevenson and Descendents member Stephen Egerton, created FLAG as an offshoot of Black Flag. As of now, they are only touring. No plans for an album have been announced.

=== DONDO ===
In sept of 2025 Dez Cadena played with his band Dondo at BlueBeach Studios in Redondo Beach California

FLAG
- Genres: Hardcore punk; Cover
- Years active: 2013-
- Spinoff of: Black Flag, Descendents
- Members: Keith Morris; Chuck Dukowski; Dez Cadena; Bill Stevenson; Stephen Egerton

== Discography ==
=== Black Flag ===
- "Louie Louie" (1981) *vocals
- Six Pack EP (1981) *vocals
- Damaged *rhythm guitar
- TV Party EP (1982) *rhythm guitar
- Everything Went Black (1982) *vocals

=== Redd Kross ===
- Desperate Teenage Lovedolls soundtrack (1984)

=== DC3 ===
- This Is the Dream (1985)
- The Good Hex (1985)
- You're Only as Blind... (1986)
- Vida (live recordings from SST) (1989)

=== Vida ===
- Vida (1995)

=== Loaded ===
- Episode 1999: Live (1999)

=== Carnage Asada ===
- Familia Carnage Asada EP (1997)
- Permanent Trails (1999)

=== Misfits ===
- Cuts from the Crypt (2001)
- Project 1950 (2003)
- "Day the Earth Caught Fire" (2003)
- "Land of the Dead" (2009)
- "Twilight of the Dead" (2009)
- The Devil's Rain (2011)
- Dead Alive! (2013)
- "Descending Angel" (2013)
- "Science Fiction/Double Feature" (2013)
- Horror X-Mas (2013)

=== Osaka Popstar ===
- Osaka Popstar and the American Legends of Punk (2006)

=== Jon Caspi and the First Gun ===
- "SUN" single (2016)
- "Never Change" single (2019)
- "The Kids Are Alright" single (2019)
- "Stuck on You" single (2019)
- "Drill a Whole" single (2020)
- "Hold On" single (2021)
- "She Is Fine" single (2021)
- "Raise 'Em High" single – Fake Chapter Records (2022)
- "The Studio 650 Sessions" full length – Fake Chapter Records (2022)
- "Raise 'Em High & Other Delights" ep – Fake Chapter Records (2022)
- "Raise 'Em High/Nervous Breakdown 7" vinyl – Fake Chapter Records (2023)

=== Lords of October ===
- "Proof" single (2022)

=== 3rd Rate ===
- "By Reason or By Force" EP (2024)

== Instruments ==
- Gibson Sonex (used on Damaged)
- Gibson Flying V
- Clear red B.C. Rich Warlock called "Lollipop"
- Schecter C-1 XXX
- Schecter C-1 Elite
- A black Ibanez AR Artist called "Black Betty" (used after Damaged and on many recordings afterwards)
- Black Gibson Les Paul Standard (with the Misfits)
- Schecter Damien Solo Elite (back up/touring guitar with the Misfits)
