= Evillive II =

Evilive II

Live album by the Misfits
- Released: August 14, 1998
- Recorded: October 31, 1997–March 10, 1998
- Genre: Punk rock; horror punk
- Label: Caroline

Misfits chronology
American Psycho (1997)	Evilive II (1998)	Famous Monsters (1999)

Evilive II (also known as Evillive) is a 1998 live album by the American punk rock band Misfits. Featuring the "resurrected" (Note: The Misfits were formed in 1977 by original vocalist Glenn Danzig. The band went through several lineup changes before dissolving in 1983. After a series of legal battles between Danzig and former bandmates Jerry Only and Doyle Wolfgang von Frankenstein, the band was reformed in 1995 with Michale Graves as the vocalist, Only on bass, Doyle on guitar, and Dr. Chud on drums.) Misfits lineup of vocalist Michale Graves, bassist Jerry Only, guitarist Doyle Wolfgang von Frankenstein, and drummer Dr. Chud, the album was recorded between October 1997 and March 1998 at a number of concerts in the United States. The album was released on CD by Caroline Records on August 14, 1998, and was made exclusively available through the official Misfits' fan club, known as "the Fiend Club", and was also sold on tour. The CD has since gone out-of-print.

The album's title is reminiscent of the title of the band's previous live album, Evilive, which was released in 1982. The cover artwork for Evilive II was created by artist Pushead.

== Recording and release ==
The tracks for Evilive II were recorded live at various concert venues throughout the United States between October 31, 1997, and March 10, 1998. The album was released on CD by Caroline Records on August 14, 1998, and was made available to members of the official Misfits' fan club, known as "the Fiend Club", by mail order. The album was also sold on tour between 1998 and 2000. The cover artwork for the album was created by artist Pushead. The first 1,000 copies were mistakenly printed in blue ink, and all subsequent copies were printed in white ink as originally intended. The CD has since gone out-of-print.

Bootleg recordings of Evilive II on CD were available in Europe as early as 2005. The album was also bootlegged and released in Germany on LP records.

== Track listing ==
All tracks are written by the Misfits (Michale Graves, Jerry Only, Doyle Wolfgang von Frankenstein, and Dr. Chud) except where noted.

No.	Title	Recording date/location	Length
1.	"Intro / Abominable Dr. Phibes"	October 31, 1997, The Palace, Los Angeles	1:46
2.	"American Psycho"	October 31, 1997, The Palace, Los Angeles	2:05
3.	"Walk Among Us"	October 31, 1997, The Palace, Los Angeles	1:16
4.	"The Hunger"	October 31, 1997, The Palace, Los Angeles	1:38
5.	"From Hell They Came"	October 31, 1997, The Palace, Los Angeles	2:06
6.	"Speak of the Devil"	November 8, 1997, Ogden Theatre, Denver	1:43
7.	"Last Caress" (Glenn Danzig)	November 8, 1997, Ogden Theatre, Denver	1:55
8.	"Dig Up Her Bones"	October 31, 1997, The Palace, Los Angeles	2:52
9.	"American Nightmare" (Danzig)	November 8, 1997, Ogden Theatre, Denver	1:34
10.	"Day of the Dead"	November 17, 1997, Bohager's, Baltimore	2:08
11.	"Hate the Living, Love the Dead"	November 5, 1997, La Luna, Portland, Oregon	1:36
12.	"Shining"	November 8, 1997, Ogden Theatre, Denver	2:47
13.	"Don't Open 'Til Doomsday"	March 10, 1998, White Rabbit, San Antonio	3:11
14.	"This Island Earth"	November 17, 1997, Bohager's, Baltimore	2:10
15.	"Where Eagles Dare" (Danzig)	November 14, 1997, Agora Theatre, Cleveland	1:56
16.	"Bullet" (Danzig)	November 5, 1997, La Luna, Portland, Oregon	1:24
17.	"Vampira" (Danzig)	March 10, 1998, White Rabbit, San Antonio	1:25
18.	"The Haunting"	November 14, 1997, Agora Theatre, Cleveland	1:26
19.	"Die, Die My Darling" (Danzig)	November 8, 1997, Ogden Theatre, Denver	3:08

== Personnel ==
The Misfits

- Michale Graves – vocals
- Jerry Only – bass
- Doyle Wolfgang von Frankenstein – guitar
- Dr. Chud – drums

Personnel

- Dr. Chud – mixing
- John Smith – mastering
- Ian Heath – engineer
- Greg Mattison – engineer
