= Arthur Suydam =

American comic book artist (born 1953)

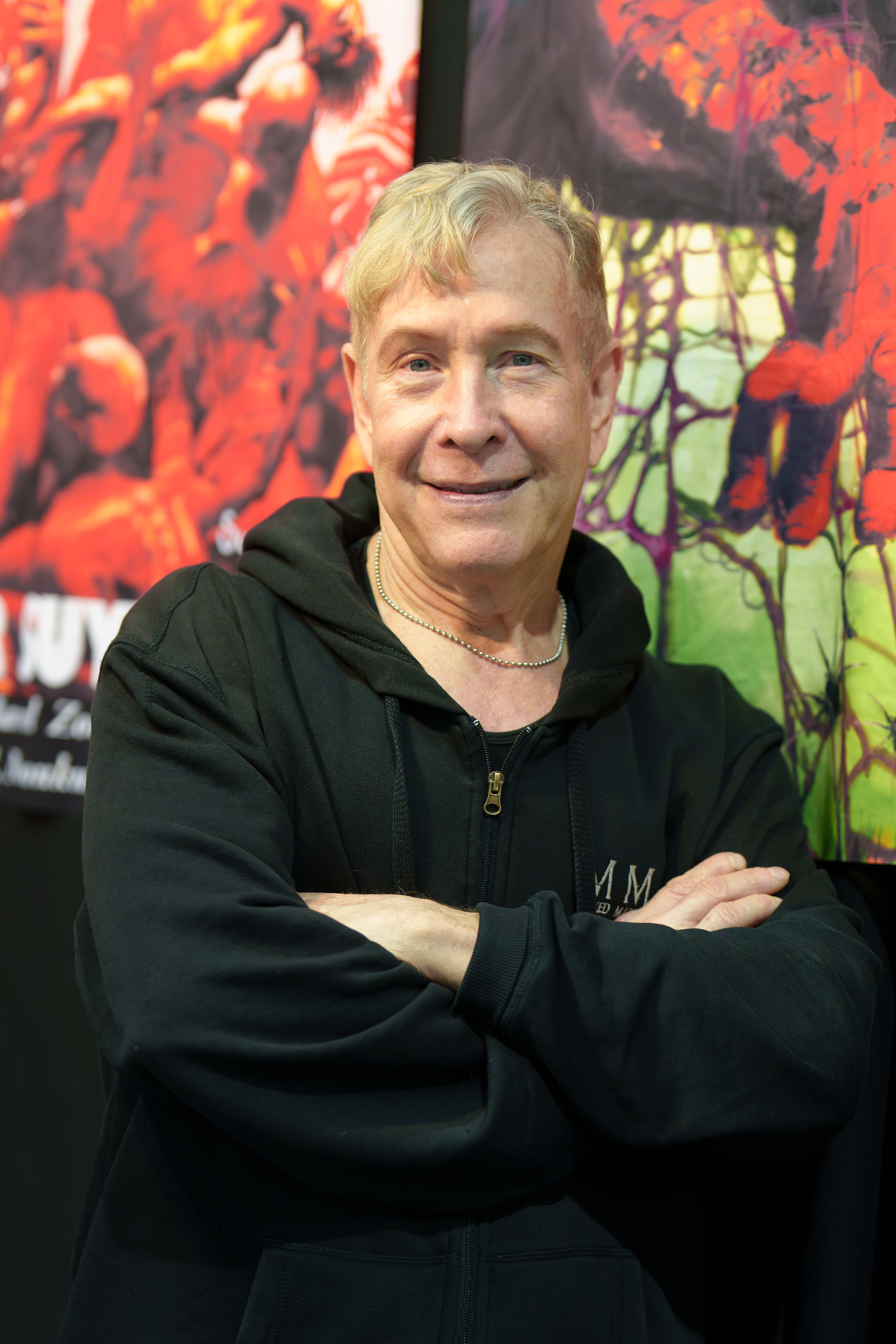
- Suydam at Big Lick Comic Con 2026 in Roanoke, Virginia
- Born: May 18, 1953 (age 73)
- Area: Artist
- Notable works: Marvel Zombies

Arthur Suydam (/suːˈdæm/; born May 18, 1953) is an American comic book artist known for his work on Marvel Zombies, Deadpool, Black Panther, and KISS Zombies. He has done artwork for magazines including Heavy Metal, Epic Illustrated and National Lampoon, while his comic book work includes Batman, Conan, Tarzan, Predator, Aliens, Death Dealer, and Marvel Zombies.

== Early life ==
Arthur Suydam was born May 18, 1953. His great-uncle, John Suydam, was an artist in the 19th-century Hudson River School of painting. He began drawing at age four, and while in high school, discovered a collection of workbooks from the Famous Artists Correspondence Course, from which he discovered Albert Dorne and Norman Rockwell, who became his early influences. A reader of comics throughout his life, he was also inspired by the art of Frank Frazetta and Graham Ingels.

== Career ==
Suydam's first published work appeared in Warren Publishing's Creepy magazine.

Suydam has contributed work to many publications, House of Secrets, House of Mystery, Epic Illustrated and National Lampoon, as well as international sci-fi and comic anthologies.

Suydam's creator-owned projects include Mudwogs and Mudwogs II, which first appeared in Heavy Metal magazine, The Adventures of Cholly and Flytrap, and Demon Dreams #1–2 (1984) for Pacific Comics.

In 1993 Suydam joined the editorial staff of the anthology magazine Penthouse Comix. In addition to creating his "Libby in the Lost World" series to the publication, he also served as colorist on other contributors' contributions, and as an adviser to editors George Caragonne and Bob Guccione in selecting contributors to the magazine.

Suydam's other creator-owned work includes Arthur Suydam: The Art of the Barbarian, Skin Deep, The Alien Encounters Poster Book, Visions: The Art of Arthur Suydam, and Bedtime Stories for the Incarcerated.

Arthur Suydam's comic book work includes such titles as Batman, Conan, Tarzan, Predator, Aliens and Death Dealer. His cover work includes Marvel Zombies, Ghost Rider, Hellstorm, Moon Knight, Wolverine, Marvel Zombies vs. The Army of Darkness, and Raise the Dead.

Suydam created the box art for the game Touch the Dead, and provided the cover art to the Mickey Spillane (with Max Allan Collins) novel Dead Street. He has also done cover artwork for the horror punk band the Misfits, including their 2009 single "Land of the Dead" and 2011 album The Devil's Rain. He has also done several album covers for The Misfits.

Suydam's subsequent work includes Kiss Zombies and Red Sonja vs. Mars Attacks for Dynamite Publishing.

== Cover work ==
=== Marvel Comics homage covers ===
The cover of each issue of the Marvel Zombies-related book is a homage cover of a famous cover from Marvel history, featuring zombie versions of the characters.

- Marvel Zombies #1, 1st printing – Amazing Fantasy #15, by Steve Ditko
- Marvel Zombies #1, 2nd printing – Spider-Man #1, by Todd McFarlane
- Marvel Zombies #1, 3rd printing – The Amazing Spider-Man #50, by John Romita, Sr.
- Marvel Zombies #1, 4th printing – The Incredible Hulk #1, by Jack Kirby
- Marvel Zombies #2 – Avengers #4, by Jack Kirby
- Marvel Zombies #3, 1st printing – The Incredible Hulk #340, by Todd McFarlane
- Marvel Zombies #3, 2nd printing – Daredevil #179, by Frank Miller
- Marvel Zombies #4, 1st printing – X-Men #1, by Jack Kirby
- Marvel Zombies #4, 2nd printing – Amazing Spider-Man #39, by John Romita, Sr.
- Marvel Zombies #5, 1st printing – Amazing Spider-Man Annual #21, by John Romita, Sr.
- Marvel Zombies #5, 2nd printing – Silver Surfer #1, by John Buscema
- Marvel Zombies collection, 1st printing – Secret Wars #1, by Mike Zeck
- Marvel Zombies collection, 2nd printing – Amazing Spider-Man #316, by Todd McFarlane
- Marvel Zombies collection, 3rd printing – Fantastic Four #49, by Jack Kirby
- Marvel Zombies collection, 4th printing – Avengers #1, by Jack Kirby
- Marvel Zombies collection, 5th printing – Mary Jane #2, by Takeshi Miyazawa
- Marvel Zombies collection, 6th printing is a homage to Iron Man #128, by Bob Layton
- Ultimate Fantastic Four #30 (variant cover) – Fantastic Four #1, by Jack Kirby
- Ultimate Fantastic Four #31 (variant cover) – Fantastic Four #51, by Jack Kirby
- Ultimate Fantastic Four #32 (variant cover), is a homage to Fantastic Four #8, by Jack Kirby
- Marvel Zombies: Dead Days – X-Men vol. 2 #1, by Jim Lee.
- Marvel Zombies vs Army of Darkness #1, 1st printing – X-Men #141, by John Byrne
- Marvel Zombies vs Army of Darkness #1, 2nd printing – X-Men #137, by John Byrne
- Marvel Zombies vs Army of Darkness #1, 3rd printing – Captain America #1, by Jack Kirby
- Marvel Zombies vs Army of Darkness #2 – X-Men #268, by Jim Lee
- Marvel Zombies vs Army of Darkness #3, 1st printing – Superman vs. the Amazing Spider-Man, by Dick Giordano
- Marvel Zombies vs Army of Darkness #3, 2nd printing – The Death of Captain Marvel graphic novel, by Jim Starlin
- Marvel Zombies vs Army of Darkness #4 – Captain America #100, by Syd Shores
- Marvel Zombies vs Army of Darkness #5 – Wolverine #1 (1982), by Frank Miller
- Black Panther #27 – Fantastic Four #3, by Jack Kirby
- Black Panther #28 – Fantastic Four #116, by John Buscema
- Black Panther #29 – Avengers #87, by John Buscema
- Black Panther #30 – Fantastic Four #4, by Jack Kirby
- Marvel Zombies Poster Book is a homage to Secret Wars #8 by Mike Zeck
- Marvel Zombies 2 #1 — the variant cover of Civil War #1, by Michael Turner
- Marvel Zombies 2 #2 – Marvel Comics #1, by Frank Paul
- Marvel Zombies 2 #3 – Tales of Suspense #39 by Don Heck
- Marvel Zombies 2 #4 – Nick Fury, Agent of SHIELD #4, by Jim Steranko
- Marvel Zombies 2 #5 – Silver Surfer #4, by John Buscema

==== Other homage covers for Marvel ====
- Deadpool: Merc with a Mouth #1 – Savage Tales #1 comic cover
- Deadpool: Merc with a Mouth #2 – Jaws movie poster
- Deadpool: Merc with a Mouth #3 – Dawn of the Dead movie poster
- Deadpool: Merc with a Mouth #4 – Scarface (1983) movie poster
- Deadpool: Merc with a Mouth #5 – Pretty Woman movie poster
- Deadpool: Merc with a Mouth #6 – Alien movie poster
- Deadpool: Merc with a Mouth #7 – Trainspotting movie poster
- Deadpool: Merc with a Mouth #8 – One Million Years B.C. movie poster
- Deadpool: Merc with a Mouth #9 – The Graduate movie poster
- Deadpool: Merc with a Mouth #10 – Frank Miller's Wolverine #1 cover
- Deadpool: Merc with a Mouth #11 – Lone Wolf and Cub manga cover
- Deadpool: Merc with a Mouth #12 – Nirvana – Nevermind album cover
- Deadpool: Merc with a Mouth #13 – Silence of the Lambs movie cover

==== Other Marvel covers ====
- Amazing Spider-Girl #13 'Zombie' Variant
- Avengers/Invaders #9 Variant
- Fantastic Four #554 'Skrull' Variant
- Ghost Rider #08
- Ghost Rider #09
- Ghost Rider #10
- Ghost Rider #11
- Ghost Rider #30
- Ghost Rider #31
- Ghost Rider #32
- Ghost Rider #33
- Ghost Rider #34
- Ghost Rider #35
- Incredible Hercules #121
- Incredible Hercules #122 'Zombie' Variant
- Moon Knight #14 (3rd series, 2006)
- Moon Knight #15
- Moon Knight #16
- Moon Knight #17
- Moon Knight #18
- Moon Knight #19
- Moon Knight #21
- Moon Knight #22
- Moon Knight #23
- Moon Knight #24
- Moon Knight #25
- Rawhide Kid #4
- Thor #1 Variant
- Thor #1 'Zombie' Variant
- Wolverine #57
- Wolverine #58
- Wolverine #59
- Wolverine #60
- Wolverine #61
- Wolverine Origins #10 Variant
