= Osaka Popstar and the American Legends of Punk =

Studio album by Osaka Popstar
- Released: May 23, 2006
- Genre: Punk rock
- Length: 27:39
- Labels: Misfits, Rykodisc
- Producer: John Cafiero

Professional ratings
Review scores
Source	Rating
Absolutepunk.net	66% link
Allmusic	link
RebelPunk	link

Osaka Popstar and the American Legends of Punk is the first, and so far only, album released by Osaka Popstar. The title references the fact that the band includes members of legendary punk bands such as The Misfits, Ramones, Black Flag and The Voidoids.

The CD came with a DVD that included music videos for "Wicked World" and "Insects".

== Track listing ==
1. "Wicked World" (Daniel Johnston) – 2:58
2. "Astro Boy" (Donald Rockwell, Tatsuo Takai) – 1:30
3. "Sailor Moon" (Andy Heyward, Tetsuya Komoro, Kanako Oda) – 1:11
4. "Man of Constant Sorrow" (Traditional, arranged by John Cafiero) – 3:20
5. "Insects" (Davis Aronin, Carl Brown Jerron Cool, Keisha Dotson, Brenda Garcia, Inisinna, Kids Of Widney High, Michael Monagan) – 2:06
6. "I Live Off You" (Marianne Elliot, a.k.a. Poly Styrene) – 1:50
7. "Xmas Intro (That Almost Wasn't)" (Ray Carter) – 0:10
8. "The Christmas That Almost Wasn't" (Carter, Paul Tripp) – 1:38
9. "Love Comes in Spurts" (Richard Hell) – 1:53
10. "Blank Generation" (Hell) – 2:47
11. "Monsters" (Cafiero) – 2:52
12. "Where's the Cap'n?" (Cafiero) – 2:25
13. "Shaolin Monkeys" (Cafiero) – 2:58

== Personnel ==
- John Cafiero – vocals
- Jerry Only – bass
- Dez Cadena – lead guitar
- Ivan Julian – rhythm guitar
- Marky Ramone – drums

== Cover songs ==
Among the songs on the album are cover versions of the title tracks from the anime series Astro Boy and Sailor Moon, and the Rossano Brazzi film The Christmas That Almost Wasn't.
