= Osaka Popstar =

American punk rock band

- Origin: New York City
- Genres: Punk rock
- Years active: 2006–present
- Label: Misfits Records
- Members: John Cafiero; Jerry Only; Marky Ramone; Dez Cadena; Ivan Julian

Osaka Popstar is a punk rock supergroup formed in 2006 by New Yorker John Cafiero. In 2006, Cafiero teamed up with several well known punk rock artists to create the anime based punk group, Osaka Popstar. They released their debut album/DVD on May 23, 2006. Their lyrics consist of topics such as characters in Japanese anime like Astroboy and Sailor Moon. The first single off the album was a cover of singer/songwriter Daniel Johnston, entitled "Wicked World."

They toured as special guests with the Misfits in Fiend Fest '06 across the United States and other dates in Europe with stops in Tijuana, Mexico, and Montreal, Canada, in October and November 2006.

Their album was released in Japan in June 2007. In 2008, they released a live EP, which was recorded on Halloween night 2006 on the Fiend Fest. In 2012, Cafiero, backed by the band Juicehead and credited to Osaka Popstar X Juicehead, released a cover of Fugazi's "Waiting Room". Since 2013, the band has sporadically released singles.

In 2017, Osaka Popstar backed "Weird Al" Yankovic in covering the Ramones song "Beat on the Brat" for a Dr. Demento tribute album. With its raging electric guitars, Rolling Stone called it "a blistering, accordion-tinged cover."

== Members ==
=== Current ===
The most recent release, "Christmas in the Loony Bin", features the following lineup:

- John Cafiero – vocals
- Dean Rispler – guitars, bass
- Jon Wurster – drums

=== Previous ===
- Dennis Diken – drums
- Sal Maida – bass
- Jerry Only – bass, backing Vocals
- Dez Cadena – lead guitar
- Ivan Julian – rhythm guitar
- Marky Ramone – drums

== Discography ==
=== Albums ===
- Osaka Popstar and the American Legends of Punk (2006)

=== EP ===
- Rock'em O-Sock 'em Live! (2008)

=== Singles ===
- "Shaolin Monkeys" (2008)
- "Waiting Room" (2012) (with Juicehead)
- "Super Hero" (2013)
- "Hopping Ghosts" (2014)
- "O Holy Night" (2014)
- "Christmas in the Loony Bin" (2016)
