= Misfits Records =

Record label

- Founded: 2002
- Founder: Jerry Only; John Cafiero
- Genre: Punk
- Country of origin: U.S.
- Location: New York City
- Official website: www.misfitsrecords.com

Misfits Records is an independent record label conceived of in 2002 by founders Jerry Only of the Misfits and John Cafiero of Osaka Popstar. Intended to release Misfits material after the band's contractual obligations to Roadrunner Records were fulfilled by 2001's Cuts from the Crypt, the label's first non-Misfits signing was Japanese horror punk band Balzac, and its first release was the Misfits/Balzac split single "Day the Earth Caught Fire". In 2003 the label became a formal company and launched worldwide with its first full-length releases. Misfits Records has also released material by The Nutley Brass, Osaka Popstar, and JuiceheaD.

== Releases ==
Year	Artist	Title	Format	Type	Catalog
2002	Misfits / Balzac	"Day the Earth Caught Fire"	CD	single	MIS-01392
2003	Misfits	Project 1950	CD/DVD	studio album	MSF-06432
2003	Balzac	Beyond the Darkness	CD/DVD	compilation album	MSF-06442
2005	Misfits meet The Nutley Brass	Fiend Club Lounge	CD	studio album	MSF-08052
2005	Balzac	Out of the Grave and into the Dark	CD/DVD	compilation album	MSF-081620
2006	Osaka Popstar	Osaka Popstar and the American Legends of Punk	CD/DVD	studio album	
2006	Misfits	Psycho in the Wax Museum	Promotional 7"	single	MP-POP 001
2007	JuiceheaD	The Devil Made Me Do It	CD	studio album	MRCD 01398
2007	Balzac	Deep Blue: Chaos from Darkism	CD/DVD	studio album	MRCD-01399/MRCD-01400
2007	Balzac	"Deep Blue" / "Alone"	shaped picture disc	single	MRPD-00010
2007	Osaka Popstar	"Shaolin Monkeys"	shaped picture disc	single	MRPD-00020
2008	Osaka Popstar	Rock'Em O-Sock'Em Live!	CD	live album	MRCD 01430
2009	Misfits	"Land of the Dead"	12"	single	MRLP 01450
2010	JuiceheaD	"Rotting from the Inside"	7"	single	MR45 01460
2010	Balzac	The Birth of Hatred	CD/DVD	compilation album	MRCD-01440
2010	Juicehead	"Lorraine"	CD Single	From the album "How to Sail a Sinking Ship"	
2011	JuiceheaD	How to Sail a Sinking Ship	CD	studio album	MRCD-01480
2011	Misfits	"Twilight of the Dead"	12"	single	MRLP 01470
2011	Misfits	The Devil's Rain	CD	studio album	MRCD-01490
2012	Klaus Beyer covers Osaka Popstar	Die Shaolin Affen EP	7"	EP	MR45 01520
2012	JuiceheaD x Osaka Popstar	"Waiting Room"	7"	single	MR45 01530
2012	Balzac	Paradox	12"	EP	MRLP 01540
2013	Misfits	Dead Alive!	CD, LP	live album	MRCD 01550
2013	Osaka Popstar	"Super Hero"	12"	single	MRLP 01560
