= Animal Room =

- DVD cover
- Directed by: Craig Singer
- Written by: Craig Singer
- Produced by: Craig Singer; Sylvia Caminer
- Starring: Neil Patrick Harris; Matthew Lillard
- Cinematography: Amy Vincent
- Edited by: Sabine Hoffmann
- Production company: Vanguard International Cinema
- Distributed by: ViewCave
- Release date: 1995
- Running time: 98 minutes
- Country: United States
- Language: English

Animal Room is a 1995 American thriller drama film directed, produced, and written by Craig Singer and starring Neil Patrick Harris as a bullied drug-using teenager and Matthew Lillard as the bully who loves to torment Harris's character. The film is referred to as a modernized version of A Clockwork Orange and features an appearance from the punk rock band Misfits.

== Cast ==
- Neil Patrick Harris as Arnold Mosk
- Matthew Lillard as Doug Van Housen
- Catherine Hicks as Mrs. Mosk
- Amanda Peet as Debbie
- Gabriel Olds as Gary Trancer
- Lori Heuring as Shelly
- Michael Torpey as Shelly's Brother
- Brian Vincent as Eddie LeMaster
- Stephen Pearlman as Principal Jones
