= Project 1950 =

Studio album by the Misfits
- Released: July 29, 2003
- Genre: Punk rock
- Length: 24:20
- Label: Misfits Records
- Producer: John Cafiero

The Misfits chronology
Famous Monsters (1999)	Project 1950 (2003)	Psycho in the Wax Museum (2006)

Singles from Project 1950
- 1. "This Magic Moment" Released: 2003

Project 1950 is the sixth studio album by the American horror punk band the Misfits, released in 2003. It consists of cover versions of rock and roll songs from the 1950s and 60's and marks bassist Jerry Only's debut as the Misfits' lead singer. Except for Only, no members of the band from their previous album returned for Project 1950.

The album cover artwork was done by Pennsylvania artist Tony Squindo. The liner notes include explanations from the band members about why they chose each particular song.

Receiving generally positive critical reviews from publications such as Allmusic, the album became a commercial success and hit the No. 2 slot on Billboard's 'Top Heatseekers' chart as well as No. 5 on its 'Top Independent Albums' chart.

== Recording ==
Ronnie Spector guest starred as a backing vocalist on two tracks. Other members of the band at that point had also previously been associated with famous groups, with a lineup including punk rockers Marky Ramone of the Ramones and Dez Cadena of Black Flag. Marky said in 2011 he was compelled to join out of pity for Jerry as he had recently bought the rights to the band name but only to have the original members walk off on him.

In October 2014, the band released an expanded edition of the album, adding three new tracks with current drummer Eric "Chupacabra" Arce performing on the new tracks. A limited picture disc LP of the expanded album was also released with new artwork by Tom Whalen

== Reception ==
Professional ratings
Review scores
Source	Rating
AllMusic	3/5 stars
Punknews.org	3.5/5 stars

The album received positive reviews. AllMusic ran a supportive review by critic Johnny Loftus, who stated that "it's good to hear their excitement in the recordings, which crackle with enthusiasm" and called the album "really enjoyable in a nostalgia sort of way". Reviewing the Expanded Edition of the album Ken Pierce, of Piercing Metal stated "Overall the tunes retain a large part of their original sound but with there being renditions by The Misfits they are faster and quicker to finish when it all comes down to it." rating the album 4 out of 5.

== Track listing ==
No.	Title	Writer(s)	Original artist	Length
1.	"This Magic Moment"	Doc Pomus, Mort Shuman	The Drifters	2:36
2.	"Dream Lover"	Bobby Darin	Bobby Darin	2:28
3.	"Diana"	Paul Anka	Paul Anka	2:09
4.	"Donna"	Ritchie Valens	Ritchie Valens	2:33
5.	"Great Balls of Fire"	Otis Blackwell, Jack Hammer	Jerry Lee Lewis	1:50
6.	"Latest Flame"	Pomus, Shuman	Elvis Presley	2:17
7.	"Monster Mash"	Bobby Pickett, Leonard L. Capizzi	Bobby (Boris) Pickett and the Crypt-Kickers	2:37
8.	"Only Make Believe"	Conway Twitty, Jack Nance	Conway Twitty	2:16
9.	"Runaway"	Del Shannon, Max Crook	Del Shannon	2:24
10.	"You Belong to Me"	Pee Wee King, Chilton Price, Redd Stewart	Jo Stafford	3:10
Total length:				24:20

Expanded edition
No.	Title	Writer(s)	Original artist	Length
11.	"Witchcraft"	Cy Coleman, Carolyn Leigh	Frank Sinatra	1:47
12.	"Daughter of Darkness"	Les Reed, Geoff Stephens	Tom Jones	2:40
13.	"(You're the) Devil in Disguise"	Bill Giant, Bernie Baum, Florence Kaye	Elvis Presley	2:43
Total length:				31:30

== Charts ==
Chart (2003)	Peak position
US Billboard 200	133
US Independent Albums (Billboard)	5
US Heatseekers Albums (Billboard)	2

== Bonus DVD ==
1. "This Magic Moment"
2. "Dream Lover"
3. "Diana"
4. "Donna"
5. "Runaway"
- Tracks 1–4, recorded at the Phillips US Open Snowboarding Championships
- Track 5, recorded live, at The World in NYC

Bonus material

- Day the Earth Caught Fire: Live in NYC- Misfits with Balzac
- The Haunting/Don't Open 'Till Doomsday: Live in Japan- Balzac with Misfits
- Day the Earth Caught Fire: Live in Japan- Balzac with Misfits
- The Haunting/Don't Open 'Till Doomsday- Balzac
- Out of the Blue- Balzac

== Personnel ==
Misfits

- Jerry Only – bass, lead vocals
- Marky Ramone – drums, percussion
- Dez Cadena – guitars

Additional

- John Cafiero – background vocals on "Dream Lover", "Monster Mash" and "Runaway"
- Ronnie Spector – background vocals on "This Magic Moment" and "You Belong to Me"
- Jimmy Destri – keyboards on "Runaway" and "Great Balls of Fire"
- Ed Manion – saxophone on "Diana" and "Runaway"
- Eric "Chupacabra" Arce – drums, percussion on "Witchcraft", "Daughter of Darkness" and "(You're the) Devil in Disguise"
