= Dig Up Her Bones =

- The cover of the single features an image of the Bride from Bride of Frankenstein.

Single by the Misfits

from the album American Psycho
- B-side: "Hate the Living, Love the Dead"
- Released: July 1997
- Recorded: December 1996
- Genre: Horror punk • heavy metal
- Length: 3:02
- Label: Geffen
- Songwriter: Michale Graves
- Producer: Daniel Rey

Misfits singles chronology
"Die, Die My Darling" (1984)	"Dig Up Her Bones" (1997)	"I Wanna Be a NY Ranger" (1999)

Audio sample
- A portion of the song's chorus and main riff: file; help

"Dig Up Her Bones" is the seventh single by the punk rock band the Misfits. It was the first single released by the reformed lineup of the band after the original incarnation broke up in 1983. It was the only single released from their 1997 album American Psycho, and the accompanying music video was the first official Misfits music video ever released.

== Background ==
The original incarnation of the Misfits had been active from 1977 to 1983. A series of legal battles ensued in the late 1980s and early 1990s, with bassist Jerry Only and his brother, guitarist Doyle Wolfgang von Frankenstein, seeking writing credits and the rights to the Misfits name from singer/songwriter Glenn Danzig. The result was an out-of-court settlement in 1995, which gave Only and Doyle the rights to record and perform as the Misfits, sharing merchandising rights with Danzig. They quickly formed a new incarnation of the band, recruiting singer Michale Graves and drummer Dr. Chud. The new lineup released American Psycho in 1997 with "Dig Up Her Bones" as the seventh track.

Graves originally wrote the song prior to joining the Misfits when he was 16 years old.

== Release information ==
5,000 copies of the single were issued on blue 7" vinyl, while a promotional CD single was distributed to radio stations. The B-side of the single is "Hate the Living, Love the Dead", also from American Psycho.

== Music video ==
The music video for "Dig Up Her Bones" was directed by John Cafiero, who also directed a video for "American Psycho". It was the first official music video ever released by the Misfits and was composed of live footage of the band, Graves singing in a mock graveyard, and clips from the 1935 horror film Bride of Frankenstein. An image of the Bride was used as the cover image for the single. Permission to use the likeness of Boris Karloff, who played the Monster in the film, was given by his daughter Sara Karloff. Permission was also given by the estate of Elsa Lanchester, who played the Bride, to use her likeness. Two cuts of the music video were released, the only difference being that one version incorporated an intro with the 1930s Universal Pictures logo and a dialogue clip from Bride of Frankenstein. Live portions of the video were shot at Lupo's Heartbreak Hotel in Providence, Rhode Island, on June 22, 1997.

The video debuted on MTV's 120 Minutes and was also featured on the Sci Fi Channel. Along with the "American Psycho" video, it continued to run in rotation on MTV, MTV Europe, MTV Japan, MTV Latin America, MTV Brasil, MuchMusic, and The Box.

== Reception ==
J. Andrew of Metal Injection included "Dig Up Her Bones" on the cites of the 10 Best Misfits Songs to Blast on Halloween. In a 2021, poll held by Revolver it was voted the fifth best Misfits song the publication added "the song’s chunky riffage and enormous refrain proved that their reformation wasn’t a sloppy cash-grab, but the beginning of a fresh and vital new era."

== Track listing ==
All tracks are written by the Misfits (Michale Graves, Jerry Only, Doyle Wolfgang von Frankenstein, and Dr. Chud), except where noted.

Side A
No.	Title	Writer(s)	Length
1.	"Dig Up Her Bones"	Michale Graves	3:01

Side B
No.	Title	Length
1.	"Hate the Living, Love the Dead"	1:36
Total length:		4:37

== Personnel ==
=== Band ===
- Michale Graves – lead vocals
- Jerry Only – bass, backing vocals
- Doyle Wolfgang von Frankenstein – guitars
- Dr. Chud – drums, backing vocals

=== Additional musicians ===
- Daniel Rey – keyboards

== Certifications ==
Region	Certification	Certified units/sales
United States (RIAA)	Gold	500,000^{‡}
^{‡} Sales+streaming figures based on certification alone.
