= Homage cover =

Comic book cover design

In comics, a homage cover is the intentional copying of a cover from an earlier comic book or graphic novel that directly acknowledges the original artist. Homages often occur when a comic is rebooted to demonstrate continuity with earlier volumes. A common target of homage is the first edition of a particular comic (see list below).

== List of homage targets ==
Covers that have been frequently homaged include:

- Amazing Fantasy #15 - first appearance of Spider-Man; Spidey swings across the page carrying a crook
- Fantastic Four #1 - where a giant monster emerges from below a street.
- Action Comics #1 - where Superman holds a car over his head.
- Superman #1 - where Superman is posed in the middle of a leap high above a city skyline.
- Superman #14 - where Superman stands with a bald eagle on his left arm.
- Superman #243 - where Superman is kissing a woman whose face is not shown due to the perspective of the pose.
- Justice League #1 - members of the team standing in ranks looking upwards to the 'camera'.
- Giant-Size X-Men #1 - where the new team of X-Men seemingly burst out from the cover while the older X-Men team looks on horrified from above.
- The Incredible Hulk #1 - Bruce Banner is over shadowed by the Hulk.
- Superman #199 - Superman races the Flash in a foot race (cf. Superman #463).
- Batman: The Dark Knight Returns
- Adventure Comics #247
- Adventure Comics #300
- Avengers #4 - Best known for the heroes charging towards the reader, particularly Captain America holding his shield on one arm, with his right arm pointing backward.
- What If? #1 - Spider-Man and the Fantastic Four burst through a page of black-and-white comic book art.
- Uncanny X-Men #136 - A weeping Cyclops holds the dead Jean Grey in his arms. (As Thor #127 (1966) or after Crisis on Infinite Earths #7 (Superman 1985)). This kind of cover was an homage to Michelangelo's Pietà.
- Transformers #5 - Shockwave standing in front of a wall with the words "Are All Dead".
- Uncanny X-Men #141 - older versions of Wolverine and Kitty Pryde stand before a poster featuring their fallen comrades. The beginning of the "Days of Future Past" storyline.

== See also ==
- Comics vocabulary
- Marvel Zombies Covers – each cover in this series is a homage.
- Swipe (comics) – intentional copying in comics without crediting the original artist
