= Jerry Only =

American bassist

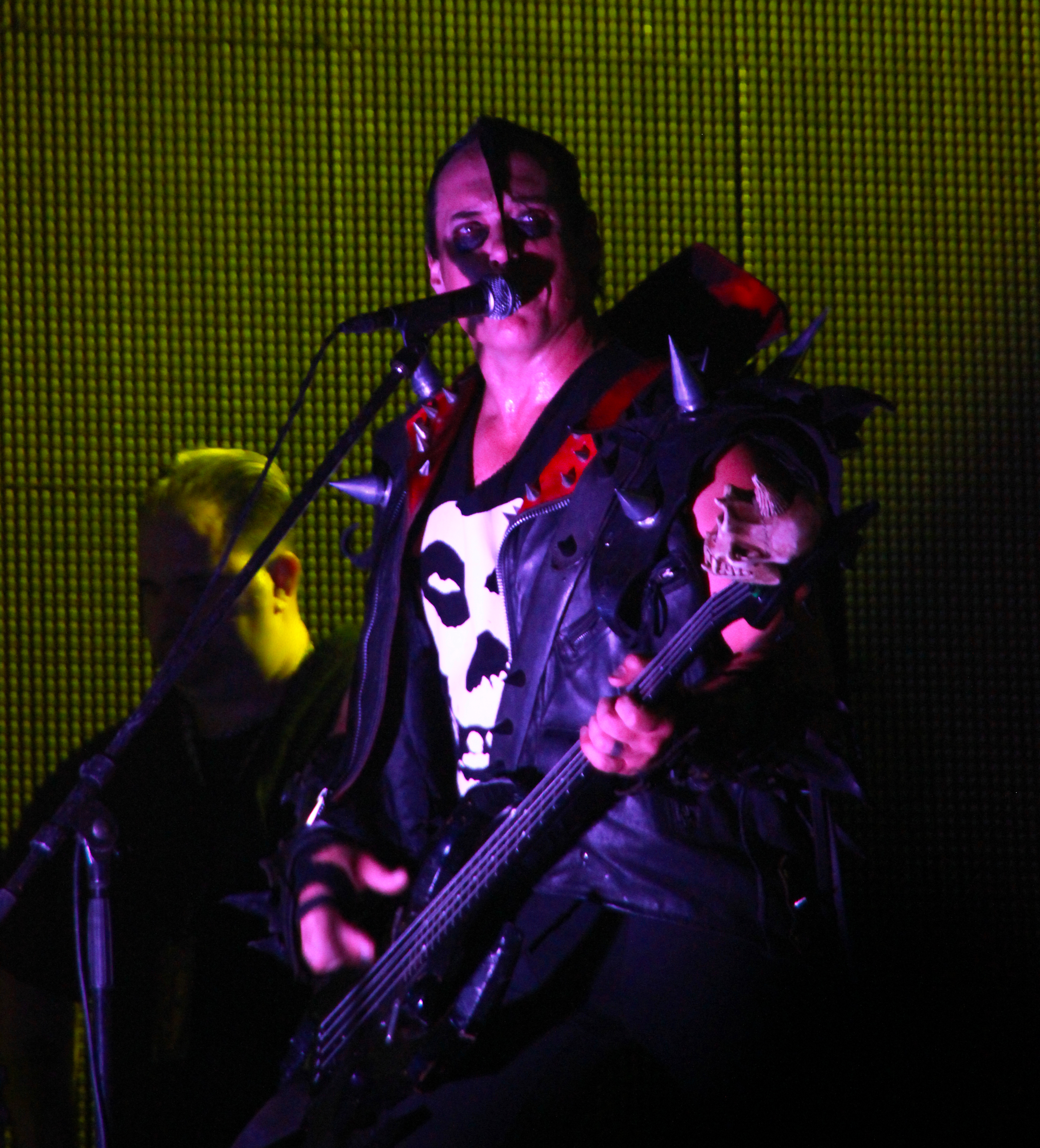
- Only performing in 2013

Background information
- Born: Gerald Caiafa Jr. April 21, 1959 (age 67); Lodi, New Jersey, US
- Genres: Horror punk, punk rock, heavy metal
- Occupations: Musician, singer
- Instruments: Bass, vocals
- Years active: 1977–present

Gerald Caiafa Jr. (born April 21, 1959), better known by his stage name Jerry Only, is an American musician, best known as the bassist, and later vocalist, for the Misfits. He is the only member to appear in every Misfits lineup except the original.

== Biography ==
=== Misfits ===
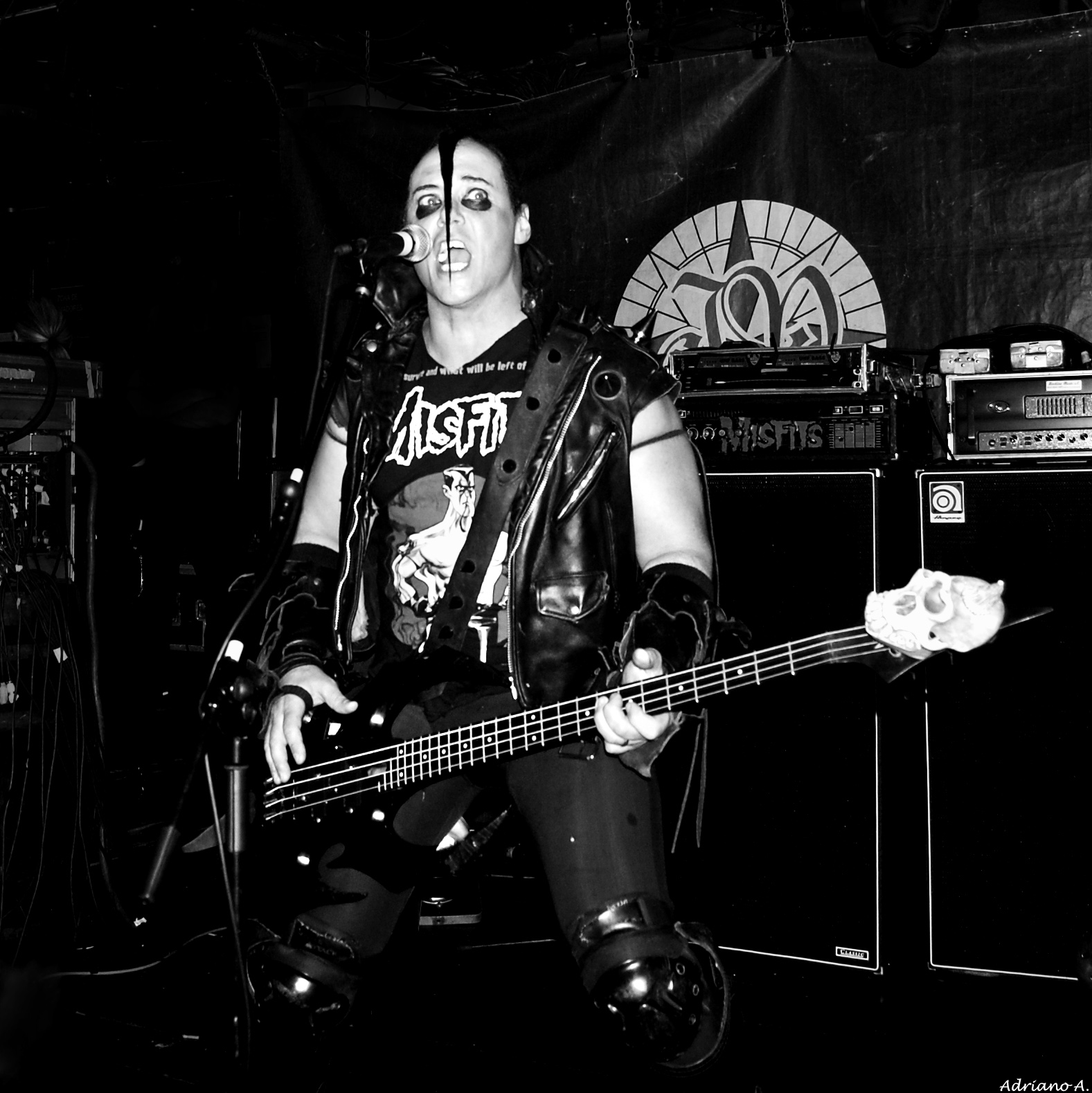
Only in 2008

Gerald Caiafa Jr. was born and raised in Lodi, New Jersey, and graduated in 1977 from Lodi High School, the same school attended by his future Misfits bandmates. Based on a review of the school's yearbooks, Vice magazine described him as "the coolest motherfucker that ever stepped foot in Lodi High School or possibly any school in the history of education."

He started The Misfits with Glenn Danzig on vocals and Manny Martínez on drums in 1977, just a few months after receiving his first bass as a late Christmas present. He would work at his father's machine shop during the week to help finance the band and play shows on the weekend. This would go on for several years and the band split due to differences between Danzig and the rest of the band. During this downtime, Only and his brother Doyle Wolfgang von Frankenstein (guitarist in the 1980-1983 lineup of the Misfits) formed Kryst The Conqueror. In 1995, Only settled a legal battle out of court with co-founder Glenn Danzig, allowing him rights to the Misfits' name on a performing level, while they split the money on merchandising. He reformed the band with Doyle, vocalist Michale Graves, and drummer Dr. Chud.

Chud and Graves left the group in 2000 to form Graves. In reaction to the loss of members, Doyle left the Misfits. Graves, Doyle and Chud were replaced on the M25 tour by Dez Cadena, formerly of Black Flag and DC3, on guitar and Marky Ramone, formerly of The Ramones, on drums. Only took up the singing duties from this point till the present date. In 2003, a cover album Project 1950 was released and marked Only’s debut as the band’s vocalist. In early 2005, Marky left the group and Only brought in ex-Misfit and Black Flag drummer ROBO to rejoin the group. A new album was recorded in 2010 in Colorado entitled The Devil's Rain which was released in October 2011. A single, "Land of the Dead", was released at the mischief night show 2009 at Starland Ballroom in Sayreville, New Jersey.

In 2013, Only and the Misfits released a new album entitled DEAD ALIVE! recorded live at several shows.

In May 2016, Only, Danzig, and Doyle announced that they would perform together for the first time in 33 years, under the name The Original Misfits Riot Fest in Chicago and Denver. In 2017, the reunited lineup performed two additional concerts at the MGM Grand Garden Arena in Las Vegas on December 28 and The Forum in Inglewood, California, on December 30. They also performed at the Prudential Center in Newark, New Jersey, on May 19, 2018, and at the Allstate Arena in suburban Chicago in 2019. The group played more shows together in 2021 and 2022, most recently they played at Coachella in 2025.

=== Kryst the Conqueror ===
In 1987, four years after the dissolution of the Misfits, Only and Doyle formed the metal band Kryst The Conqueror with drummer The Murp. Select songs from the album were released by Only's record label "Cyclopian Music" as an EP, and featured guest guitarist Dave "The Snake" Sabo of the rock band Skid Row.

=== World Championship Wrestling ===
In 1999, Only and the rest of the then Misfits lineup had a brief stint in World Championship Wrestling when they aligned with wrestler Vampiro. Only participated in probably the most memorable match of the Misfits' time when he fought Dr. Death in a steel cage match. Only was dominated in the match but Death was distracted when the rest of the Misfits interfered and attacked his manager Oklahoma (a parody of Jim Ross), pouring barbecue sauce in his eyes. Only won the match after being accidentally Irish whipped through the cage door by Dr. Death.

=== Other projects ===
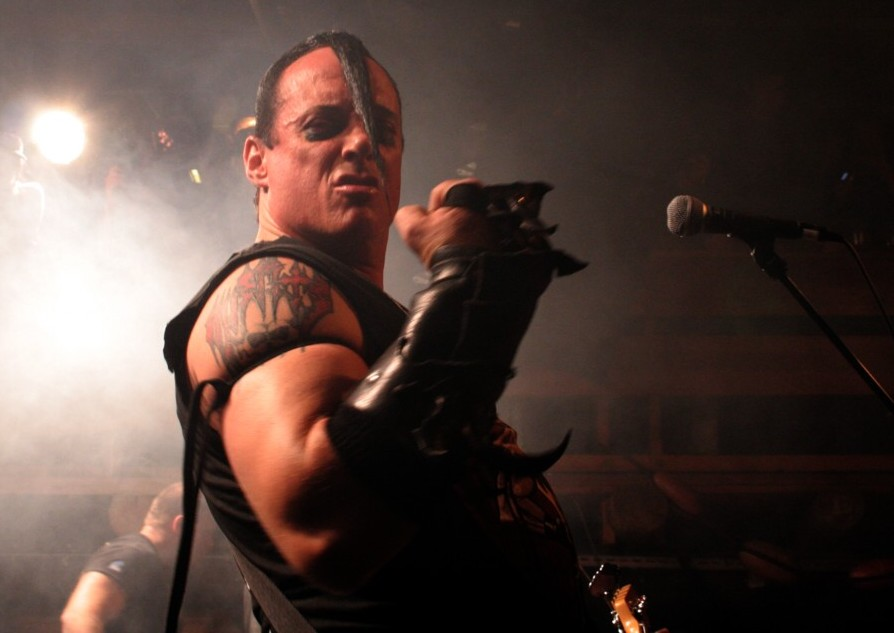
Only in 2006

In 2002, Only founded his own record label Misfits Records alongside John Cafiero. It was initially started to release Misfits material after the band's contractual obligations to Roadrunner Records were fulfilled, however they ended up putting out material for other bands as well.

During the mid 2000s Only was a member of the punk rock supergroup Osaka Popstar, with whom he recorded one album Osaka Popstar and the American Legends of Punk which was released in 2006.

In 2022, Only released his debut solo album Anti-Hero the album featured guest appearances from Dave Lombardo and Rob Caggiano.

=== Only/Danzig lawsuit ===
In May 2014, Glenn Danzig filed a lawsuit against Jerry Only, claiming Only registered trademarks for everything Misfits-related in 2000 behind Danzig's back, misappropriating exclusive ownership over the trademarks for himself, including the band's iconic "Crimson Ghost" logo. Danzig claims that this violated a 1994 contract the two had. Danzig says that after registering the trademarks, Only secretly entered into deals with various merchandisers and cut him out of any potential profits in the process. He said that Only has purposefully led merchandisers, including Hot Topic, to believe that they are legally bound not to accept licenses to exploit the Marks from Danzig or his designees, and Only continues to do so. He said that through this, Only has caused merchandisers not to do business with him and it has deceived consumers as to the source of the merchandise which bore the trademarks. Danzig said a vast majority of the Misfits fans associate the trademarks with the 1977–1983 classic Misfits era when Danzig was a member of the band and not with the current era Misfits. Danzig feels that through false advertising and misrepresentations to merchandisers and consumers it has caused him to suffer damages in excess of $75,000. In August 2014, the judge dismissed the case in favor of Only.

=== Sid Vicious ===
On 1 February 1979, Only attended a party on Bank Street in Manhattan’s Greenwich Village and was introduced to Sex Pistols bassist Sid Vicious who was in town to launch himself as a solo artist. Earlier in the day Vicious had been released on bail from Riker’s Island (where he had been undergoing forced detoxication after an assault on Todd Smith and breaking terms of his previous bail for the alleged murder of his girlfriend Nancy Spungen who was found stabbed to death at the Chelsea Hotel in October 1978). Only arrived early and was making bolognese sauce with Vicious' mother, Anne Beverly, but once Vicious' drug-taking friends arrived and started getting high, he left. Later that day he discovered that Vicious had died of an overdose which was widely reported as a suicide. Only maintains that Vicious overdosed accidentally from his tolerance being lower as the result of having been through rehabilitation whilst in prison.

== Gear ==
From 1977 to 1983, Only used a Rickenbacker SB4001 bass, with an acoustic amplifier with built-in distortion, Acoustic cabinets (one 18" speaker), Rotosound Round Wound strings. From 1987 to 1997, he began using his own custom made Rand Devastator bass. He then began using a Gothic Customs Devastator bass, with Ampeg SVT amplifiers, Ampeg SVT cabinets, along with an Acoustic amplifier.

== Personal life ==
Only has two daughters, and a son who performed with him as the guitarist of Misfits under the stage name Jerry Other while Only was the band’s vocalist. He was previously married to his wife Jonna but they have since divorced.

== Discography ==
=== The Misfits ===
- Static Age (1978)
- 12 Hits from Hell (1980)
- Walk Among Us (1982)
- Earth A.D./Wolfs Blood (1983)
- Evilive (1983)
- Legacy of Brutality (1985)
- Misfits (1986)
- Collection II (1995)
- American Psycho (1997)
- Evilive II (1998)
- Famous Monsters (1999)
- Cuts from the Crypt (2001)
- Project 1950 (2003)
- The Devil's Rain (2011)
- Dead Alive! (2013)
- Vampire Girl (2015)
- Friday the 13th (EP) (2016)

=== Kryst the Conqueror ===
- Deliver Us from Evil (1989)

=== Osaka Popstar ===
- Osaka Popstar and the American Legends of Punk (2006)

=== Solo ===
- Anti-Hero (2022)

== Filmography ==
- Vampira: The Movie (2006)
- KISS Loves You (2004)
- Fans and Freaks: The Culture of Comics and Conventions (2002)
- Campfire Stories (2001)
- The Big Brother Video: Crap (2001)
- Bruiser (2000)
- Big Money Hustlas (1999)
- Animal Room (1995)

TV

- Biography (2010)
- The X Show (2000)
- Mayhem (1999)
- WCW Monday Nitro (1999)
