= Famous Monsters =

Studio album by the Misfits
- Released: October 5, 1999
- Recorded: 12 April - 9 June 1999
- Studios: Dreamland Recording Studios - Hurley, NY
- Genres: Horror punk; heavy metal; hardcore punk
- Length: 44:42
- Label: Roadrunner
- Producers: Daniel Rey, Ed Stasium

Misfits chronology
Evillive II (1998)	Famous Monsters (1999)	Cuts from the Crypt (2001)

Singles from Famous Monsters
- 1. "Scream!" Released: September 1999

Famous Monsters is the fifth studio album by the American punk rock band Misfits, released on October 5, 1999. It is the second in the post-Danzig era of the band, and the last album to feature Michale Graves, Dr. Chud and Doyle Wolfgang von Frankenstein who would quit the band in 2000 and 2001 respectively.

== Album information ==
The album's title is an allusion to the horror/sci-fi magazine Famous Monsters of Filmland, from whom the Misfits borrow their classic logo font. The UK release also exclusively includes the song "1,000,000 Years BC", which was later re-released on Cuts from the Crypt in 2001.

The song "Scream!" was turned into a music video directed by George A. Romero. In addition, the band appeared in Romero's film Bruiser. "Kong at the Gates" was the theme music for WCW alumnus Vampiro.

The song "Descending Angel" was re-recorded and released as a single in 2013, with Jerry Only on lead vocals.

The song "Helena" is based on the film Boxing Helena.

== Reception ==
Professional ratings
Review scores
Source	Rating
AllMusic	2.5/5 stars
Collector's Guide to Heavy Metal	7/10
Kerrang!	3/5 stars

- CMJ (10/18/99, p. 36) – "treads familiar Misfits territory...this classic band shows why it's one of the most revered names in punk rock."

== Track listing ==
All tracks are written by the Misfits (Michale Graves, Jerry Only, Doyle Wolfgang von Frankenstein, and Dr. Chud), except where noted

No.	Title	Length
1.	"Kong at the Gates (Instrumental) (based on King Kong)"	1:22
2.	"The Forbidden Zone (based on Planet of the Apes)"	2:23
3.	"Lost in Space (based on Lost in Space)"	2:27
4.	"Dust to Dust (based on The Bride of Frankenstein)" (Misfits, Daniel Rey)	2:43
5.	"Crawling Eye (based on The Trollenberg Terror)"	2:22
6.	"Witch Hunt"	1:31
7.	"Scream!"	2:33
8.	"Saturday Night"	3:28
9.	"Pumpkin Head (based on Pumpkinhead)" (Contains line of "Pumpkinhead", written by Ed Justin)	2:16
10.	"Scarecrow Man"	3:10
11.	"Die Monster Die"	2:00
12.	"Living Hell" (Misfits, Rey)	2:54
13.	"Descending Angel" (Misfits, Rey)	3:46
14.	"Them (based on Them!)"	2:43
15.	"Fiend Club"	2:52
16.	"Hunting Humans (based on Night of the Living Dead)" (Misfits, Rey)	2:06
17.	"Helena (based on Boxing Helena)"	3:20
18.	"Kong Unleashed (Instrumental) (based on King Kong)"	0:46
Total length:		44:42

European and Japanese edition bonus tracks
No.	Title	Writer(s)	Length
19.	"Devil Doll"	Doyle, Graves	3:12
20.	"1,000,000 Years B.C."	Only	2:22
21.	"Helena 2"	Graves, Doyle	3:21
Total length:			53:37

== Personnel ==
- Michale Graves – vocals
- Doyle Wolfgang Von Frankenstein – guitars
- Jerry Only – bass
- Dr. Chud – drums

== Charts ==
1999 chart performance for Famous Monsters
Chart (1999)	Peak position
UK Rock & Metal Albums (Official Charts)	6
US Billboard 200	138

2026 chart performance for Famous Monsters
Chart (2026)	Peak position
Hungarian Physical Albums (MAHASZ)	37
Scottish Albums (Official Charts)	43
UK Albums Sales (OCC)	58
UK Rock & Metal Albums (Official Charts)	4
