= Science Fiction/Double Feature =

Song by Richard O'Brien

from the album The Rocky Horror Picture Show: Music From The Motion Picture
- Released: 1975
- Recorded: London
- Genre: Glam rock
- Label: Ode
- Composers: Richard O'Brien; Richard Hartley
- Lyricist: Richard O'Brien
- Producer: Lou Adler

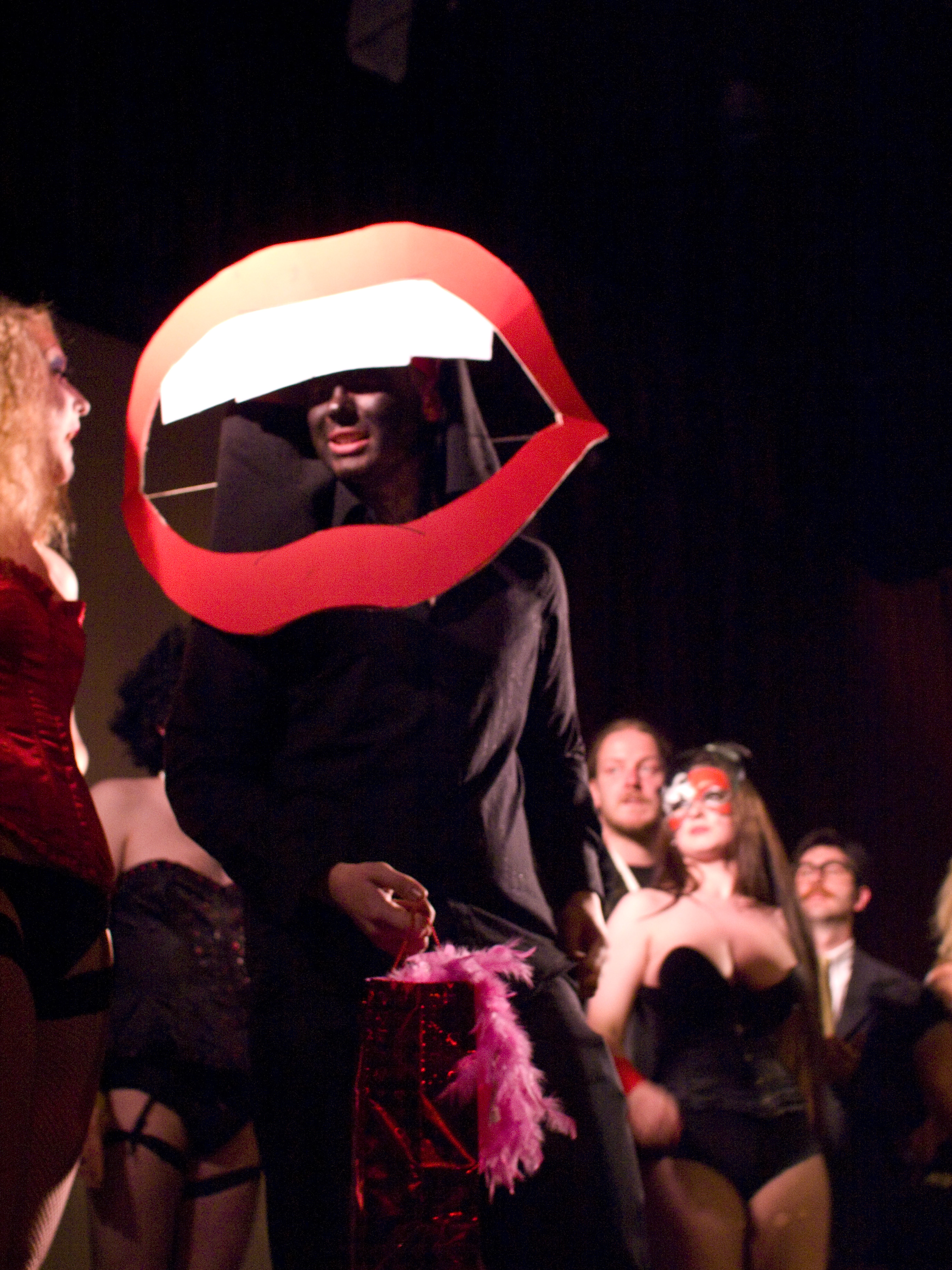
The iconic opening lips at a Dublin, Ireland shadow cast of Rocky Horror in 2009

"Science Fiction/Double Feature" is the opening song to the original 1973 musical stage production, The Rocky Horror Show as well as its 1975 film counterpart The Rocky Horror Picture Show, book, music and lyrics by Richard O'Brien, musical arrangements by Richard Hartley. The song is reprised at the end of the show, with lyrics that reflect on the final events of the story.

The song is a tribute to and sendup of various science fiction B movies and serials. These are also parodied in the show itself.

== Overview ==
The 1975 film The Rocky Horror Picture Show opens with a title sequence of a disembodied mouth against a black background singing in homage to classic science fiction films. (The image holds inspired impact of both the immobile lips fixed in a Mona Lisa smile in Man Ray's surreal painting A l'heure de l'observatoire, les Amoureux, and Samuel Beckett's active isolated mouth in his theatre work Not I). The song is performed by composer/writer Richard O'Brien (who portrayed Riff-Raff) and lip synced, as the now-iconic pair of red lips, by co-star Patricia Quinn (who played Magenta). Quinn's head had to be strapped to a board to keep it stationary while filming.

In its original 1973 stage incarnation The Rocky Horror Show, the song is performed by the character Magenta doubling as the credited role of "Usherette". This character took on the unofficial names of "Miss Strawberry Time", "Trixie" and the "Belasco Popcorn Girl" from props carried onstage during the number.

The song's lyrics are composed of fragments from 1950s subgenre horror and science fiction films, and likened to that of avant-garde artist Tristan Tzara by author Vera Dika in her book, Recycled Culture in Contemporary Art and Film. Tzara would construct poems by taking snippets of words from newspapers and placing them into a bag to randomly draw from and arrange. Instead, the words in "Science Fiction/Double Feature" are purposely made to rhyme with a set structure and set with phrases that create cohesion.

The original concept for the feature film as indicated in the original script was to have clips of each film shown with a scratched aged effect overlay during the song and opening credits. This was scrapped when it became apparent that the cost of acquiring the rights to these clips in 1974 was far too prohibitive.

The song is in the key of A major, and the end reprise is in the key of B♭ major.

== Musical number ==
In the original stage version, the prologue of the show features the usherette (usually played by the same actor as Magenta) singing "Science Fiction/Double Feature" as she enters after the theater lighting has been dimmed. A spotlight follows her as she carries her refreshment tray down the aisle and onto the stage.

In the film version, production designer Brian Thomson decided to use Patricia Quinn's lipsticked mouth against a black background, lip syncing to Richard O'Brien's vocal. Inspired by the Man Ray painting entitled A l'heure de l'observatoire, les Amoureux (1966), the opening number (prologue) is sung by these disembodied lips that freeze in place for the credits. The prologue was originally going to feature shots from the films referenced in the song under the opening credits.

The 2016 television version The Rocky Horror Picture Show: Let's Do the Time Warp Again includes a framing sequence of a movie audience watching the film. The song is sung by the usherette (definitively named Trixie, and played by Ivy Levan), who sings the song as she seats audience members.

== References in song ==
Below is a list of the actors, films and novels referenced in the song, listed in order of their appearance in the lyrics.

- Michael Rennie
- The Day the Earth Stood Still (1951)
- Flash Gordon
- Claude Rains
- The Invisible Man (1933)
- Fay Wray
- King Kong (1933)
- It Came from Outer Space (1953)
- Doctor X (1932)
- Anne Francis
- Forbidden Planet (1956)
- Leo G. Carroll
- Tarantula! (1955)
- Janette Scott
- The Day of the Triffids (1963)
- Dana Andrews
- Night of the Demon (1957)
- When Worlds Collide (1951)
- George Pal
- RKO Pictures

Additionally, the chorus makes a meta-reference to Rocky Horror characters "Brad and Janet" in the context of the audience seeing "androids fighting".
