= Misfits (band) =

American punk band

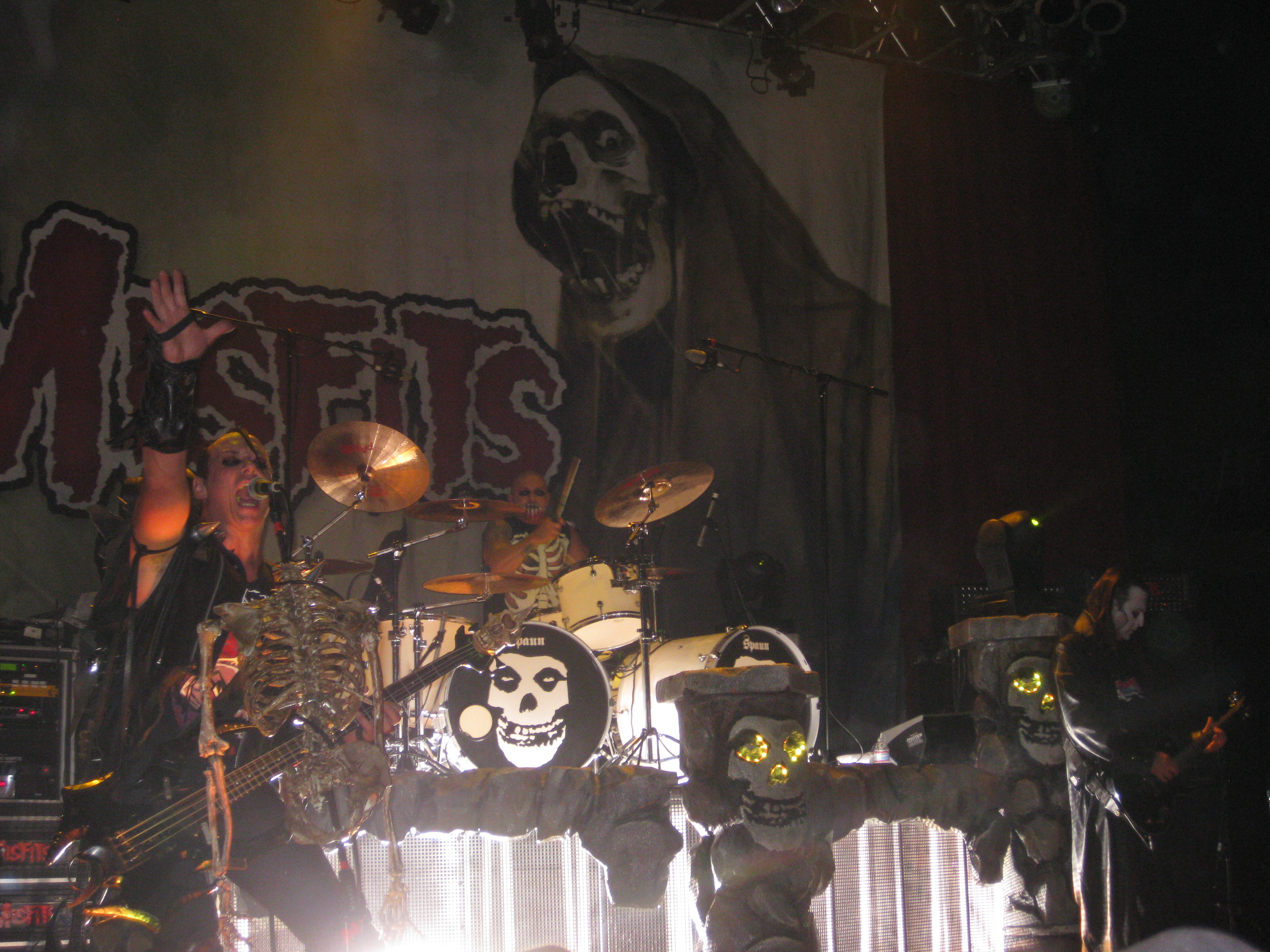
- The Misfits performing live in 2012

Background information
- Also known as: The Original Misfits (2016–present)
- Origin: Lodi, New Jersey, U.S.
- Genres: Horror punk; hardcore punk; punk rock
- Works: Discography
- Years active: 1977–1983; 1995–present
- Labels: Plan 9/Blank; Slash; Caroline; Geffen; Roadrunner; Misfits
- Spinoffs: Samhain; Kryst the Conqueror
- Members: Glenn Danzig; Jerry Only; Doyle Wolfgang von Frankenstein; Dave Lombardo; Acey Slade
- Past members: Mr. Jim; Jimi Battle; Diane DiPiazza; Manny Martínez; Franché Coma; Bobby Steele; Joey Image; Arthur Googy; Robo; Brian "Damage" Keats; Dr. Chud; Michale Graves; Myke Hideous; Marky Ramone; Dez Cadena; Chupacabra; Jerry Other; Marc Rizzo
- Website: misfits.com

The Misfits are an American punk rock band, often recognized as pioneers of the horror punk subgenre, blending punk and other musical influences with horror film themes and imagery. The group was formed in 1977 in Lodi, New Jersey, by vocalist, songwriter, and keyboardist Glenn Danzig. Shortly after, bassist Jerry Only joined, and the pair remained the core members through numerous personnel changes over the next six years. During this period, they released several EPs and singles, and with Only's brother Doyle on guitar, the albums Walk Among Us (1982) and Earth A.D./Wolfs Blood (1983) were released—both considered touchstones of the early 1980s hardcore punk movement. Over the years, the band has undergone many lineup changes, with Jerry Only serving as the group’s only constant member.

The Misfits disbanded in 1983, and Glenn Danzig went on to form Samhain and then Danzig. Several albums of reissued and previously unreleased material were issued after the group's dissolution, and their music became influential to the subsequent punk rock, heavy metal, hard rock, and alternative rock scenes. After a series of legal battles with Danzig, Only and Doyle regained the rights to record and perform as the Misfits. They formed a new version of the band in 1995 with singer Michale Graves and drummer Dr. Chud. This incarnation of Misfits had more of a heavy metal sound, and released the albums American Psycho (1997) and Famous Monsters (1999) before dissolving in 2000. Jerry Only then took over lead vocals and recruited former Black Flag guitarist Dez Cadena and former Ramones drummer Marky Ramone for a Misfits 25th anniversary tour.

This lineup released an album of cover songs in 2003, titled Project 1950, and toured for several years. In 2005, Marky was replaced by Robo, who had previously drummed for the Misfits (1982–1983) and Black Flag. This lineup released a single titled "Land of the Dead" in 2009. The Misfits' lineup of Only, Cadena, and drummer Eric "Chupacabra" Arce released a new album, The Devil's Rain, in October 2011. In 2015, Cadena announced he would be taking a break from music after receiving a cancer diagnosis and was replaced by Only's son, Jerry Caiafa III (stage name Jerry Other). That same year, Soulfly's Marc Rizzo joined the band on guitar, temporarily filling in for Cadena before Caiafa became the sole guitarist.

In September 2016, for the first time in 33 years, Danzig, Only, and Doyle reunited for two headlining shows as the Original Misfits at that year's edition of Riot Fest, along with drummer Dave Lombardo and second guitarist Acey Slade. The Original Misfits lineup has continued performing sporadically.

== History ==
=== 1977–1978: Formation and Static Age ===
The Misfits were formed in February 1977 in Lodi, New Jersey, by Glenn Danzig, who had previous experience performing in local cover bands. The band was named after actress Marilyn Monroe's final film, The Misfits (1961). Danzig's first recruits to the Misfits were drummer Mr. Jim and bassist Diane DiPiazza, however, DiPiazza never showed up. Mr. Jim was replaced by Manny Martinez shortly after. The two practiced in Martínez's garage, with Danzig on electric piano and Martínez on drums. The duo soon encountered Jerry Caiafa, who was dating a neighbor of Martínez's and had just received a bass guitar for Christmas. Although he was still new to the instrument, he joined the band; Caiafa and Danzig would remain the only consistent members of the Misfits until the group's dissolution in 1983.

Danzig, Martínez, and Caiafa rehearsed for three months without a guitarist, using Danzig's electric piano to provide the rhythm for the songs. The band played their first performance at CBGB in New York City in April 1977, followed by other local performances over the following months. In May that year, they recorded their first single, Cough/Cool, which they released through their own label Blank Records that August. Caiafa's surname was misspelled on the sleeve of the record, prompting him to insist that, in the future, he be credited as "Jerry, only Jerry". "Jerry Only" became his pseudonym for the rest of his career.

In August 1977, guitarist Frank Licata joined the band under the pseudonym Franché Coma, allowing Danzig to phase out the electric piano and focus on singing while pushing the band's sound in a punk rock direction. Danzig and Only deemed Martínez unreliable and replaced by Mr. Jim. The band found a recording opportunity when Mercury Records sought to use the name Blank Records for one of its subsidiaries and offered Danzig 30 hours of studio time in exchange for the rights to the name. Danzig accepted, and in January 1978, the Misfits entered a New York recording studio to record 17 songs, 14 of which were mixed for the proposed Static Age album. The band were unable to find a record label interested in releasing it, so they released four of the songs in June 1978 as the Bullet single on their own label Plan 9 Records, named after the 1959 science fiction horror film Plan 9 from Outer Space. The other songs would see release on various compilation albums throughout the 1980s and 90s, but Static Age was not released in its entirety until 1996.

=== 1978–1981: Singles and early tours ===
Following the Static Age sessions, the Misfits began a shift in songwriting and appearance, with Danzig writing more songs inspired by B horror and science fiction films. He painted skeletal patterns on his performance clothing, while Only began applying dark makeup around his eyes and styling his hair in a long point hanging from his forehead between his eyes and down to his chin, a style that became known as a "devilock" and which both Danzig and Only's brother Doyle would eventually adopt. This new style and musical direction would later be described as the subgenre "horror punk".

The band performed more frequently and embarked on short tours in support of the Bullet single. While in Canada in October 1978 Coma quit the band because he did not enjoy touring, and guitarist Rick Riley filled in temporarily to finish the tour. Mr. Jim also quit following the tour, citing a distaste for the horror direction in which the band was heading. Within two months the pair were replaced by drummer Joey Poole, under the pseudonym Joey Image, and guitarist Robert Kaufhold, also known as Bobby Steele. The new lineup of Danzig, Only, Image, and Steele began performing in December 1978 and continued to evolve the horror elements of the band. They released the Horror Business single in June 1979, the cover of which featured a skeletal figure inspired by a poster for the 1946 film serial The Crimson Ghost.

The figure became a mascot for the band, and its skull image would serve as the Misfits' logo for the rest of their career. The band also launched a fan club named the "Fiend Club" which Danzig operated in a do-it-yourself fashion from his mother's basement in Lodi, silkscreening T-shirts, assembling records, mailing merchandise catalogs, booking shows for the band, and answering fan mail.

In June 1979, the Misfits performed as openers for The Damned in New York City. Only spoke with singer Dave Vanian about the possibility of the Misfits touring the United Kingdom with The Damned. That November the band released the Night of the Living Dead single and flew to England to tour with The Damned. Upon arriving there, however, they learned that Vanian had not taken his conversation with Only seriously and had not planned on having the Misfits on the tour. Vanian attempted to arrange for the Misfits to take part in the tour, but the band members were unhappy with the situation and left the tour after only two shows. Image then quit the band and flew back to the United States. With their return flight not scheduled until late December, the remaining band members stayed in London. Only spent time with Sid Vicious' mother, Anne Ritchie, whom he had befriended after Vicious' death in February 1979. Danzig and Steele got into a fight with skinheads while waiting to see The Jam, were arrested, and spent two nights in jail in Brixton. This experience inspired the later song "London Dungeon". Although in an interview on podcast San Clemente Punk, Bobby Steele tells a completely different version of the events.

Upon their return to the United States the Misfits released the Beware EP in January 1980, then took a four-month break before adding Arthur McGuckin as their new drummer under the pseudonym Arthur Googy. During this time Only's younger brother Paul Caiafa, a longtime fan of the band who went by the nickname Doyle, began learning to play guitar with help from Danzig and Only. The Misfits began working on an album which they planned to release through their Plan 9 label, recording twelve songs in a studio in August 1980. Doyle practiced with the band and loaned the band his gear for recording. That October Steele was ejected from the band, when Steele no-showed a scheduled recording session, in favor of the sixteen-year-old Doyle. Steele went on to form The Undead, while Doyle made his debut with the Misfits at their annual Halloween performance at Irving Plaza in New York City. After several more performances, the band took another hiatus for six months.

After reconvening, the band selected three of the twelve songs from their August 1980 album sessions and released them as 3 Hits From Hell in April 1981. Throughout the rest of 1981 they continued to record tracks for a full-length album, to be titled Walk Among Us. They had planned to release it through Plan 9 but instead accepted an offer from Slash Records, deciding to rework the album before its release. In October 1981 they released two more tracks from the August 1980 sessions as the Halloween single. On November 20 they recorded a performance at Broadway in San Francisco.

Black Flag were also performing that night at the Mabuhay Gardens downstairs on Broadway, and Black Flag singer Henry Rollins, a longtime fan of the band, came up to watch the Misfits' soundcheck. He stayed to watch the band's set and sang guest vocals on "We Are 138". The two bands crossed paths again on Christmas in Lodi, where Black Flag wound up playing as the opening band for the Necros and the Misfits.

=== 1982–1983: Albums and dissolution ===
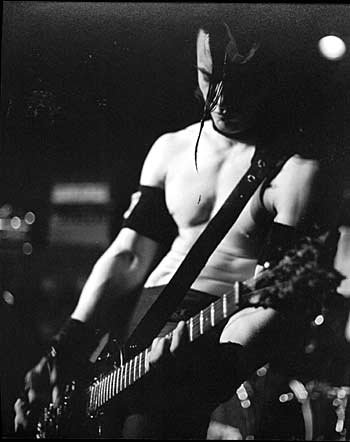
Doyle performing with the Misfits at the Wilson Center in Washington, D.C. in 1982

Walk Among Us was released in March 1982 through Ruby and Slash Records. It was the first full-length Misfits album to be properly released, and the only album to be released while the early incarnation of the band was still active. A national tour in support of the album followed in the spring, and the band's performances began to grow more intense and violent. Danzig and Googy clashed frequently during the tour, and after a heated argument at a McDonald's restaurant Danzig kicked Googy out of the band, delaying their plans to record their next EP. They offered the vacant drummer position to their friend Eerie Von, who had served as their occasional roadie and photographer, but he had already committed to drumming for Rosemary's Babies. Henry Rollins recommended former Black Flag drummer Robo, who flew to New Jersey to join the Misfits in July 1982. Doyle graduated from high school and he and Only began working full-time at their father's machine shop, earning money to purchase new instruments, fund the band's tours, and press records, while Danzig ran the Fiend Club and continued writing new songs.

In September 1982 the Misfits embarked on a national tour billed as the "Evilive tour", with the Necros as their opening act. During the tour they stopped at a studio to record the instrumental tracks for their next EP. They were arrested in New Orleans on charges of grave robbing while attempting to locate the grave of voodoo practitioner Marie Laveau, but bailed themselves out of jail and skipped their court date to drive to their next performance in Florida. Following the tour they released seven songs from the November 1981 performance in San Francisco in limited numbers only to members of the Fiend Club as the Evilive EP.

By this time Danzig was growing increasingly dissatisfied with the Misfits and had begun writing songs for a new band project. In June 1983, he confided to Henry Rollins that he planned to quit the group. In early 1983, the Misfits embarked on the "Earth A.D." US tour. In July the Misfits finished recording their EP, and Danzig decided to record two more songs that he had intended for his new project, turning it into a full album. Earth A.D./Wolfs Blood demonstrated the increased influence of hardcore punk and heavy metal on the band, though they would break up just two months before it was released. After a series of arguments with Danzig, Robo left the band in August and Danzig became further disenchanted, beginning to audition musicians for his next project.

On October 29, 1983, the Misfits played their annual Halloween performance at Greystone Hall in Detroit with the Necros. Danzig had selected Brian Damage (real name Brian Keats), formerly of Genöcide and Verbal Abuse, as the band's new drummer. However, Damage became drunk before the show and could not play properly. After several songs Doyle escorted him off the stage and Todd Swalla of The Necros filled in for the remainder of the performance. Tensions came to a head and Danzig announced to the audience that it would be the band's final show. Upon returning to Lodi the band members went their separate ways. A farewell three song single, "Die Die My Darling," was issued in 1984.

=== 1984–1995: New projects and legal battles ===
Following the breakup of the Misfits, Danzig launched his new band Samhain, moving away from punk rock, and toward more experimental heavy metal with a grim atmosphere. Several Misfits songs were rerecorded for Samhain albums, including "Horror Business" (as "Horror Biz"), "All Hell Breaks Loose" (as "All Hell"), and "Halloween II". In 1986, the band signed to a major record label and Danzig replaced most of the rhythm section, renaming the group Danzig. He continues to front Danzig, who have released ten albums ranging in style from blues rock-influenced heavy metal to industrial rock, and has also released two solo albums.

Jerry Only and Doyle, meanwhile, moved to Vernon, New Jersey to work at their father's machine parts factory full-time. Jerry Only had married and had a daughter and became more serious about his Christian faith, regretting some of the things he had done with the Misfits. In 1987, he and Doyle formed the short-lived Kryst the Conqueror, a Christian heavy metal band with barbarian imagery.

Although the Misfits' popularity did not extend beyond the underground punk scene during their six years of activity, public interest in the band increased in the years following their breakup. The success of Danzig's post-Misfits' work led to interest in his past work, and several high-profile rock bands professed fondness for the Misfits. Most notably, Metallica covered the Misfits songs "Last Caress" and "Green Hell" on The $5.98 E.P. - Garage Days Re-Revisited (1987), and Guns N' Roses covered "Attitude" on "The Spaghetti Incident?" (1993). Several albums of reissued and previously unreleased Misfits material were issued between 1985 and 1987, the first being the compilation album Legacy of Brutality (1985) which included many of the songs from the unreleased Static Age album. Danzig overdubbed many of the album's instrument tracks to avoid having to pay royalties to the other former band members. Misfits, more commonly referred to as Collection I, followed in 1986. The Evilive EP was reissued as a full album in 1987 with five additional tracks.

Only contacted Danzig about receiving a portion of the royalties from these albums' sales, beginning a legal battle that lasted several years and involved other past members of the band. All of the Misfits material had been credited to Danzig, and though Only later conceded that Danzig had written nearly all of the lyrics and most of the music, he contended that he and Doyle "wrote 25% or maybe 30% of the music" and deserved compensation. Danzig, however, insisted that he had written all of the songs in their entirety and that the other members' creative input had been minimal. Eventually Only ceased his pursuit of songwriting credits and sought the rights to use the Misfits name and imagery, including the now-famous "Crimson Ghost" skull face logo.

In 1995, the parties reached an out-of-court settlement that allowed Only and Doyle to record and perform as the Misfits, sharing merchandising rights with Danzig. Collection II, a third compilation of Misfits songs, was released later that year.

=== 1995–2000: Reformation and new lineup ===
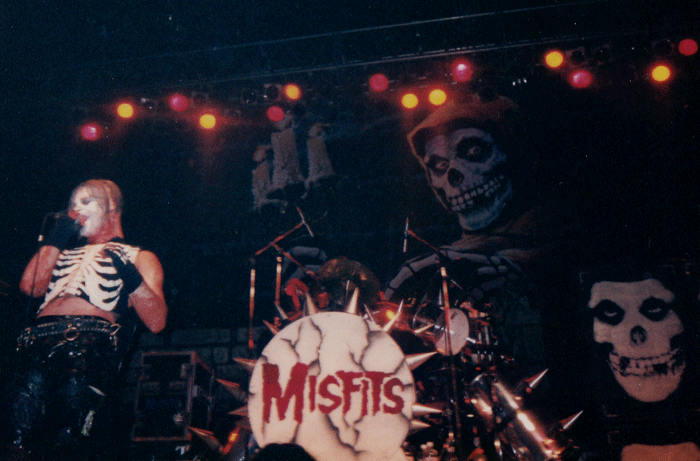
Misfits performing live in 1998

Only and Doyle immediately set about reforming the Misfits, bringing in drummer David Calabrese, also known as Dr. Chud, who had worked with them in Kryst the Conqueror. Glenn Danzig refused to return as the band's lead singer. Dave Vanian of The Damned was also approached but declined. The band, now reformed with one original founding member, Jerry Only, held open auditions for a new vocalist. Nineteen-year-old singer Michael Emanuel had recently recorded a demo tape in hopes of starting a music career, and the owner of the recording studio suggested that he audition for the Misfits. Being unfamiliar with the band, Emanuel listened to Collection I on a walkman to learn the lyrics and melodies while working his job as a greenskeeper. He impressed the band with his audition and was accepted as the new lead singer under the pseudonym Michale Graves, while Doyle adopted the new stage full name Doyle Wolfgang von Frankenstein. The new lineup made an appearance in the 1995 film Animal Room. On October 31, 1995, the band played a surprise show at the Chance Theatre in Poughkeepsie, New York with Type O Negative.

In March 1996, the band embarked on their official comeback tour in Europe with English Dogs and Sardonica opening. Sardonica also opened for the group during their East Coast tour during the Spring. During the summer of that year the Misfits headlined the Resurrection tour with the opening acts consisting of Anthrax, Cannibal Corpse and Life of Agony.

In 1996, The Misfits coffin box set was released, containing nearly all of the band's Danzig-era material recorded from 1977 to 1983 (with the exception of Walk Among Us). The set included the incomplete fourteen-song Static Age album, released for the first time in its entirety on CD, as well as the overdubbed and alternate versions of songs that had previously been released on Legacy of Brutality, Collection I, and Collection II. Static Age was also released as a separate album the following year, including all seventeen tracks that had been recorded during the January 1978 sessions. The release of the box set and Static Age made the Misfits' complete early catalog widely available for the first time.

A tribute album was also released in 1997 titled Violent World: A Tribute to the Misfits, featuring numerous punk rock and hardcore bands covering their songs. Another tribute album, Hell on Earth: A Tribute to the Misfits, was released in 2000 featuring death metal, hard rock, and gothic rock acts.

The new incarnation of the Misfits released their debut album American Psycho in 1997, it became the band's first album to reach the Billboard 200 peaking at number 117. They filmed music videos for the songs "American Psycho" and "Dig Up Her Bones". The band then embarked on the "American Psycho" world tour tour which had multiple legs in Asia, Australia, Europe, along with North and South America they also supported Megadeth on the North American leg of their Cryptic Writings tour. In total the American Psycho tour lasted from April 15, 1997 to July 30, 1998. They also appeared as characters in World Championship Wrestling as tag team for wrestler Ian "Vampiro" Hodgkinson.

Graves took a hiatus from the band in 1998, during which Myke Itzazone of Empire Hideous filled in as singer during tours of South America and Europe. After Graves' return the band signed to Roadrunner Records, releasing Famous Monsters in October 1999 which debuted at number 138 on the Billboard 200. They filmed a music video for the single Scream!. The "Famous Monsters" tour began in June 1999, starting in Europe the North American leg was supported by Earth Crisis. In August the group opened three shows for Marylin Manson, then holding a Halloween tour throughout October with GWAR and Murphy's Law opening. They made additional film appearances in Big Money Hustlas (2000), Bruiser (2000), and Campfire Stories (2001) and continued to tour in support of Famous Monsters until October 2000, but tensions between the band members began to grow. During a performance at the House of Blues in Orlando, Florida on October 25, 2000, Graves and Chud both quit the band and walked off stage. The two later released an album under the name Graves before splitting up; Graves went on to sing for Gotham Road and then launched a solo career, while Chud formed Dr. Chud's X-Ward. Meanwhile, Doyle took an indefinite hiatus from performing as he divorced, remarried, had a fourth child, and dealt with tendonitis in his elbow. Following Graves' and Dr. Chud's departure, Ignite vocalist Zoli Téglás filled in for the band's remaining tour dates and both Renfield and Matt Cross filled in on drums.

=== 2001–2008: 25th anniversary and all-star lineup ===
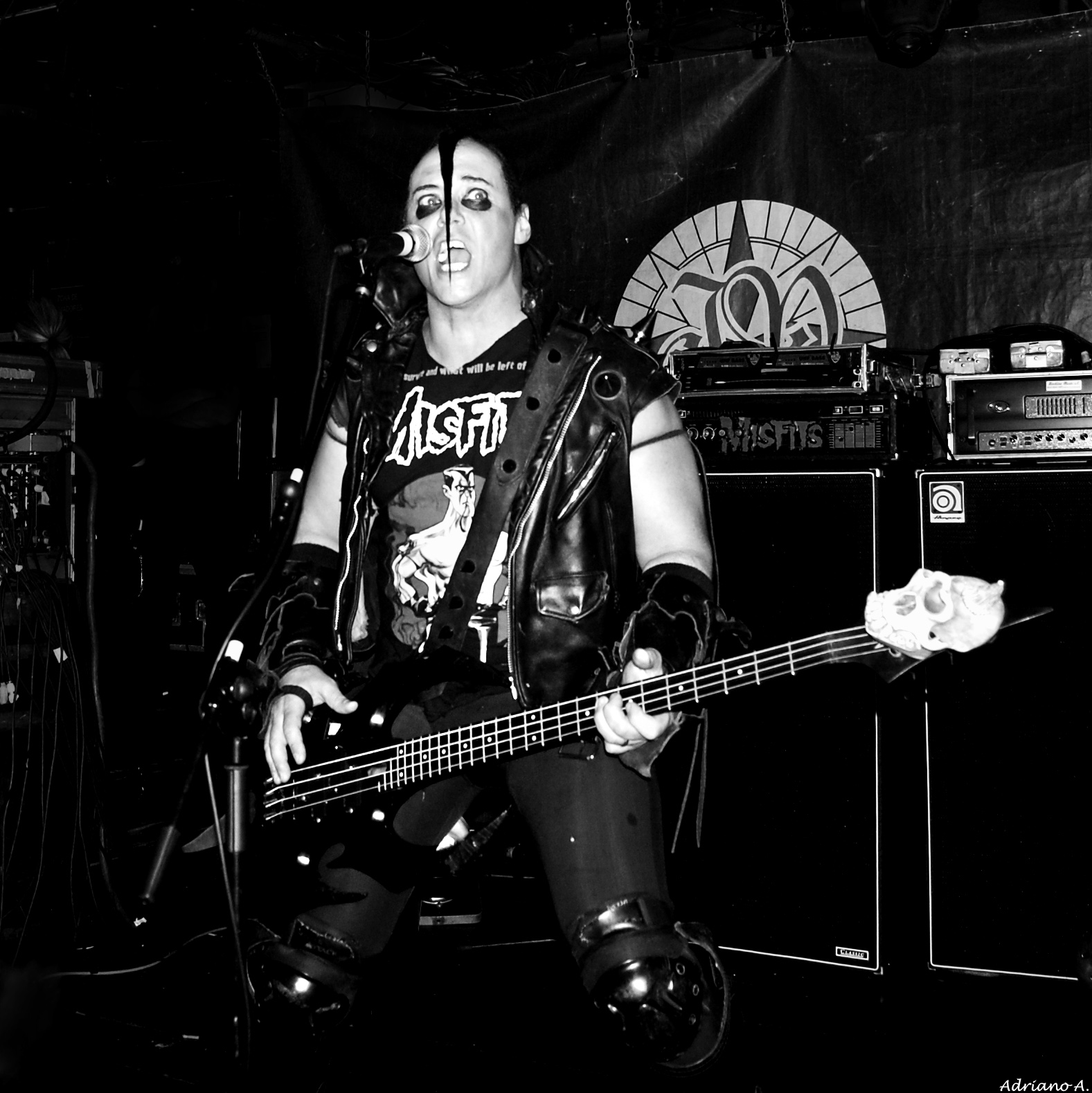
After the departure of the other band members, bassist Jerry Only took over as singer and recruited veteran punk rock musicians to continue the band.

As the sole remaining founding member of the Misfits, Jerry Only took over lead vocal duties in addition to playing bass guitar and recruited veteran musicians Dez Cadena, former guitarist and vocalist for Black Flag, an idea Doyle was not fond of, leading him to quit. Also Marky Ramone, former drummer of the Ramones, joined for a Misfits 25th anniversary tour which lasted intermittently for nearly three years. Former Black Flag and Misfits drummer Robo filled in for Ramone during some stretches of the tour. Only released Cuts from the Crypt in 2001, a compilation of demos and rarities covering the band's period with Graves and Chud from 1995 to 2001. This fulfilled the band's contractual obligations to Roadrunner Records, whom Only had grown dissatisfied with.

Also in 2001 Caroline Records announced that they would release recordings from the Misfits' August 1980 album sessions as 12 Hits from Hell. However, both Only and Glenn Danzig abruptly called off production of the album, citing concerns with the mixing, mastering, layout, and packaging.

Only and longtime collaborator John Cafiero soon launched their own label, Misfits Records, and released a split single featuring the Misfits and Japanese horror punk band Balzac. The Only/Cadena/Ramone lineup of the Misfits released the covers album Project 1950 in 2003, performing renditions of classic rock and roll songs from the 1950s and 1960s. The album featured guest appearances from Ronnie Spector, Jimmy Destri, Ed Manion, and John Cafiero. The band toured intermittently in support of the album until 2005, when Ramone left the band and was replaced by Robo. They booked a full European tour that year, but problems with Robo's visa led to the cancellation of all dates in the United Kingdom. A rescheduled UK tour followed in September.

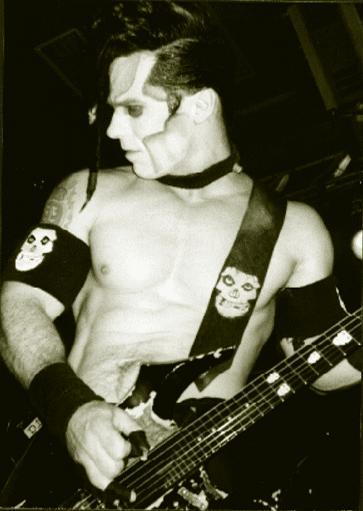
Starting in 2004, Doyle joined Danzig onstage to perform half-hour sets of early Misfits songs.

Doyle had meanwhile reunited with Glenn Danzig, joining Danzig onstage during performances in December 2004 to play guitar for 30-minute sets of old Misfits songs midway through the band's setlist. It was the first time the two had performed together in over twenty years, and the first time Doyle had performed since his hiatus. Danzig called the performances "the closest thing to a Misfits reunion anyone is ever going to see". These sets featuring Doyle continued through Danzig's 2005 Blackest of the Black tour and 2006 Australian tour. Glenn Danzig had announced his intention to retire from touring following these, though he later contradicted this by announcing a Danzig 20th anniversary tour in 2008. In 2007, he produced Doyle's new project Gorgeous Frankenstein. Doyle later indicated that plans had been in place for the Misfits to reunite with Glenn Danzig beginning in 2002, but that Jerry Only and his manager had "put a fuckin' monkey wrench in it."

In Fall 2007, the Misfits embarked on their 30th anniversary tour with dates in Europe and North America. In 2008, the band were scheduled to take part in the Volcom tour headlined by Motörhead however they dropped off the bill.

=== 2009–2015: 30th anniversary and new albums ===
In 2009 and 2010, the Misfits performed an extended 30th anniversary world tour. A new single, "Land of the Dead" was released October 27, 2009, marking the band's first release of new studio material in six years and the only release by the lineup of Only, Cadena, and Robo. Robo was dismissed from the band in 2010, with Only explaining that ongoing problems with his Colombian passport inhibited the band's ability to tour consistently. He was replaced by Eric "Chupacabra" Arce of Murphy's Law, who had previously filled in with the band for tours in 2000 and 2001. The Only/Cadena/Arce lineup released a new album, The Devil's Rain, recorded with producer Ed Stasium and titled after the 1975 film starring William Shatner. The album was released on October 4, 2011 debuting at number 70 on the Billboard 200 with 6,000 copies sold in the first week. They toured in support of the album throughout the fall. During the latter quarter of 2011, former vocalist Danzig and guitarist Doyle performed Misfits songs on four occasions as part of the Danzig Legacy tour. The first of the four shows, which took place on October 7 in Chicago, saw a sold-out crowd. In the fall of 2012, the Misfits toured the US.

In 2013, the Misfits released their third live album, Dead Alive!. In October, they released a 12" single fronted by a new recording of "Descending Angel", backed by a cover of "Science Fiction/Double Feature", a song they previously only played live. Meanwhile, Danzig and Doyle continued to regularly play Misfits songs and included a set on Danzig's 25th anniversary tour. In October 2013, publisher Rowman & Littlefield published This Music Leaves Stains by James Greene, an unofficial Misfits biography, which tells the story of each incarnation of the band as well as spin-off projects such as Samhain and Danzig. In late 2014, they embarked on a US headlining tour. Guitarist Dez Cadena left the band in 2015, Jerry Jr. the son of Jerry Only served as his replacement on guitar during the band's US tour later that year. This new lineup released the songs "Vampire Girl" and "Zombie Girl" as a single that same year.

=== 2016–present: Reunion as the Original Misfits ===
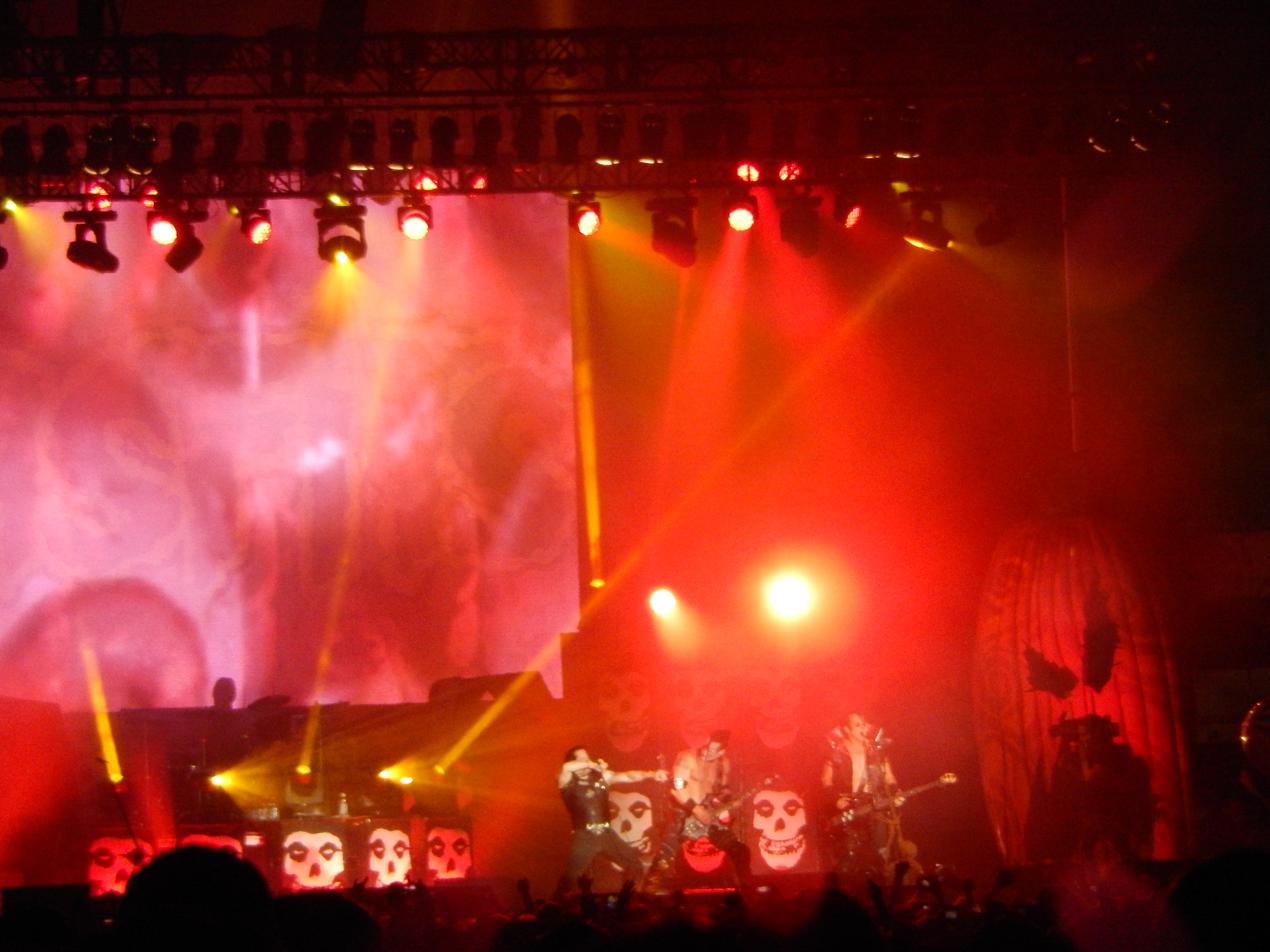
The original Misfits performing at Riot Fest in 2016

In May 2016, Danzig, Only, and Doyle announced that they would perform together for the first time in 33 years, under the name The Original Misfits. Only told Rolling Stone that the reunion stemmed from a legal discussion that "was turning into another court battle and it turned into a reunion." Court documents show that Danzig and Only discussed a reunion as part of settlement negotiations as early as 2014. In June of that year, the Misfits released the Friday the 13th EP featuring material written by Only with his son Jerry Other on guitar and Chupacabra on drums. In September the Misfits lineup of Danzig, Only and Doyle, along with guitarist Acey Slade and drummer Dave Lombardo, headlined their two reunion shows, performing 25-song sets at the Riot Fest in Chicago and Denver.

In an interview with Rolling Stone following the first reunion show Only was asked and about plans to continue and possibly record new music. He said: "I want it to continue. I know Doyle wants it to continue. I know Glenn wants it to continue." But Only also said there were possible challenges, such other professional commitments and new members adjusting to the band's evolving musical style. When asked if Danzig would want to record new music Only said, "I think it's got to evolve naturally."

In December 2017, the reunited lineup performed two concerts at the MGM Grand Garden Arena in Las Vegas and The Forum in Inglewood, California. In 2018, the band played at the Prudential Center in Newark, New Jersey and in 2019 at the Allstate Arena in suburban Chicago. In a June 2019 interview, Danzig indicated the reunion period might be drawing to a close, saying that, "We're not gonna do many more." The news from Danzig came on the heels of an in-depth article from MetalSucks analyzing legal documents related to the original reunion planning that revealed other details, including the statement, "The parties agree to perform no fewer than ten Misfits reunion shows to coincide with the 40th anniversary of the band." Despite Danzig's pessimism, it was announced that same month that the Original Misfits would be replacing Megadeth at the Psycho Las Vegas event in August due to Dave Mustaine's throat cancer diagnosis. Following the Las Vegas show, the reunited lineup was booked for sold-out concerts at the Fiddler's Green Amphitheatre in Greenwood Village, Colorado, at the Oracle Arena in Oakland, at Seattle's White River Amphitheatre, at New York's Madison Square Garden, at Philadelphia's Wells Fargo Center and at Discovery Park in Sacramento.

In May 2021, it was announced that the Original Misfits would play Riot Fest as co-headliners with My Chemical Romance alongside Nine Inch Nails. They were also selected as a replacement headliner for My Chemical Romance at Aftershock Festival in October. In August 2022, they announced an Original Misfits lineup would perform its second headlining show of 2022 on Halloween weekend in Dallas, at Dos Equis Pavilion on October 29, with special guests Alice Cooper and FEAR.

During the summer 2023, the Misfits played three headlining shows with Megadeth, The Gaslight Anthem, FEAR and AFI serving as support. Original Misfits drummer Manny Martinez died on December 16, 2023, aged 69.

In 2024, the band headlined Sonic Temple, they also played a one-off show at the Moody Center in Austin, Texas with Suicidal Tendencies, Reverend Horton Heat, and Agnostic Front opening. In November 2024, it was announced that the Original Misfits would perform at Coachella on April 12 and April 19, 2025. The band was listed on the official tour poster with their original font logo.

== Artistry ==
=== Musical style ===
Each incarnation of the Misfits has made use of horror film and science fiction film-inspired themes and imagery, with makeup, clothing, artwork, and lyrics drawn from B movies and television serials, many from the 1950s through 1970s. Musically the band are often recognized as progenitors of the horror punk, psychobilly and punk metal subgenres and have drawn from punk rock, heavy metal, and 1950s rock and roll and rockabilly to inform their style. Rolling Stone describes them as "the archetypal horror-punk band of the late 1970s and early '80s", and they are considered icons in punk music and culture. The Misfits have also been described as pop-punk.

The early incarnations of the Misfits are associated with the hardcore punk movement of the early 1980s, though American Hardcore: A Tribal History author Steven Blush notes that "though crucial to the rise of hardcore, [they] were in fact in a league of their own...The Misfits delivered a hyper-yet-melodic assault based in 50/60s-style rock, taking the Buddy Holly/Gene Vincent foundation and making it nuclear." Jon de Rosa of Pitchfork Media describes how the band's sound was different from the punk rock coming out of New York at the time: "New York punk was just punk, simple and static. When Glenn started the Misfits, he mutated the punk sound and image into something darker and more sinister, a punk-metal hybrid that later found bloom in the quiet, boring suburbs of Oslo and the boggy backwaters surrounding Tampa. Punk belonged to the media/celebrity hubs of London and New York. Ghoul rock was for the kids in the suburbs where nothing ever happens".

Andy Weller of the Necros recalls the band's transition from traditional punk rock in the late 1970s to hardcore in the early 1980s: "(You) could hear it on the records. It went from this Ramones-type stuff, to nine months later, where they put out records that were so fast it's unreal." By the recording of Earth A.D./Wolfs Blood the band were playing faster, more aggressive material. According to Blush, "The Misfits' strengths as a hardcore group lay in non-[hardcore] attributes–melodic songs and larger-than-life-aura–but by the time of Earth AD Glenn was writing hyperspeed blasts that sounded very standard."

'Dig Up Her Bones' (1997)
Dig Up Her Bones, the single from American Psycho (1997)

The new version of the Misfits launched by Jerry Only and Doyle in the 1990s, kept the horror punk themes, but went in a more heavy metal direction with blasting drums and crunchy guitars. Reviewing American Psycho, Stephen Erlewine of AllMusic called the new incarnation "a kitschy goth-punk outfit that relies more on metal than hardcore", while Rolling Stone remarked that the band's new style blended "some old-style punk, a little metal and an occasional all-out thrasher." Greg Prato, reviewing the 2001 album Cuts from the Crypt, noted that "the latter-day Misfits are much more heavy metal based than in their earlier work – as their punk roots have all but been erased."

=== Devilock ===
The devilock is a hairstyle created by Misfits in the late 1970s. In a devilock, the sides and back of the hair are kept short, while the front is kept long and combed forward.

In an early 1980s interview, Jerry Only claimed that the devilock was based on a "tidal wave" hairstyle seen among the 1970s skateboarding communities. In the same interview, former Misfits vocalist Glenn Danzig explains that his version of the hairstyle developed from an imitation of Eddie Munster's hairstyle. A style similar to the Devilock was sported earlier - for instance the elephant trunk hairstyle of the 1950s, the Surfari's cover picture of 'Gum-dipped Slicks' (1964) shows a member of the band with a devilock-like quiff, as did the guitarist from the contemporaneous Tornadoes of Bustin' Surfboards fame.

=== Logo ===
The Misfits skull logo has been listed among the best band logos from publications such as Loudwire. The logo has been referred to as both "the fiend," and "the crimson ghost." Glenn Danzig took the image from the face of the titular ghoul character of the 1946 film The Crimson Ghost. It first appeared on their single "Horror Business" in 1979. Though Danzig had no idea the logo would become as iconic as it did, it fittingly represents everything that the band stands for, and so was adopted as the band's signature image.

In 2014, Glenn Danzig sued bassist Jerry Only for multiple violations, involving the misuse of Misfits trademarks and logos when Only had formed a new version of the Misfits without Danzig. The complaint included multiple references to Only's use of the skull. In August 2014, the judge dismissed the case in favor of Only, this case later led to the original Misfits reunion in 2016. In 2020, another lawsuit involving the logo was filed by the Misfits against Abrams Books, the publisher of the 2019 visual history book Scream With Me: The Enduring Legacy of the Misfits. However the lawsuit was reportedly dropped five months later.

== Legacy ==
Having been described as "the very model of an influential punk band" by Tim Stegall of Alternative Press, the Misfits have had a large influence on numerous bands in the punk and metal genres. Their album Earth A.D. has also been credited for having a large impact on both the death metal and hardcore genres. The Guardian also dubbed the Misfits the first pop-punk band stating "with their blending of super-catchy 50s rock’n’roll with the snarling aggression of hardcore making them one of punk’s greatest singalong bands." Acts such as Alkaline Trio, Destroy Boys, the Cryptkeeper Five, Murderdolls, Megadeth, Metallica, Guns N' Roses, Marilyn Manson, Green Day, the Offspring, NOFX, AFI, Avenged Sevenfold, My Chemical Romance and Cradle of Filth have also listed the band as an influence. Rolling Stone ranked their 1986 self titled compilation album as the 35th greatest punk album of all time, whilst Revolver ranked Walk Among Us the 9th greatest punk album. Their sound and logo which comes from the 1946 film The Crimson Ghost has also been described as "one of the most powerful sounds and images of the punk era."

Loudwire ranked Misfits the sixth greatest punk band of all time, and In 2021, the staff of Consequence ranked Misfits as the ninth greatest punk band of all time stating "Yet with songs about zombies, gore, and ghoulish imagery, Misfits integrated a sense of fantasy into the scene. They gave punk permission to be escapist and dark, and coupled this with catchy scores that bursted with snarl — a clear indicator that the quintessential punk attitude was never lost despite their different lyrical approach." In 2023 Ultimate Guitar listed the group among their 10 essential horror punk bands writing "The genre's OGs and arguably still the most successful act to come out of horror punk, even almost 50 years since their inception; The Misfits continue to embody everything great about this style."

Despite the band mostly remaining in the underground scene during their first era they were later able to gain a wider recognition by having their songs covered by bands such as Metallica and Guns N' Roses. Their songs have since regularly been covered by other metal and punk acts. While the Misfits mainly played club shows for most of their career, following the original lineup reunion in 2016, "they have since become the first 'old-school' American punk band to headline and sellout arenas", according to Forbes providing evidence that they are among the most popular punk bands ever. Another part of the band's legacy comes from their imagery and merchandise with The Guardian stating "they are firmly on the list of bands who have sold many more T-shirts than records." Throughout the years multiple action figures have been made of both the band members and their crimson ghost character.

Due to the limited quantities of the bands original singles and albums they have become a collectors item and have regularly sold for thousands of dollars and routinely appear on the most valuable lists on sites such as Discogs.

== Members ==
Current members

- Glenn Danzig – lead vocals (1977–1983, 2016–present), keyboards, guitars, drums (1977–1983)
- Jerry Only – bass guitar, backing vocals (1977–1983, 1995–present), lead vocals (2001–2016)
- Doyle Wolfgang von Frankenstein – lead guitar (1980–1983, 1995–2001, 2016–present)
- Dave Lombardo – drums (2016–present)
- Acey Slade – rhythm guitar, backing vocals (2016–present)

== Discography ==
Studio albums

- Walk Among Us (1982)
- Earth A.D./Wolfs Blood (1983)
- Static Age (1996)
- American Psycho (1997)
- Famous Monsters (1999)
- Project 1950 (2003)
- The Devil's Rain (2011)

== Filmography ==
The Misfits appeared as characters or in cameos in the following films:

- Walk Among You (1982), as Misfits.
- Love Hall (1982) as Misfits
- Animal Room (1995), as Misfits.
- Big Money Hustlas (2000), as Misfits 1–4 (individually credited).
- Bruiser (2000), as Misfits.
- Campfire Stories (2001), as Misfits.

== See also ==
- List of cover versions of Misfits songs
- Horror punk
