= American Psycho (album) =

Studio album by Misfits
- Released: May 13, 1997
- Recorded: January 1997
- Genres: Horror punk; hardcore punk; heavy metal
- Length: 39:26
- Label: Geffen
- Producers: Daniel Rey, Misfits

Misfits chronology
Static Age (1996)	American Psycho (1997)	Evillive II (1998)

Singles from American Psycho
- 1. "Dig Up Her Bones" Released: July 1997

American Psycho is the fourth studio album by the American punk rock band Misfits. Released on May 13, 1997, it was the first to be recorded and released without the band's founder and former leader Glenn Danzig. Bassist Jerry Only, after years of litigation, reached a settlement with Danzig and was granted the rights to use the band's name and image to record and perform. The album also marked the addition of singer Michale Graves and Dr. Chud on drums.

Originally, the album was going to be titled Dead Kings Rise, a play on the band's resurrection, but was changed when the title track did not make the album. The album was produced by New York City based musician Daniel Rey, who had previously worked with artists such as the Ramones and King Missile.

== Reception ==
Professional ratings
Review scores
Source	Rating
AllMusic	2.5/5 stars
Collector's Guide to Heavy Metal	7/10
Entertainment Weekly	B
PopMatters	Positive
Rolling Stone	1.5/5 stars

Entertainment Weekly wrote that "their goofy formula of lyrics inspired by bad horror movies, poppy vocals, and blasting hardcore is still excellent mosh-pit fodder."

== Track listing ==
All tracks are written by the Misfits (Michale Graves, Jerry Only, Doyle Wolfgang von Frankenstein, and Dr. Chud) except where noted.

No.	Title	Length
1.	"Abominable Dr. Phibes" (instrumental; based on The Abominable Dr. Phibes)	1:41
2.	"American Psycho" (based on American Psycho)	2:06
3.	"Speak of the Devil"	1:47
4.	"Walk Among Us" (based on The Creature Walks Among Us)	1:23
5.	"The Hunger"	1:43
6.	"From Hell They Came"	2:16
7.	"Dig Up Her Bones"	3:01
8.	"Blacklight"	1:27
9.	"Resurrection"	1:29
10.	"This Island Earth" (based on This Island Earth)	2:15
11.	"Crimson Ghost" (based on The Crimson Ghost)	2:01
12.	"Day of the Dead" (based on Day of the Dead)	1:49
13.	"The Haunting" (based on The Haunting)	1:25
14.	"Mars Attacks" (based on Mars Attacks)	2:28
15.	"Hate the Living, Love the Dead" (based on Bride of Frankenstein)	1:36
16.	"Shining" (based on Poltergeist)	2:59
17.	"Don't Open 'Til Doomsday" (based on Don't Open Till Doomsday): "Hell Night (based on Hell Night)" (hidden track; written by the Misfits and Daniel Rey)	7:58
Total length:		39:26

LP bonus track
No.	Title	Length
18.	"Dead Kings Rise"	3:06
Total length:		42:32

== Personnel ==
- Michale Graves – vocals
- Doyle Wolfgang von Frankenstein – guitar
- Jerry Only – bass
- Dr. Chud – drums, keyboards on tracks "Abominable Dr. Phibes", "Speak Of The Devil", "Walk Among Us", "Blacklight", and "This Island Earth"
- Daniel Rey – keyboards on track "Dig Up Her Bones"
- Andy Wallace – mixing

== Chart positions ==
Chart	Peak position
Billboard 200	117
