= John Cafiero =

American punk rock musician and filmmaker

John Cafiero is an American punk rock musician and filmmaker. He is best known as the frontman for the punk supergroup Osaka Popstar, whose debut album was released summer 2006. The full album lineup toured the UK in September 2006, followed by a tour of the United States and Canada with the legendary punk band The Misfits in Fiend Fest '06.

== Biography ==
Cafiero directed and co-produced (with wife Suzanne Cafiero) the music videos of the Misfits' songs "American Psycho" and "Dig Up Her Bones", which appeared on MTV's 120 Minutes and public-access television cable TV in the United States, and on MTV Japan and the Space Shower TV channel in Japan in late 1997. They were screened at the Euro-Underground Film Festival and Rhode Island International Film Festival in late 1998, garnering a "Best of Fest" award for the former and a Horror Writers Association nomination.

For his direct-to-video directorial debut, Cafiero directed and co-produced (again with wife) Big Money Hustlas for the Insane Clown Posse and appeared in front of the camera as "The Director" alongside the Misfits as themselves. The film was released in 2000 and topped the Billboard video sales charts for several weeks. Over the course of nine months in 2003–2004, he directed a documentary about the punk band Ramones, entitled Ramones: Raw.

In 1998, Cafiero wrote and sang (as guest vocalist) the song "I Wanna Be a NY Ranger" with the Misfits. In a Hit Parader article on the song, he names the Ramones as his childhood heroes and the New York Rangers as a defining New York City team.
