= List of cover versions of Misfits songs =

The Misfits are an American punk rock band often recognized as the progenitors of the horror punk subgenre, blending punk rock and other musical influences with horror film themes and imagery. Since the band's formation in 1977 numerous cover versions of their songs have been recorded and released by artists who cite the Misfits as an influence.

After the band's initial breakup in 1983 singer Glenn Danzig formed Samhain, re-recording several songs he had written and performed with the Misfits. These included "Horror Business", re-recorded as "Horror Biz" for Initium (1984), "All Hell Breaks Loose", re-recorded as "All Hell" for Unholy Passion (1985), and "Halloween II" which was re-recorded for November-Coming-Fire (1986). Live recordings of all three songs, as well as of "Death Comes Ripping" and "London Dungeon", were released on Live '85–'86 in 2001.

Five compilation tribute albums to the Misfits have been released over the years, made up of various artists covering Misfits songs. Louisville Babylon (1994) featured bands from Louisville, Kentucky and was released by the Analog Distillery label. In 2007 a sequel was released, Louisville Babylon 2. In 1997 Caroline Records released Violent World, featuring primarily punk rock bands. Hell on Earth was released in 2000 by Cleopatra Records and featured industrial rock, death metal, and garage punk acts. In 2008 Acoustic Fury released Acoustic A.D.: An Acoustic Tribute to The Misfits.

In 2005 The Nutley Brass released Fiend Club Lounge, an album of Misfits songs performed in an instrumental lounge and space age pop style. Another band to record albums of instrumental Misfits covers are The Crimson Ghosts, who released surf rock-style covers on Some Kinda Hits (2005) and Earth E.P. (2008).

In 2007 former Misfits guitarist Bobby Steele recorded covers of all of the songs from the unreleased Misfits album 12 Hits from Hell with his band The Undead and posted them as streaming audio through the band's website on Halloween.

Nearly all of the Misfits covers that have been officially released have been versions of songs written by Glenn Danzig and recorded during his tenure with the band from 1977 to 1983. Balzac are one of two bands to have released cover versions of songs from the later eras of the band's career, as they signed to Misfits bassist/singer Jerry Only's Misfits Records label in 2002. They covered "The Haunting" and "Don't Open 'Til Doomsday", both songs by the 1990s incarnation of the Misfits which included singer Michale Graves. These were released on a split single with the Misfits (who by then consisted of Jerry Only, Dez Cadena, and Marky Ramone) on which the Misfits covered Balzac's "The Day the Earth Caught Fire". The single was released under the title "Day the Earth Caught Fire" in North America and as "Don't Open 'Til Doomsday" in Japan. The Computers covered seven Misfits songs for a Halloween/Black Friday release, including a cover of Scream, a post-Danzig era Misfits song.

== Cover versions ==
Artist	Song	Release(s)
The 69 Eyes	"Return of the Fly"	Hell on Earth: A Tribute to the Misfits
Mad Sin	"London Dungeon"	Teachin` the Goodies - Lesson One
84 Lumber	"Mommy, Can I Go Out and Kill Tonight?"	Louisville Babylon
88 Fingers Louie	"Night of the Living Dead"	Behind Bars; Hopelessly Devoted to You
108	"Death Comes Ripping"	Violent World: A Tribute to the Misfits
AFI	"Last Caress"	Shut Your Mouth and Open Your Eyes
AFI	"Demonomania"	A Fire Inside EP
AFI	"Halloween"	All Hallow's E.P.
Aiden	"Die, Die My Darling"	Kerrang! High Voltage; Rain in Hell
Aiden	"London Dungeon"	Some Kind of Hate
Alkaline Trio	"Halloween"	"Halloween"
Alkaline Trio	"Children in Heat"	"Halloween"
The Amazing Crowns	"American Nightmare"	Payback Live
The Analogs	"Attitude"	Talent Zero
The Ataris	"Astro Zombies"	Live at the Metro
Austrian Death Machine	"I Turned into a Martian"	Double Brutal
Backyard Babies	"Teenagers from Mars"	Hell on Earth: A Tribute to the Misfits
Balzac	"Devil's Whorehouse"	Hell on Earth: A Tribute to the Misfits
Balzac	"The Haunting" / "Don't Open 'Til Doomsday"	"Day the Earth Caught Fire"
Behemoth	"Devilock"	Ezkaton
Bigger Better Bombs	"Horror Hotel"	If this one doesn't scare you... You're Already Dead!
Black Kerouac	"Night of the Living Dead"	Louisville Babylon 2
Blitzkid	"Theme For a Jackyl"	Head Over Hills - EP
The Bouncing Souls	"Mommy, Can I Go Out and Kill Tonight?"	Violent World: A Tribute to the Misfits; The Bad, the Worse, and the Out of Print
The Bouncing Souls	"Hybrid Moments"	Complete Control Recording Sessions (The Bouncing Souls EP)
Bratmobile	"Where Eagles Dare"	The Real Janelle
Buck-O-Nine	"Teenagers from Mars"	Barfly
The Casting Out	"Skulls"	Dropcard EP
Chemic	"Return of the Fly"	Louisville Babylon 2
Cherub Scourge	"Nike-A-Go-Go"	Louisville Babylon
Coliseum	"Bullet"	Superchunk / Coliseum split single
Fiskales Ad-Hok	"Angelfuck"	12
Content Zero	"Last Caress"	Louisville Babylon
The Cooters	"Static Age"	Chaos or Bust
The Cooters	"TV Casualty"	Chaos or Bust
Cradle of Filth	"Death Comes Ripping"	From the Cradle to Enslave
Cradle of Filth	"Halloween II" (as "HW2")	Underworld: Evolution: Original Motion Picture Soundtrack; Thornography
Crain	"Teenagers from Mars"	Louisville Babylon
The Crimson Ghosts	"Attitude"	Some Kinda Hits
The Crimson Ghosts	"Hybrid Moments"	Some Kinda Hits
The Crimson Ghosts	"Astro Zombies" (also as "Fastro Zombies")	Some Kinda Hits
The Crimson Ghosts	"I Turned into a Martian"	Some Kinda Hits
The Crimson Ghosts	"American Nightmare"	Some Kinda Hits
The Crimson Ghosts	"Halloween"	Some Kinda Hits
The Crimson Ghosts	"Some Kinda Hate"	Some Kinda Hits
The Crimson Ghosts	"Hollywood Babylon"	Some Kinda Hits
The Crimson Ghosts	"Ghouls Night Out"	Some Kinda Hits
The Crimson Ghosts	"Skulls"	Some Kinda Hits
The Crimson Ghosts	"Where Eagles Dare"	Some Kinda Hits
The Crimson Ghosts	"Angelfuck"	Some Kinda Hits
The Crimson Ghosts	"She"	Some Kinda Hits
The Crimson Ghosts	"Last Caress"	Some Kinda Hits
The Crimson Ghosts	"London Dungeon"	Earth E.P.
The Crimson Ghosts	"Return of the Fly"	Earth E.P.
The Crimson Ghosts	"Horror Hotel"	Earth E.P.
The Crimson Ghosts	"Teenagers from Mars"	Earth E.P.
The Crimson Ghosts	"Children in Heat"	Earth E.P.
The Crimson Ghosts	"20 Eyes"	Earth E.P.
The Crimson Ghosts	"Night of the Living Dead"	Earth E.P.
The Crimson Ghosts	"Vampira"	Earth E.P.
The Crimson Ghosts	"Die, Die My Darling"	Earth E.P.
Crunchy Cereal	"London Dungeon"	Louisville Babylon
Da Yodelin' Taxidermist	"Skulls"	Louisville Babylon
Deadguy	"Horror Business"	Violent World: A Tribute to the Misfits
Deadline	"Teenagers from Mars"	Louisville Babylon
Tamara Dearing	"Hybrid Moments"	Louisville Babylon 2
Demons	"She"	Hell on Earth: A Tribute to the Misfits
Deranged	"Green Hell"	Hell on Earth: A Tribute to the Misfits
Drag the River	"Hybrid Moments"	Live at the Starlight
Dropkick Murphys	"Halloween"	Back on the Streets: Japanese/American Punk Unity; Singles Collection, Volume 2
Earth Crisis	"Earth A.D."	Violent World: A Tribute to the Misfits
Electric Hellfire Club	"Devil's Whorehouse"	Hell on Earth: A Tribute to the Misfits
Endpoint	"Attitude"	Louisville Babylon
Ensign	"Hatebreeders"	Love the Music, Hate the Kids
Extreme Unicorns	"Hybrid Moments"	
Entombed	"Hollywood Babylon"	Hell on Earth: A Tribute to the Misfits
Falling Forward	"She"	Louisville Babylon
Farside	"Return of the Fly"	Violent World: A Tribute to the Misfits
Gaj Mustafa Cell	"We Bite"	Louisville Babylon 2
The Gallery Singers	"Cough/Cool"	Louisville Babylon 2
Gallows	"We Bite"	Gallows
Gehennah	"Ghouls Night Out"	Hell on Earth: A Tribute to the Misfits
The Genitorturers	"All Hell Breaks Loose"	Flesh is the Law EP
Genocide SS	"Demonomania"	Hell on Earth: A Tribute to the Misfits
Goldfinger	"Ghouls Night Out"	Violent World: A Tribute to the Misfits
Gorilla Monsoon	"Braineaters"	Acoustic A.D.: An Acoustic Tribute to the Misfits
Graveblind	"Devilock"	Louisville Babylon
Green Day	"Hybrid Moments"	streaming media
Guns N' Roses	"Attitude"	The Spaghetti Incident?
Gyotaku	"Horror Hotel"	Louisville Babylon
Hatebreed	"Hatebreeders"	For the Lions
Hedge	"Halloween"	Louisville Babylon
Heideroosjes	"We Are 138"	20 Years: Ode & Tribute
The Hellacopters	"Bullet"	Hell on Earth: A Tribute to the Misfits
Helvetia	"Hybrid Moments"	Gladness (2001-2006)
Hula Hoop	"20 Eyes"	Louisville Babylon
Inhuman Dissiliency	"I Turned into a Martian"	Supreme Engorgement of Exquisite Disembowelment
Jawbreaker	"Skulls" (as part of a medley in "With or Without U2")	Make the Collector Nerd Sweat; Etc.
Leafpile	"20 Eyes"	Louisville Babylon
The Lemonheads	"Skulls"	Favourite Spanish Dishes
LG&E	"Some Kinda Hate"	Louisville Babylon
Link 80	"Who Killed Marilyn?"	17 Reasons
Lower Class Brats	"Bullet"	Loud and Out of Tune
Ronnie Mack	"Horror Hotel"	Louisville Babylon 2
Metallica	"Last Caress / Green Hell"	The $5.98 E.P. - Garage Days Re-Revisited; Garage Inc.
Metallica	"Die, Die My Darling"	Garage Inc.
Molotov	"I Turned into a Martian" (as "Marciano")	Con Todo Respeto
Munsen	"Braineaters" / "Teenagers from Mars" (as "Braineaters from Mars")	Louisville Babylon
The Murder City Devils	"Hybrid Moments"	In Name and Blood (Vinyl only bonus track)
My Chemical Romance	"Astro Zombies"	Tony Hawk's American Wasteland
My Morning Jacket	"Hollywood Babylon"	Louisville Babylon 2
The Network	"Teenagers from Mars"	Money Money 2020
NOFX	"Last Caress"	Violent World: A Tribute to the Misfits; 45 or 46 Songs That Weren't Good Enough to Go on Our Other Records
No Use for a Name	"I Turned into a Martian"	Live in a Dive
No Use for a Name	"Hybrid Moments"	The Return of the Read Menace
The Nutley Brass	"Last Caress"	Fiend Club Lounge
The Nutley Brass	"Astro Zombies"	Fiend Club Lounge
The Nutley Brass	"Where Eagles Dare"	Fiend Club Lounge
The Nutley Brass	"Some Kinda Hate"	Fiend Club Lounge
The Nutley Brass	"Hybrid Moments"	Fiend Club Lounge
The Nutley Brass	"Hatebreeders"	Fiend Club Lounge
The Nutley Brass	"Teenagers from Mars"	Fiend Club Lounge
The Nutley Brass	"Attitude"	Fiend Club Lounge
The Nutley Brass	"Angelfuck"	Fiend Club Lounge
The Nutley Brass	"Skulls"	Fiend Club Lounge
The Nutley Brass	"Die, Die My Darling"	Fiend Club Lounge
One Small Step	"20 Eyes"	Louisville Babylon 2
Dave Pajo	"Angelfuck"	Louisville Babylon 2
Pennywise	"Astro Zombies"	Violent World: A Tribute to the Misfits
Phantasmic	"I Turned into a Martian"	I Light Up Your Life
Plunge	"Death Comes Ripping"	Louisville Babylon
Pont'ys Camper	"Astro Zombies"	Louisville Babylon 2
Brook Pridemore	"Last Caress"	Acoustic A.D.: An Acoustic Tribute to the Misfits
Prong	"London Dungeon"	Violent World: A Tribute to the Misfits
Revolution Reign	"Dig Up Her Bones"	Streaming Media
Rise Against	"Hybrid Moments"	Nowhere Sessions - EP
The Robots	"Night of the Living Dead"	Hell on Earth: A Tribute to the Misfits
Rodan	"Who Killed Marilyn?"	Louisville Babylon
Samhain	"Horror Business" (as "Horror Biz")	Initium; Live 85-86
Samhain	"All Hell Breaks Loose" (as "All Hell")	Unholy Passion; Final Descent; Live 85-86
Samhain	"Halloween II"	November-Coming-Fire; Live 85-86
Samhain	"Death Comes Ripping"	Live 85-86
Samhain	"London Dungeon"	Live 85-86
Shades Apart	"20 Eyes"	Violent World: A Tribute to the Misfits
Sick of It All	"All Hell Breaks Loose"	Violent World: A Tribute to the Misfits
Slate	"Die, Die My Darling"	Louisville Babylon
The Slackers	"Attitude"	The Radio
Slo-pok	"Night of the Living Dead"	Louisville Babylon
Sloppy Seconds	"Where Eagles Dare"	Where Eagles Dare b/w Tragedy Twenty Three
The Slow Break	"Attitude"	Louisville Babylon 2
Snapcase	"She"	Violent World: A Tribute to the Misfits
Sum 41	"Attitude"	streaming media
A Sunny Day in Glasgow	"Hybrid Moments"	streaming media, download
Sunspring	"Where Eagles Dare"	Louisville Babylon
Superchunk	"Horror Business"	download; Superchunk / Coliseum split single
Superchunk	"Where Eagles Dare"	download
Switchyard	"Hybrid Moments"	The Secret Life of Spiders
Tanner	"TV Casualty"	Violent World: A Tribute to the Misfits
Tenebre	"Halloween II"	Hell on Earth: A Tribute to the Misfits
Therapy?	"Where Eagles Dare"	Violent World: A Tribute to the Misfits
Throwdown	"London Dungeon"	Trustkill Takeover Volume II
Tiger Army	"American Nightmare"	Early Years EP
Trivium	"Skulls...We Are 138"	Vengeance Falls (Special Edition)"
Troublemakers	"Where Eagles Dare"	Hell on Earth: A Tribute to the Misfits
Ultra Pulverize	"Where Eagles Dare"	Louisville Babylon 2
The Undead	"Halloween"	streaming media
The Undead	"Vampira"	streaming media
The Undead	"I Turned into a Martian"	streaming media
The Undead	"Skulls"	streaming media
The Undead	"London Dungeon"	streaming media
The Undead	"Night of the Living Dead"	streaming media
The Undead	"Horror Hotel"	streaming media
The Undead	"Ghouls Night Out"	streaming media
The Undead	"Astro Zombies"	streaming media
The Undead	"Where Eagles Dare"	streaming media
The Undead	"Violent World"	streaming media
The Undead	"Halloween II"	streaming media
The Zen Circus	"Where Eagles Dare"	
The Valkyrians	"Astro Zombies"	Punkrocksteady
Venetian Snares	"She"	Winter in the Belly of a Snake
Volbeat	"Angelfuck"	Live From Beyond Hell/Above Heaven
Wax Fang	"Halloween"	Louisville Babylon 2
WELT	"Hybrid Moments"	Brand New Dream
Winds of Plague	"Halloween"	The Great Stone War
Wolfpack	"Death Comes Ripping"	Hell on Earth: A Tribute to the Misfits
Yvonne	"She"	Getting Out, Getting Anywhere
Emily Donohue	“Saturday Night”	‘Vices’
