= 12 Hits from Hell =

Studio album by the Misfits
- Released: October 30, 2001 (cancelled)
- Recorded: August 7, 1980
- Studios: Master Sound Productions, Franklin Square, New York
- Genres: Horror punk; punk rock
- Length: 25:02
- Label: Caroline
- Producers: Rob Alter; Tom Bejgrowicz

Misfits chronology
Cuts from the Crypt (2001)	12 Hits from Hell (2001)	Project 1950 (2003)

12 Hits from Hell: The MSP Sessions is a cancelled studio album by American horror punk band the Misfits. It was recorded in 1980 but went unreleased. Caroline Records attempted to release it in 2001, but band members Glenn Danzig and Jerry Only called off production and the album was scrapped.

== Background ==
On August 7, 1980, the Misfits recorded twelve songs at Master Sound Productions studios with the intention of releasing a full-length album. The band's lineup at this time included singer Glenn Danzig, guitarist Bobby Steele, bassist Jerry Only, and drummer Arthur Googy. During the sessions, Only was attempting to get his younger brother Doyle to join the band, and Doyle recorded his own guitar tracks and overdubs separately in addition to Steele's. The tracks were mixed in September, but in October, Steele was ejected from the band in favor of Doyle and the planned album was scrapped. Four of the songs were released in 1981, with "London Dungeon", "Horror Hotel" and "Ghouls Night Out" being released as 3 Hits from Hell while the "Halloween" single included both "Halloween II". The band used the remainder of the recordings as demos for their 1982 album Walk Among Us.

The Misfits broke up in 1983, but after a series of legal battles in the late 1980s and early 1990s, Only and Doyle regained the rights to record and perform as the Misfits, sharing merchandising rights with Danzig, who holds writing credits on all of the Misfits material written between 1977 and 1983. Only and Doyle formed a new incarnation of the band and released two albums during the 1990s. During the intervening years, several of the tracks from the August 1980 sessions were released in various mixes on compilation albums: "Halloween" appeared on Legacy of Brutality (1985), "Night of the Living Dead", "Vampira", "Skulls" and "Astro Zombies" appeared on Misfits (1986), and "Horror Hotel" appeared on Collection II (1995). The Misfits box set (1996) contained the most complete collection of songs from these sessions, collecting the complete Legacy of Brutality, Misfits, and Collection II albums as well as a disc of unreleased studio recordings with the original mixes of "I Turned into a Martian", "Skulls", "Night of the Living Dead", "Astro Zombies", "Where Eagles Dare", "Violent World" and "Halloween II" from the 1980 sessions.

In 2001, Caroline Records announced that they would be releasing the complete 1980 sessions on October 30 under the title 12 Hits from Hell, including an alternate take of "London Dungeon", and sent promotional copies of the album to the band members. However, production was called off after Glenn Danzig and Jerry Only expressed concerns with the album's layout, packaging, liner notes, mixing and mastering. All distribution copies of the album were destroyed and only the promotional copies remain. As a result, some copies still managed to reach critics.

On Halloween 2007, Bobby Steele posted his own versions of the 12 Hits from Hell songs, recorded with his band the Undead, as streaming audio through the band's website.

== Reception ==
Jason Birchmeier of AllMusic gave 12 Hits from Hell three stars out of five, saying "This isn't an essential item and will probably appeal mostly to the legions of Misfits fanatics, who will no doubt savor these long-unreleased recordings. Many of these songs are available elsewhere."

== Track listing ==
All tracks are written by Glenn Danzig.

No.	Title	Length
1.	"Halloween"	1:46
2.	"Vampira"	1:22
3.	"I Turned Into a Martian"	1:52
4.	"Skulls"	1:56
5.	"London Dungeon"	2:33
6.	"Night of the Living Dead"	1:53
7.	"Horror Hotel"	1:26
8.	"Ghouls Night Out"	1:56
9.	"Astro Zombies"	2:13
10.	"Where Eagles Dare"	1:40
11.	"Violent World"	1:35
12.	"Halloween II"	2:30

Bonus track
No.	Title	Length
13.	"London Dungeon" (Alternate Take)	2:40

== Personnel ==
- Glenn Danzig – vocals
- Jerry Only – bass guitar
- Bobby Steele – guitar
- Doyle Wolfgang von Frankenstein – additional guitar and overdubs
- Arthur Googy – drums
- Robbie Alter – additional guitar on "London Dungeon" and "Violent World"
