= Mommy, Can I Go Out & Kill Tonight =

Song by the Misfits

from the album Walk Among Us
- Released: March 1982
- Recorded: December 17, 1981; The Ritz, New York City
- Genre: Punk rock; speed metal
- Length: 1:58
- Label: Ruby, Slash
- Songwriter: Glenn Danzig

"Mommy, Can I Go Out & Kill Tonight" (Note: The formatting of the song's title has varied across different releases. On the album Walk Among Us, the label of the single "Die, Die My Darling", and the CD and cassette releases of the album Earth A.D./Wolfs Blood, the song is listed as "Mommy, Can I Go Out & Kill Tonight". On the compilation album Misfits (Collection I), the song is listed as "Mommy Can I Go Out and Kill Tonight?". In the boxed set The Misfits, the song is listed as "Mommy, Can I Go Out and Kill Tonight". The song's title also varies across digital download and streaming services.) is a song by the American punk rock band Misfits. Written by vocalist Glenn Danzig, the song was first released as a live recording on their 1982 album Walk Among Us. A studio recording of the song was later released alongside the track "We Bite" as the B-side of the 1984 single "Die, Die My Darling". "Mommy, Can I Go Out & Kill Tonight" was later included on the 1986 compilation album Misfits (also known as Collection I), the cassette and CD releases of the album Earth A.D./Wolfs Blood, and the 1996 boxed set The Misfits.

== Background and release ==
"Mommy, Can I Go Out & Kill Tonight" was first released on the Misfits' debut album Walk Among Us, released in March 1982 by Ruby Records, an imprint of Slash Records. This version of the song was recorded live on December 17, 1981 at the Ritz in New York City, and is the only live track on the album. In July 1983, the song was re-recorded at Fox Studio in Rutherford, New Jersey, and this version was included alongside the track "We Bite" as the B-side of the single "Die, Die My Darling", which was released in May 1984 through Danzig's own label, Plan 9 Records. Although they were not included on the original LP version of Earth A.D./Wolfs Blood, all three songs from the "Die, Die My Darling" single (including the studio version of "Mommy, Can I Go Out & Kill Tonight") were included on the album when it was first released on cassette in 1988 and on CD in 1992.

The song was also included on the 1986 compilation album Misfits (also known as Collection I), which would later be included in the 1996 boxed set The Misfits.

== Critical reception ==
Aaron Lariviere of Stereogum ranked "Mommy, Can I Go Out & Kill Tonight" No. 10 on his list of the 10 best Misfits songs, writing that the song's opening "leads into one of the best Misfits moments ever when the song lurches to a sudden stop. Everything hangs for a second before Danzig screams the title [...] and we bash our way through the song in double-time." Chris Krovatin of Kerrang! included the song on his list of the 13 "best songs about mothers", calling it a "breakneck Misfits classic".

In his book This Music Leaves Stains: The Complete Story of the Misfits, author James Greene, Jr. writes of the song and its inclusion on Walk Among Us: "the Misfits chose to break up their debut's slick presentation midway through with a very rough live recording of the proto-speed metal half-joke 'Mommy, Can I Go Out & Kill Tonight?' [...] The slightly off-time performance is an interesting palate cleanser but manages to keep thematically with the rest of the album's frustrated outcast mantras."

== Personnel ==
=== Walk Among Us version ===
The Misfits

- Glenn Danzig – vocals
- Jerry Only – bass
- Doyle – guitar
- Arthur Googy – drums

Production

- Mike Taylor – producer
- The Misfits – producers
- Pat Burnette – producer

=== Single version ===
The Misfits

- Glenn Danzig – vocals
- Jerry Only – bass
- Doyle – guitar
- Robo – drums

Production

- Spot – producer
- The Misfits – producers

== Cover versions ==
The Bouncing Souls recorded a cover version of the song for the 1997 tribute album Violent World: A Tribute to the Misfits. The song has also been covered by Plasmid.

== See also ==
- Misfits discography
