= Love Me, Love Me Not =

Love Me, Love Me Not or Loves Me, Loves Me Not may refer to:

== Television ==
- Love Me, Love Me Not (game show), a 1986–1987 Canadian game show
- Love Me, Love Me Not (British game show), 1988, based on the Canadian game show
- Loves Me, Loves Me Not (TV series), a 1977 American situation comedy
- Love Me, Love Me Not (Singaporean TV series), 2001
- "He Loves Me, He Loves Me Not", a Shining Time Station episode, 1991

== Film ==
- Love Me, Love Me Not (film), a 1996 Canadian drama film
- He Loves Me... He Loves Me Not (film), a 2002 French film

== Other ==
- Love Me, Love Me Not (manga), a 2015 Japanese manga series by Io Sakisaka
- She Loves Me, She Loves Me Not, album by Kiss it Goodbye
- He loves me... he loves me not, a game
- He Loves Me, He Loves Me Not (album), a 1956 album by Chris Connor

== See also ==
- Love Me Not (disambiguation)
- She Loves Me Not (disambiguation)
- "He Loves Me, He Loves Me Not, He Loves Me, Oops He's Dead!", an episode of Psych
