= She Loves Me Not =

She Loves Me Not may refer to:

- She Loves Me Not (1918 film), a 1918 film
- She Loves Me Not (1934 film), a 1934 film starring Miriam Hopkins and Bing Crosby
- She Loves Me Not, a 2013 film by Brian Jun
- She Loves Me Not, a 1987 album by Alan Rankine
- "She Loves Me Not" (Faith No More song), a 1997 song by Faith No More
- "She Loves Me Not" (song), a 2002 single by Papa Roach

== See also ==
- Love Me, Love Me Not (disambiguation)
- He loves me... he loves me not
- She Loves Me, She Loves Me Not, album by Kiss It Goodbye
- "Loves Me Not", tATu single
- Love Me Not, Korean film
