= Love Me Not (disambiguation) =

Love Me Not is a 2006 film.

Love Me Not may also refer to:

- "Love Me Not" (Skepta song), 2019
- "Love Me Not" (Ravyn Lenae song), 2024

== See also ==
- "Loves Me Not", a song by tATu
- She Loves Me Not (disambiguation)
- Love Me, Love Me Not (disambiguation)
