= Fiend Club Lounge =

Studio album by the Nutley Brass
- Released: June 28, 2005
- Genres: Lounge music, space age pop
- Label: Misfits
- Producer: John Cafiero

Misfits tributes chronology
Hell on Earth: A Tribute to the Misfits (2000)	Fiend Club Lounge (2005)

Professional ratings
Review scores
Source	Rating
AllMusic	3/5 stars

Misfits Meet the Nutley Brass: Fiend Club Lounge is a tribute album to the American horror punk band Misfits, recorded by the Nutley Brass (who had previously recorded a tribute record to the Ramones) and released in 2005 by Misfits Records. It features cover versions of Misfits songs from the band's early era, 1977 to 1983, performed in an instrumental "lounge" or "space age pop" style.

Misfits bassist Jerry Only commented that "The Nutley Brass version of 'Die, Die My Darling' is swirling with 007 suspense like the soundtrack of an early James Bond movie. The horns seem to jet out like one of the old albums from the Tijuana Brass." Original Misfits guitarist Franché Coma remarked that "Fiend Club Lounge is one of the best renditions of some of the best Misfits songs ever recorded. Any true, and I mean true musician will appreciate the intricacies of the instrumentations on this CD. It takes punk music to a different level. It shows us how anything is possible if you want to make it happen. You'll think you are listening to a soundtrack from a big screen movie. A great lush theatrical feel."

== Track listing ==
All tracks are written by Glenn Danzig and originally performed by the Misfits.

No.	Title	Length
1.	"Last Caress"	1:59
2.	"Astro Zombies"	2:08
3.	"Where Eagles Dare"	2:24
4.	"Some Kinda Hate"	2:08
5.	"Hybrid Moments"	2:25
6.	"Hatebreeders"	2:06
7.	"Teenagers from Mars"	1:45
8.	"Attitude"	2:21
9.	"Angelfuck"	1:53
10.	"Skulls"	2:10
11.	"Die, Die My Darling"	2:02

== Personnel ==
- Produced, conducted, and engineered by Sam Elwitt
- Executive Producers: John Cafiero and Jerry Only
- Additional recording and engineering by Mitch Rackin
- Vocalizations on "Teenagers from Mars" and "Some Kinda Hate" by Clare McKeen
- Mastered by Alan Douches at West West Side Music
- Artwork by Basil Gogos
- Interior packaging layout and additional graphic design by Edward Odowd
- Additional graphics by Paul Grosso
- Front and back cover concept and art direction by John Cafiero
