= Protestant (album) =

Studio album by Rorschach
- Released: 1993
- Recorded: August–November, 1992
- Studio: Platinum Sound (Boston, Massachusetts)
- Genre: Hardcore punk; metalcore; powerviolence
- Length: 37:41
- Label: Wardance, Gern Blandsten
- Producer: David Locke, Peter Nusbaum

Rorschach chronology
Remain Sedate (1991)	Protestant (1993)	Autopsy (1995)

Protestant is the second and final studio album by American hardcore punk band Rorschach. It was released in 1993 through Wardance Records and Gern Blandsten. The majority of the songs were written during the band's Europe tour.

The band's complex combination of metal and hardcore influenced many artists in the metalcore genre, including Converge guitarist Kurt Ballou.

The tracks on the album were featured on the 1995 compilation album, Autopsy. The track "Traditional" was covered by Krallice.

== Critical reception ==
The album was inducted to Decibel's Hall of Fame. Decibel wrote: "Protestant's incendiary nature and bleach-into-open-wound sound—a metaphor for cramming Voivod angularity and the Jesus Lizard skronk into Judge hardcore and Melvins’ noise-doom—belies the fact that the album was created and recorded under less-than-ideal conditions."

== Track listing ==
No.	Title	Length
1.	"Mandible"	2:40
2.	"In Ruins"	2:28
3.	"Traditional"	3:15
4.	"Drawn and Quartered"	3:21
5.	"Shanks"	3:23
6.	"Recurring Nightmare #105"	3:44
7.	"Blinders"	3:30
8.	"Hemlock"	2:23
9.	"Raw Nerve"	1:25
10.	"Skin Culture"	4:41
11.	"Cut the Wheel"	2:37
12.	"Ornaments"	4:14

== Personnel ==
Rorschach

- Tom Rusnak — bass
- Andrew Gormley — drums
- Keith Huckins — guitars
- Nick Forté — guitars
- Charles Maggio — vocals

Other staff

- Justine DeMetrick — cover art
- Cynthia MacAdams — cover art
- David Locke — engineering
- Peter Nusbaum — engineering
- OM-IS — layout
- Rick Essig — mastering
