= Remain Sedate =

Studio album by Rorschach
- Released: 1990/1991
- Recorded: 1990
- Genre: Hardcore punk; heavy hardcore; metalcore
- Length: 23:45
- Label: Vermiform

Rorschach chronology
Remain Sedate (1990)	Protestant (1993)

Remain Sedate is the debut album by Rorschach. The first ever release to be labelled metalcore, it shows the band's sound at a stage when they played fast, heavy hardcore with a metal slant and raspy hardcore vocals. At this time they also drew heavy comparisons to Die Kreuzen for their bizarre chord progressions and Charles Maggio's unearthly howl.

The tracks on the album were featured on the 1995 compilation album, Autopsy. The first song of the album, "Pavlov's Dogs" is depicted in the 2012 film Zero Dark Thirty as being used to torture suspected terrorists. Kansas City metallic hardcore band Remain Sedate is named after the album.

== Track listing ==
No.	Title	Length
1.	"Pavlov's Dogs"	2:23
2.	"In the Year of Our Lord"	2:04
3.	"Someone"	2:20
4.	"Impressions"	1:18
5.	"Clenching"	2:05
6.	"So It Goes"	1:35
7.	"Lightning Strikes Twice"	1:45
8.	"No One Dies Alone"	3:09
9.	"My Mind's in a Vice (And It's Being Cranked Real Tight)"	0:36
10.	"Checkmate"	1:35
11.	"Exist"	1:44
12.	"Oppress"	3:45

== Personnel ==
Rorschach

- Andrew Gormley — drums
- Chris Laucella — bass
- Keith Huckins — guitars
- Nick Forté — guitars
- Charles Maggio — vocals
