= Choke (Kiss It Goodbye EP) =

EP by Kiss It Goodbye
- Released: November 2, 1999
- Recorded: 1998
- Studio: Red Room Studio (Seattle, Washington)
- Genres: Metalcore, mathcore
- Length: 9:36 (7"); 21:12 (CD)
- Label: Revelation Records
- Producers: Matt Bayles; Billy Anderson

Kiss It Goodbye chronology
| She Loves Me, She Loves Me Not (1997) | Choke (1999) |

Professional ratings
Review scores
| Source | Rating |
|---|---|
| AllMusic | 2/5 stars |
| Scene Point Blank | 9/10 stars |

Choke is the final release by metalcore band Kiss It Goodbye, released as a 7-inch single as well as a compact disc on November 2, 1999 through Revelation Records. The tracks "Choke", "Cement", and "Watching Hellraiser" were originally recorded in 1998 to be released as an EP through Sub Pop Records, however the band broke-up in September 1997 after vocalist Tim Singer left the group.

The newly recorded tracks would remain unreleased until Revelation released "Choke" and "Cement" as a 7" single. Those two tracks, along with "Watching Hellraiser" and two tracks taken from the "Preacher" 7" (which were recorded during the same sessions as She Loves Me, She Loves Me Not), would be released as a CDEP that same day.

== Track listing ==
All tracks are written by Kiss It Goodbye.

| No. | Title | Length |
|---|---|---|
| 1. | "Choke" | 4:35 |
| 2. | "Cement" | 4:59 |
| 3. | "Watching Hellraiser" | 4:14 |
| 4. | "Preacher" | 2:40 |
| 5. | "Target Practice" | 4:44 |
| Total length: | | 21:12 |

== Personnel ==
- Tim Singer - vocals, layout
- Tom Rusnak - bass
- Andre Gorms - drums
- Dermain Headboy - artwork, guitar ("Choke", "Cement", and "Watching Hellraiser")
- Keith Huckins - guitar ("Preacher" and "Target Practice")
- Matt Bayles - engineering ("Choke", "Cement", and "Watching Hellraiser")
- Billy Anderson - engineering ("Preacher" and "Target Practice")
- Jeff Caudill - layout
- Alan Douches - mastering
