= 3 Hits from Hell =

EP by Misfits
- Released: April 1981
- Recorded: August 1980
- Studio: Master Sound Productions, Franklin Square, New York
- Genre: Punk rock; horror punk
- Length: 5:54
- Label: Plan 9
- Producer: Rob Alter

Misfits chronology
Beware (1980)	3 Hits from Hell (1981)	Walk Among Us (1982)

Professional ratings
Review scores
Source	Rating
Punknews.org	4/5 stars

3 Hits from Hell (stylized as 3 hits from HeLL) is the sixth release by American horror punk band Misfits. The 7" EP was released in April 1981 via Plan 9 Records. While there was no actual insert, some of the first pressing included a Misfits Fiend Club ad.

All three songs were recorded on 2" 16-track tape at Master Sound Productions in Franklin Square, New York, on August 7, 1980, with Bobby Steele on guitar for the main riff of "London Dungeon" and producer Robbie Alter playing the chords, while Jerry Only's younger brother Doyle (Paul Caiafa) recorded guitar on the rest of the songs on September 5, 1980, following Bobby's departure. It was during this session that Doyle officially joined the band as Bobby's replacement.

While none of the other ten songs from this session were released until 1985, after the band had broken up, all 13 tracks were later remixed for the 12 Hits from Hell release.

"London Dungeon" was written by Glenn Danzig about his experience while jailed in Brixton on December 2, 1979. Both "Horror Hotel" and "Ghouls Night Out" were based on horror films: Horror Hotel (a 1960 Christopher Lee vehicle) and the 1958 Ed Wood film Night of the Ghouls, respectively.

== Pressing history ==
The pressing history and details of this three-song EP are the most confounding to record collectors of any Misfits' release. Since all of the known pressing records were incomplete or incorrect, it is impossible to know any more than a few facts mixed with much conjecture.

There were at least two, but possibly as many as five, distinct pressings. Estimates on the number and order of the various combinations of record attributes ranges from 3,000 to 7,000 black vinyl with a grey label and large spindle, which is known conclusively to be the earliest pressing, 2,000 to 7,000 black vinyl with a red label and large spindle, of which as many as 10 to 100 may actually be from an abbreviated earlier pressing, and 400 to 1,000 black vinyl with a red label and small spindle. The only fixed number is that there were 400 white vinyl copies with a red label and a large spindle, which was the final pressing. The total number of EPs pressed is estimated to be either 6,500 or 10,000, depending on which pressing information is to be believed.

== Track listing ==
All tracks are written by Glenn Danzig.

Side A
No.	Title	Length
1.	"London Dungeon"	2:33

Side B
No.	Title	Length
1.	"Horror Hotel"	1:25
2.	"Ghouls Night Out"	1:56
Total length:		5:54

== Personnel ==
The Misfits

- Glenn Danzig – vocals
- Jerry Only – background vocals, bass
- Doyle – guitar on "Horror Hotel" and "Ghouls Night Out"
- Arthur Googy – drums
- Bobby Steele – guitar on "London Dungeon"

Production

- Rob Alter – producer, additional guitar and sound effects on "London Dungeon"
