= London Dungeon (song) =

1981 Misfits song

Song by the Misfits

from the EP 3 Hits from Hell
- Released: April 1981
- Recorded: August 1980; Master Sound Productions, Franklin Square, New York
- Genre: Punk rock; horror punk
- Length: 2:33
- Label: Plan 9
- Songwriter: Glenn Danzig
- Producer: Rob Alter

"London Dungeon" is a song by the American punk rock band Misfits. Released in 1981 on the Misfits' EP 3 Hits from Hell, the song was written by frontman and vocalist Glenn Danzig while in jail in Brixton, England with then-Misfits guitarist Bobby Steele. After having traveled to the United Kingdom for an ill-fated tour with the British punk rock group the Damned in late 1979, Danzig and Steele were arrested for their involvement in a fight, inspiring them to create the song.

== Background ==
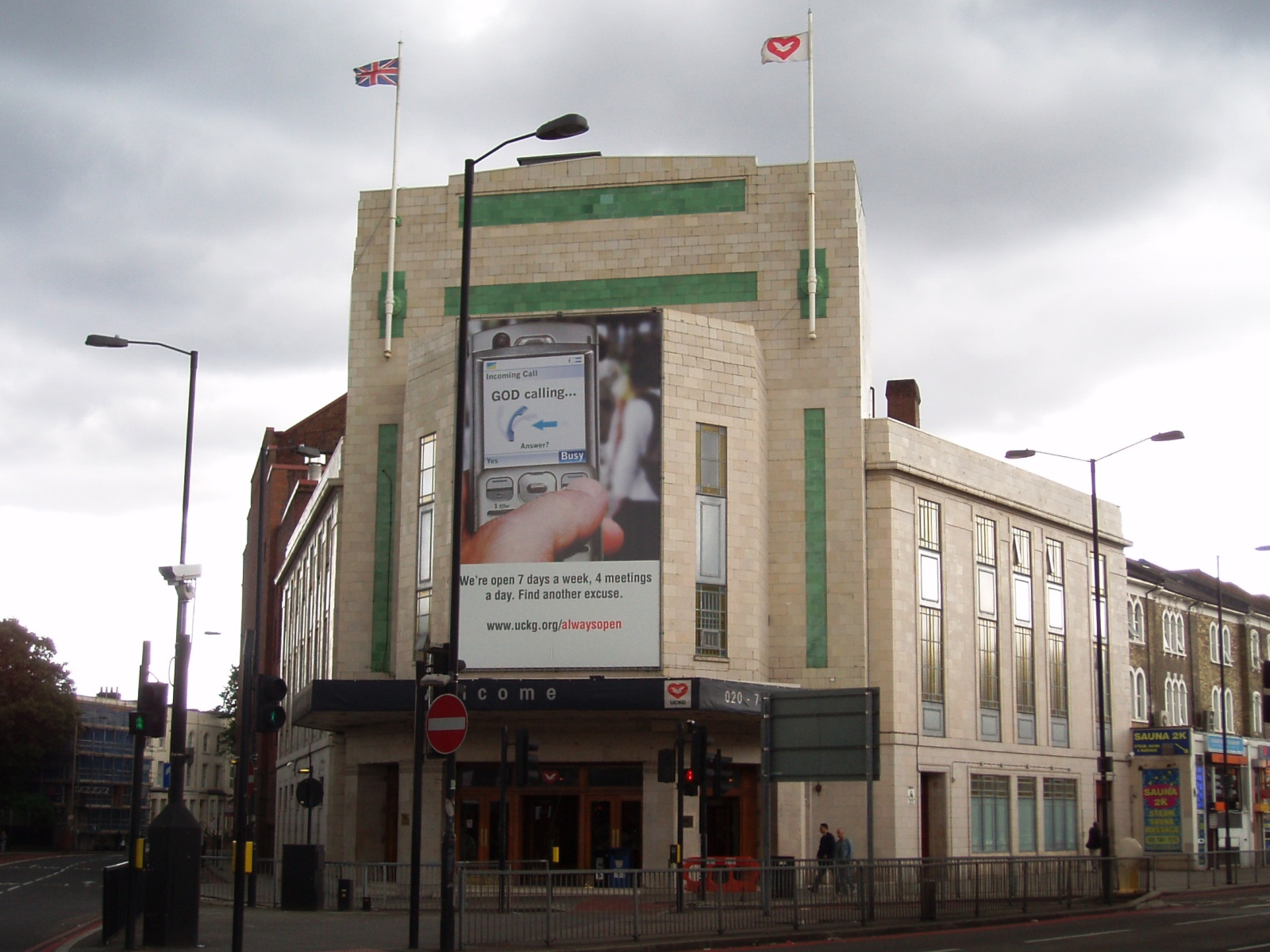
The Rainbow Theatre in London, where Glenn Danzig and Bobby Steele were arrested in December 1979

In June 1979, the Misfits shared a bill with the Damned during a performance at the nightclub Hurrah in New York City. After the gig, Misfits bassist Jerry Only briefly spoke with vocalist David Vanian of the Damned, along with the Damned's management, about the idea of the Misfits supporting the Damned during the latter's scheduled six-date tour of England that fall. On November 21, 1979, the Misfits flew to the United Kingdom for the tour, but the Damned, having scheduled a different opening act for their tour, was not expecting the Misfits' arrival. Nevertheless, the Damned's management booked the Misfits for the tour.

Problems soon arose for the Misfits—they did not receive any payment for performing on the tour, and they felt that the instruments and equipment supplied for them were substandard. The Misfits first opened for the Damned on November 23 at De Montfort Hall in Leicester, England. Not long after, the Misfits cancelled their remaining appearances on the Damned tour. On December 2, Danzig and then-Misfits guitarist Bobby Steele went to watch the Jam perform a concert at the Rainbow Theatre, where they were confronted by a group of skinheads. Steele left to find help from authorities, and Danzig armed himself with either a glass bottle or a broken shard of glass from one of the venue's windows. Both he and Steele were arrested, and they spent two nights in jail in Brixton, England.

According to Steele in 1993, "I just turned to Glenn [in the cell and] said, 'We should make a song about this called "London Dungeon"'. We were like sitting in this cell, it was like ten feet perfectly square, you know, solid painted walls, it was real echoey in the room [...] and we were just like slapping the beat out on our legs and humming [...] Glenn took it from there." Steele and Danzig were released from jail on December 4. On December 15, then-Misfits drummer Joey Image flew back to the United States by himself, effectively quitting the band. On December 18, the rest of the Misfits returned to New Jersey.

== Recording and release ==
"London Dungeon" was first recorded in August 1980 at Master Sound Productions in Franklin Square, New York, and was released as the A-side of the Misfits' EP 3 Hits from Hell in 1981. On their 1982 album Walk Among Us, as the track "Mommy Can I Go Out & Kill Tonight?" (which was recorded on December 17, 1981 at the Ritz in New York City) fades out, the opening of "London Dungeon" can be heard. "London Dungeon" was later reissued on the 1986 compilation album Misfits (also known as Collection I), which would later be included in the 1996 boxed set The Misfits.

== Critical reception ==
In 2012, Aaron Lariviere of Stereogum ranked "London Dungeon" No. 4 on his list of best Misfits songs, praising "The stuttering snare, the ominous bass, and that infectious, near-metal, goth-baiting guitar [...] Despite their origins and the roughshod execution of most of the songs, the Misfits were capable of serious songcraft, as proven here." In 2015, "London Dungeon" was ranked No. 71 by the staff of the British magazine Time Out on their list of best songs about London.

== Personnel ==
The Misfits

- Glenn Danzig – vocals
- Bobby Steele – guitar, backing vocals
- Jerry Only – bass guitar, backing vocals
- Arthur Googy – drums

Production

- Dave Achelis – engineering
- Rich Flores – mastering

== See also ==
- Misfits discography
