= The Ritz (rock club) =

Rock club in New York City

Coordinates: 40.73175°N 73.98912°W

The Ritz was a New York City rock club in the 1980s and early 1990s.

== History ==
The Ritz was founded in 1980 by Jerry Brandt in the historic Webster Hall ballroom and concert space located at 119 East 11th Street between Third and Fourth avenues in the East Village neighborhood of New York City. The Ritz focused primarily on live performances, often of newer acts, but also featured dancing. The Ritz was one of the first clubs to incorporate video screens into the club experience with a 30' screen and a projector which cost $120,000. MTV made its debut at The Ritz. In April 1989, The Ritz moved to the site of the former Studio 54 on 254 West 54th Street, where it was called "The New Ritz" and continued to host concerts until 1995. From 1990 onward it reverted to the name "The Ritz". The original 11th Street space reverted to the name Webster Hall after The Ritz relocated.

== MTV's "Live at The Ritz" ==
MTV aired a series of concerts called "Live at The Ritz" on Saturday nights in the 1980s. Performers included Guns N' Roses, Gene Loves Jezebel, the Saints, the Cult, Nik Kershaw, the Smithereens, Oingo Boingo, Julian Cope, Great White, Hoodoo Gurus, Pseudo Echo, White Lion, Iggy Pop, Eurogliders, Blancmange, and Simon Townshend.

== Public Image Limited appearance ==
The club received national attention after an antagonistic performance by Public Image Limited on May 15, 1981. They were a late substitution for Bow Wow Wow, who were originally scheduled to perform. The band was more interested in creating performance art than giving a traditional concert; to this end, they appeared onstage deliberately obscured by a projection screen and played their records through the club's public address system while playing entirely different music onstage. Taunted by lead singer John Lydon (formerly of the Sex Pistols), the Ritz's unhappy patrons rioted, throwing bottles and garbage cans, and pulling on the video screen that covered the front of the stage.

== Notable shows and recordings ==
- "Mommy, Can I Go Out & Kill Tonight", the only live track on the Misfits' album Walk Among Us, was recorded at The Ritz in 1981. Parts of Evilive were also recorded there in 1981.
- Rick Derringer recorded a Ritz show in 1982, released in 2009 as Rick Derringer's Rock Spectacular: Live at The Ritz, New York 1982, featuring guests Ted Nugent, Tim Bogert, Karla DeVito and Southside Johnny.
- The Michael Stanley Band recorded the live album Live at the Ritz at The Ritz on September 26–27, 1983.
- The Residents played in New York for the first time at The Ritz, on January 16–17, 1986. Their album 13th Anniversary Show - Ritz NY - Jan 16, 1986 was recorded there.
- Bo Diddley recorded Live at The Ritz with Ronnie Wood in 1987.
- The second disc of British metal band Venom's live double album, Eine kleine Nachtmusik, was recorded at The Ritz on April 4–5, 1986.
- D.R.I. recorded Live at The Ritz on June 27, 1987.
- Guns N' Roses recorded their February 2, 1988, concert for a live video
- The August 13, 1988, concert by Kiss was recorded and has been released several times on video, cd and vinyl
- White Lion made a television recording at the club in 1988. This concert was released as the second disc of the 2007 compilation The Definitive Rock Collection.
- "Memories Can't Wait" from the Living Colour EP Biscuits was recorded live at the club on April 22, 1989.
- Tin Machine (fronted by David Bowie) recorded a megamix video for their first album at the club, released in June 1989.
- The first US show for Sepultura was at The Ritz opening for King Diamond on October 31, 1989.
- Guns N' Roses played again at The Ritz on May 16, 1991, which was also recorded and it was part of the You Could be Mine music video.
- Stormtroopers of Death recorded Live at Budokan at The Ritz on March 21, 1992.
