= Skulls (Misfits song) =

Song by the Misfits

from the album Walk Among Us
- Released: March 1982
- Recorded: June–August 1981
- Genre: Punk rock; horror punk
- Length: 2:01
- Label: Ruby, Slash
- Songwriter: Glenn Danzig

"Skulls" is a song by the American punk rock band Misfits from the band's 1982 album Walk Among Us. The song was written by frontman and vocalist Glenn Danzig, and was later included on the 1986 compilation album Misfits (also known as Collection I), which itself was included as part of the 1996 boxed set The Misfits.

== Recording and release ==
"Skulls" was recorded at Mix-O-Lydian Studio in Boonton, New Jersey no later than August 1981. It was released on the Misfits' debut album Walk Among Us, which was first released in March 1982 through Ruby Records, an imprint of Slash Records. The song was later included on the 1986 compilation album Misfits (also known as Collection I). Every track on Collection I would later be included in the 1996 boxed set The Misfits.

== Critical reception ==
Aaron Lariviere of Stereogum ranked the track No. 3 on his list of the 10 best Misfits songs, writing that "It's essentially a wistful, yearning love song for your severed head", adding that "This is my favorite Misfits tune without question". In his book This Music Leaves Stains: The Complete Story of the Misfits, author James Greene, Jr. called the song a "thrashing delight" and "a twisted love letter", writing: "Danzig imbues so much passion into this performance [...] that one tends to forget the startling reality of his words". In his book The Complete Misfits Discography, author Robert Michael "Bobb" Cotter called it a "joyous ode to decapitation, and the perp's collection of the gruesome remnant, kind of like a punk-rock Predator." Andy Biersack, lead vocalist for the rock band Black Veil Brides, listed "Skulls" as being among his favorite Misfits songs.

== Covers ==
The Lemonheads recorded a "sensitive, folky" acoustic cover of the song on Favorite Spanish Dishes.

Duster recorded a slower version of the song, although it never saw release on a studio album.

== Personnel ==
The Misfits

- Glenn Danzig – vocals
- Jerry Only – bass
- Doyle – guitars
- Arthur Googy – drums

Production

- Mike Taylor – production
- The Misfits – production
- Pat Burnette – production

== See also ==
- Misfits discography
