= Hell on Earth: A Tribute to the Misfits =

Compilation album by Cleopatra Records
- Released: 2000
- Genre: Industrial rock, death metal, garage punk
- Label: Cleopatra

Misfits tributes chronology
Violent World: A Tribute to the Misfits (1997)	Hell on Earth: A Tribute to the Misfits (2000)	Fiend Club Lounge (2005)

Professional ratings
Review scores
Source	Rating
AllMusic	3/5 stars

Hell on Earth: A Tribute to the Misfits is a tribute album to the American horror punk band Misfits released in 2000 by Cleopatra Records. It features primarily industrial rock, death metal and garage punk bands performing cover versions of Misfits songs from the band's early era, 1977 to 1983. Except for Electric Hellfire Club's cover, all of these covers had been released on a previous Misfits tribute album titled Hell on Earth... Hail to Misfits in 1996.

== Track listing ==
All tracks are written by Glenn Danzig and originally performed by the Misfits

No.	Title	Artist	Length
1.	"Devil's Whorehouse"	Electric Hellfire Club	3:08
2.	"Hollywood Babylon"	Entombed	2:23
3.	"Teenagers from Mars"	Backyard Babies	3:09
4.	"Bullet"	The Hellacopters	1:36
5.	"Return of the Fly"	The 69 Eyes	2:01
6.	"Where Eagles Dare"	Troublemakers	1:53
7.	"Death Comes Ripping"	Wolfpack	2:05
8.	"Devil's Whorehouse"	Balzac	2:41
9.	"Night of the Living Dead"	The Robots	2:08
10.	"Green Hell"	Deranged	1:46
11.	"Ghouls Night Out"	Gehennah	1:36
12.	"Halloween II"	Tenebre	3:03
13.	"Demonomania"	Genocide SS	0:39
14.	"She"	Demons	1:47
