= Night of the Living Dead (song) =

Single by the Misfits
- B-side: "Where Eagles Dare"; "Rat Fink"
- Released: October 31, 1979
- Recorded: June 1979
- Genre: Horror punk
- Length: 5:43
- Label: Plan 9 (PL 1011)
- Songwriter: Glenn Danzig
- Producers: Danny Zelonky, The Misfits

Misfits singles chronology
| "Horror Business" (1979) | "Night of the Living Dead" (1979) | "Halloween" (1981) |

"Night of the Living Dead" is the fourth single by the horror punk band the Misfits. It was released on October 31, 1979, on singer Glenn Danzig's label Plan 9 Records. 2,000 copies of the single were pressed on black 7" vinyl. The night of its release the band performed at Irving Plaza in New York City and sold the single at the door.

"Night of the Living Dead" is titled after the 1968 horror film of the same name, and the song's lyrics address the zombie plot of the film: "You think you're a zombie, you think it's a scene/from some monster magazine/Open your eyes too late/This ain't no fantasy boy". A re-recording of the song was later included on the band's debut album, Walk Among Us. "Where Eagles Dare" shares its title with a 1968 war film. "Rat Fink" is a cover of a song by Allan Sherman from his 1963 album My Son, the Nut, which itself is a parody of "Rag Mop". It was the only cover song that the Misfits recorded during their early era, though it was credited on the single itself, and on later releases, to Danzig.

== Re-releases and other versions ==
Different versions of all three tracks appeared on compilation albums years after the original single went out of print. An alternate version of "Where Eagles Dare" was released on Legacy of Brutality in 1985, with overdubbed guitar and bass tracks recorded by Danzig. Different versions of "Night of the Living Dead" and "Where Eagles Dare" appeared on Misfits the following year, while "Rat Fink" appeared on Collection II in 1995. All three songs appeared, in all of their different versions and recordings, in The Misfits box set in 1996.

== Cover versions ==
"Night of the Living Dead" was covered by 88 Fingers Louie on their 1995 album Behind Bars, and by the Troublemakers on the 2000 Misfits tribute album Hell on Earth. "Where Eagles Dare" was covered by Therapy? on the 1997 tribute album Violent World, by The Robots on Hell on Earth, by Bratmobile on their The Real Janelle EP, by Sloppy Seconds as a 1987 single featuring Bobby Steele, and by No Fun At All on their 1997 EP "And Now For Something Completely Different".

== Track listing ==
Side A
| No. | Title | Writer(s) | Length |
|---|---|---|---|
| 1. | "Night of the Living Dead" | Glenn Danzig | 2:02 |

Side B
| No. | Title | Writer(s) | Length |
|---|---|---|---|
| 1. | "Where Eagles Dare" | Danzig | 1:51 |
| 2. | "Rat Fink" (originally performed by Allan Sherman) | Allan Sherman, Johnnie Lee Wills, Deacon Anderson | 1:50 |
| Total length: | | | 5:43 |

== Personnel ==
=== Band ===
- Glenn Danzig – vocals
- Bobby Steele – guitar, backing vocals
- Jerry Only – bass guitar, backing vocals
- Joey Image – drums

=== Production ===
- Wayne Vlcan – engineering
- Danny Zelonky – producing
