= Walk Among Us =

Studio album by the Misfits
- Released: March 1982
- Recorded: June, August, and December 1981 – January 1982
- Studios: Master Sound Productions, Mix-O-Lydian, Newfound Sound Studios
- Genres: Hardcore punk; horror punk
- Length: 24:38
- Label: Ruby
- Producer: Misfits

Misfits chronology
3 Hits from Hell (1981)	Walk Among Us (1982)	Evilive (1982)

Alternative cover
- 1988 reissue, with different color scheme

Walk Among Us is the debut studio album by the American punk rock band Misfits, released in March 1982 by Ruby Records and its parent label Slash Records. It was the first full-length album to be released by the band, although it was the third to be recorded, after Static Age and 12 Hits from Hell. The recording sessions for Walk Among Us took place at multiple studios between June 1981 and January 1982, and the album also includes the track "Mommy, Can I Go Out and Kill Tonight?", which was recorded live at the Ritz in New York City. The album features a re-recording of the single "Night of the Living Dead", which was released on October 31, 1979.

== Recording ==
Prior to Walk Among Us, the Misfits had recorded and shelved two full-length albums: Static Age, which was recorded in 1978 but would remain unreleased in its entirety until 1996, and 12 Hits from Hell, which was recorded in 1980 and has never received an official wide release. The recording sessions for Walk Among Us took place at multiple studios. The majority of the songs were recorded at Mix-O-Lydian Studio in Boonton, New Jersey no later than August 1981, and these sessions also produced the recordings for the group's single "Halloween".

The album's sixth track, "Hate Breeders", was recorded at Newfound Sound in Fair Lawn, New Jersey in June 1981. The seventh and only live track on the album, "Mommy, Can I Go Out & Kill Tonight", was recorded on December 17, 1981, at the Ritz in New York City. As the track fades out, the band can be heard beginning to play the song "London Dungeon", which was not included on the album in its entirety. Due to : "Not fitting in". In January 1982, overdubbing took place at Quad Teck in Los Angeles, California, where Misfits vocalist Glenn Danzig would also mix the tracks with both Chris Desjardins of the Flesh Eaters and Pat Burnette.

The track "Astro Zombies" takes its name from the title of the 1968 film The Astro-Zombies. Additionally, the album title was inspired by the 1956 film The Creature Walks Among Us.

== Cover artwork ==
The cover for Walk Among Us features flying saucers from the 1956 film Earth vs. the Flying Saucers, as well as the "Rat-Bat-Spider" creature from the 1959 film The Angry Red Planet. The first pressing of the album in the United States (as well as the Italian-issued import) featured cover artwork with a pink background and logo, whereas the second pressing of the album introduced a purple background, though the pink logo was retained. When the album was reissued in 1988, the cover artwork once again featured a purple background, but the band's logo was changed from pink to green. Reissues since 1988 in all formats have varied in usage of either the pink or purple covers. When the album was reissued in 2018 by Earache Records, the colors of the cover artwork were changed again, this time with a pink background and a green logo.

In a 2009 interview with Joe Matera, Danzig expressed his displeasure with the album's cover artwork, stating that "I remember I flipped out on our label because it was supposed to be in all these different colors such as red, black and orange but the way it came out was truly awful. But they had already printed them anyway, though they had not shown us any proofs beforehand".

== Release ==
"It's possibly an accurate number. Our record Out of Step has to have sold 15,000 [copies], and my perception is the Misfits were bigger than Minor Threat. I mean, some of the shows on the Walk Among Us tour were huge. They were playing to over a thousand people sometimes."

— Brian Baker of Minor Threat on Danzig's five-figure sales claims.

Walk Among Us was originally slated for release in 1981 on the band's own label, Plan 9 Records, but was neither pressed nor released due to a lack of financing. After several independent labels on the West Coast took interest in releasing the album, and it was released in the United States on 12" LP by Ruby Records, an imprint of Slash Records, in March 1982. The first pressing of Walk Among Us featured a pink background and logo, while the second pressing featured a purple background. Danzig began claiming as early as 1983 that Walk Among Us had sold over 20,000 copies, and that it sold even greater numbers in overseas markets. Chris Desjardins, who helped mix the album and who operated Ruby Records, has considered Danzig's claims about the album's sales figures to be most likely inaccurate, as the label's most successful releases at the time generally sold between 2,500 and 5,000 copies.

The album was reissued in 1988 on CD and cassette, this time with a green logo, and Warner Bros. circulated promotional copies of the album in approximately 3,000 custom Misfits Halloween bags that year. The album was released in Canada on LP by Slash/London Records in 1996. Until 2018, all official releases of Walk Among Us on vinyl or CD in the U.S. were issued through Ruby, Slash, or Warner Records/Rhino.

The album was reissued on November 30, 2018, by Earache Records with six limited-run variant colored pressings, identified by the catalog number MOSH666. The cover artwork for the Earache reissue features a pink background and a green logo, and the vinyl records within were available in a total of six colored variants, limited to 300 each: "'20 Eyes' Clear", "'Martian' Green", "'Devil's' Purple", "'Hatebreeder' Red", "'Hell' Orange", and "'Skull' White". Pre-orders for the reissued variants were first announced no later than October 2, 2018, and both the green and purple variants sold out by October 10, 2018.

== Critical reception ==
Professional ratings
Review scores
Source	Rating
AllMusic	4.5/5 stars
Pitchfork	9.4/10
Spin	4.5/5 stars
Spin Alternative Record Guide	8/10

In his book This Music Leaves Stains: The Complete Story of the Misfits, author James Green Jr writes that Walk Among Us was considered "an instant triumph" among Misfits fans upon its release, and that it was "the record everyone had patiently been waiting for since Beware and 'Horror Business'." In a May 1982 issue of Sounds, music journalist Tim Sommer described it as "a truly awesome album". Forced Exposure's review of the album stated: "Just [buy] this fuckin' record".

Ned Raggett of AllMusic gave the album a rating of 4.5 out of 5, writing that "Nearly every song on the album – 13 total, delivered in a light-speed 25 minutes – is a twisted classic, with the band's trademark '50s/'60s melodies run through a punk/metal meatgrinder on full display". Raggett also wrote that the album "became a legendary effort of U.S. punk, the more so because it so willfully violated many [of punk's] rules" at the time of its release, noting that the album is "[u]tterly devoid of political confrontation or social uplift".

Jason Heller of Pitchfork gave the album a rating of 9.4 out of 10, praising the "insidiously catchy" nature of the songs and writing: "This album is a work of feverish imagination, but it's in no way escapist [... Danzig] sings of butchering people and keeping their body parts even as the names Ted Bundy and John Wayne Gacy sent chills down the spine of a nation. [...] Neither glorifying nor condemning, Misfits simply distilled the anxieties of the early '80s into a putrid elixir." Doug Brod of Spin gave the album 4 out of 5 stars, writing that the album's tracks "perfectly capture [the Misfits'] danse macabre before the tempos quickened and the choruses became scarce on 1983's Earth A.D.". In his book The Complete Misfits Discography, author Robert Michael "Bobb" Cotter calls Walk Among Us "one of the greatest officially released punk albums of all time."

Guitarist Jay Yuenger of the heavy metal band White Zombie called Walk Among Us "the definitive statement" from the Misfits, noting its "dangerous sound with sweet melodies [...] it's just so unique, and so uniquely American. It made a huge impact on everyone I knew." Vocalist Dave Brockie of the heavy metal band Gwar called Walk Among Us a "nearly perfect album".

Rolling Stone ranked the album Number 32 on its list of the 40 greatest punk rock albums of all time. In 2024, Loudwire staff elected it as the best hard rock album of 1982.

== Track listing ==
All tracks are written by Glenn Danzig.

Side A
No.	Title	Length
1.	"20 Eyes"	1:41
2.	"I Turned into a Martian"	1:41
3.	"All Hell Breaks Loose"	1:47
4.	"Vampira"	1:26
5.	"Nike A Go Go"	2:16
6.	"Hatebreeders"	3:08
7.	"Mommy, Can I Go Out & Kill Tonight" (live)	2:01

Side B
No.	Title	Length
1.	"Night of the Living Dead"	1:57
2.	"Skulls"	2:00
3.	"Violent World"	1:46
4.	"Devils Whorehouse"	1:45
5.	"Astro Zombies"	2:14
6.	"Braineaters"	0:56
Total length:		24:38

== Personnel ==
Personnel taken from Walk Among Us liner notes, except where noted.

Misfits

- Glenn Danzig – vocals
- Doyle – guitar
- Jerry Only – bass
- Arthur Googy – drums

Production

- Mike Taylor – producer
- Misfits – producers
- Pat Burnette – producer
