= 1.6 Band =

American hardcore punk band

- Origin: Holbrook, New York, United States
- Genres: Hardcore punk
- Years active: 1989–1993, 2009–present
- Labels: Gern Blandsten
- Members: Kevin Egan; Lance Jaeger; Vin Novara; Mike Yanicelli

1.6 Band was an American hardcore punk band consisting of Kevin Egan (formerly of Beyond, later with The Last Crime, $24,000), Lance Jaeger (also of Beyond), Vin Novara (later with Crownhate Ruin, Canyon, Gena Rowlands Band, Alarms & Controls), and Mike Yanicelli (later with Die 116, Moses, and various bluegrass bands in New Jersey).

== Early history ==
The band was originally formed in 1989 by Jaeger, Novara, and Yanicelli in Holbrook, Long Island, New York, with an assortment of other musicians attempting a variety of music styles. Early in 1991, they began writing and recording with Egan, soon after adopting the name 1.6 Band. Following the demo recording of all new songs written with Egan, they played their first show at a backyard party in Lake Ronkonkoma, New York in July 1991.

During the fall of 1991 they recorded their first EP, 1.6 Band (a.k.a. "Tongue Family Style"), with Wharton Tiers. For the rest of 1991 and much of 1992, 1.6 Band performed extensively on the east coast of the US in a series of two-to-three show road trips. Before Novara relocated to the Maryland suburbs of Washington DC in September 1992 to finish college, the group recorded their only LP, again with Tiers. Concurrently, Yanicelli began playing in Die 116, leaving that group within a year.

The summer of 1993 brought more short road trips and another EP recorded with Tiers, Pimpin' Ain't Easy. 1.6 Band played their last show of that era in Washington, DC at the Beta-Punks Warehouse in October 1993.

== Reunion ==
In 2009 the band reunited to write new music and for select shows. After playing live with the likes of Rorschach, they recorded four new songs with Chris Pierce at Technical Ecstasy, which resulted in the Checkered Past of All Things Present EP released by Metastasis Records.

== Reaction ==
The Guardian described the band as "surprisingly musical, like the Minutemen in a very, very bad mood", referring to the 1980s punk band. All Music Guide claims: "1.6 Band isn't the first group mentioned when '90s hardcore comes up, but, after a few listens to this disc [1.6 Band Broke Up], it may seem like they deserve a little more credit than they've received."

== Discography ==
=== Albums ===
- 1.6 Band (Gern Blandsten LP, 1993)
- Broke Up (Gern Blandsten CD, 1996)

=== EPs ===
- 1.6 Band [a.k.a. "Tongue Family Style"] (Sunspot, 1992)
- Split with Rorschach (Chainsaw Safety, 1993)
- Pimpin' Ain't Easy (Wardance, 1994)
- The Checkered Past of All Kings Present (Metastasis Records, 2010)

=== Compilations ===
- Various artists. Fear of the Smell (Vermiform Records, 1992), includes earlier version of the song "Throwing Rocks," which 1.6 Band later re-recorded for their s/t LP
- Various artists. Emo – iTunes Essentials, (iTunes/Apple Computers, 2006), includes "These Giants" from their s/t LP
