= Rorschach (band) =

American hardcore punk band

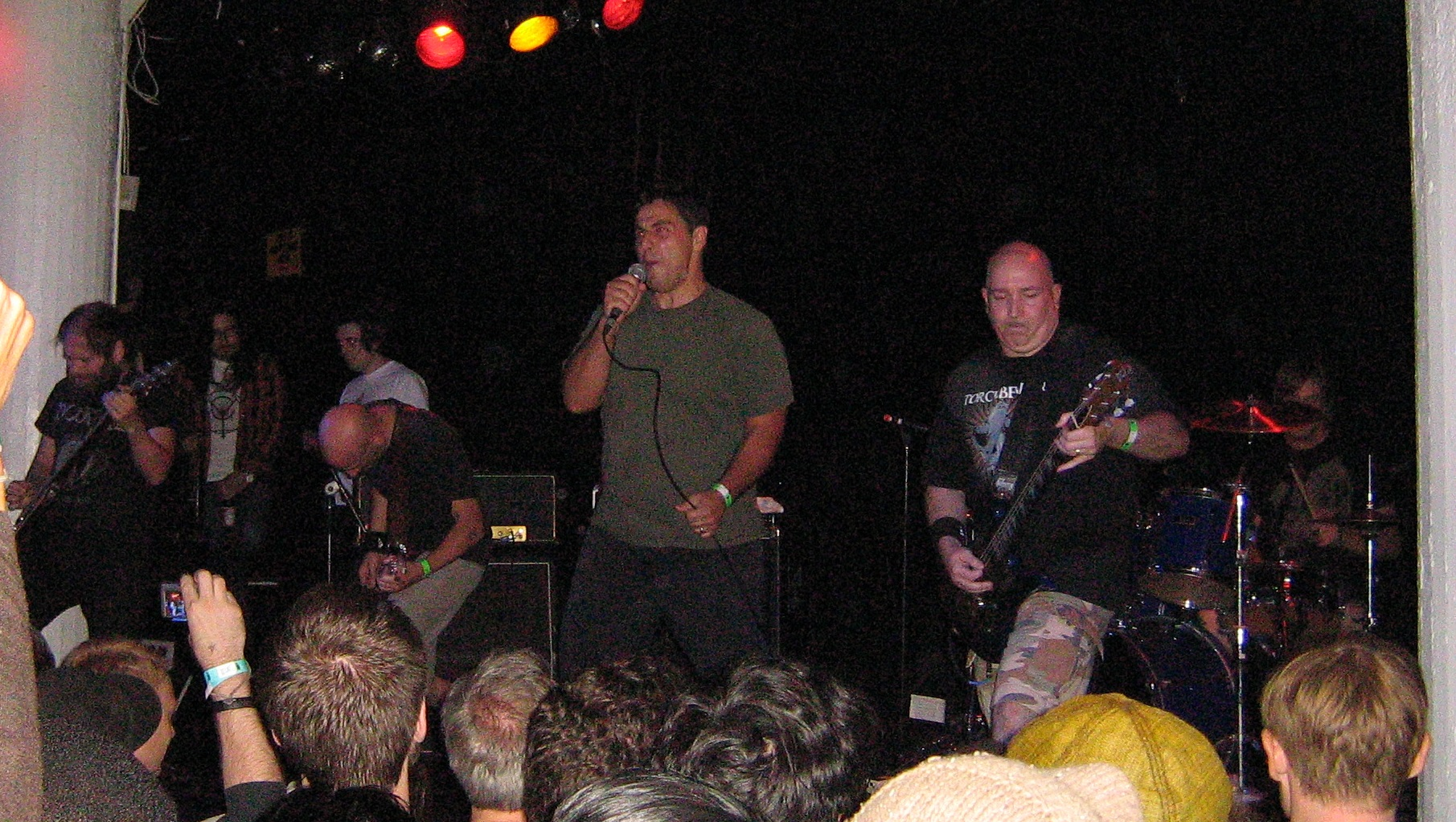
- Rorschach live in New York City in 2009

Background information
- Origin: New Jersey, U.S.
- Genres: Hardcore punk; metalcore
- Years active: 1989–1993, 2009–2012
- Labels: Gern Blandsten; Chainsaw Safety; Old Glory; Vermiform; Wardance
- Spinoffs: Deadguy, Kiss It Goodbye
- Past members: Charles Maggio; Andrew Gormley; Nick Forte; Keith Huckins; Chris Laucella; Thom Rusnak

Rorschach was an American hardcore punk band from New Jersey that existed from 1989 to 1993 and again from 2009 to 2012. Their typical blend of hardcore with dissonant metal elements provided an inspiration to many later metalcore and post-hardcore bands.

== History ==
The first release by the band, Remain Sedate, shows the band's sound at a stage when they played fast, heavy hardcore with a metal slant and raspy hardcore vocals. At this time they also drew heavy comparisons to Die Kreuzen for their bizarre chord progressions and Charles Maggio's unearthly howl. However, as the band progressed, they developed a slower, more sinister, sludge sound that was influenced by New York band Swans. Additionally, the vocals developed into high-pitched, tortured screaming rather than shouting, due in part to voice problems Maggio was experiencing at the time. This change in sound can be heard primarily on their second full-length release, Protestant. Shortly after issuing this album, the group disbanded, some members eventually joining Deadguy and Kiss It Goodbye.

Rorschach has performed occasional reunion shows from 2009 through 2012.

In the 2012 film Zero Dark Thirty, the Rorschach song "Pavlov's Dogs" is used to torture suspected terrorists.

== Musical style and legacy ==
Critics have categorized Rorschach's music as hardcore punk and metalcore. They incorporated elements of powerviolence.

Rorschach have cited influences including Neurosis, Blast, Die Kreuzen, Black Flag, Cro-Mags, Prong, Voivod, Metallica, Slayer, Born Against, Burn, Citizen's Arrest, Raw Deal, Breakdown, Underdog, Sick of it All, Youth of Today and Corrosion of Conformity.

Rorschach helped to pioneer the metalcore genre, with their take on the genre being more dissonant than their contemporaries. During the early 1990s, their style was somestimes called "noisecore". They were major influence upon the development of screamo and mathcore. Alongside Heroin, Downcast, Born Against, Econochrist, 1.6 Band and Merel, they influenced a wave of bands in the early 1990s to push Revolution Summer emo into more extreme directions, which included Chino Horde, Policy of 3, Native Nod and Still Life.

Rorschach have been cited as an influence by Starkweather, Coalesce, Converge, Cave In, Jeromes Dream, Off Minor, Pg.99 and Saetia.

== Members ==
Final line-up

- Charles Maggio – vocals (1989–1993, 2009–2012)
- Keith Huckins – guitar (1989–1993, 2009–2012)
- Nick Forté – guitar (1989–1993, 2009–2012)
- Andrew Gormley – drums (1989–1993, 2009–2012)
- Tom Rusnak – bass (1991–1993, 2009–2012)

Previous members

- Chris Laucella – bass (1989–1991)

== Discography ==
Year	Album	Type	Label
1990	Remain Sedate	Studio album	Vermiform Records
1991	Needlepack	EP	Wardance Records
1991	Split w/ Neanderthal	EP	Vermiform Records
1993	Protestant	Studio album	Gern Blandsten Records
1993	Close Your Eyes and See Death	Live album	Como Caca! Edizioni
1993	Split w/ Operation Mindfuck	EP	Lund Castle Core Records
1994	Split w/ 1.6 Band	EP	Chainsaw Safety
1995	Autopsy	Compilation album	Gern Blandsten Records
2009	Remain Sedate/Protestant	Compilation album	Gern Blandsten Records

=== Compilation appearances ===
- God's Chosen People (1993, Old Glory)
- Fear of Smell 12" (1993, Vermiform)
- Look At All The Children Now (1990, Evacuate)
- Forever 7" (1990)

== Related bands ==
- Computer Cougar - Charles Maggio, Nick Forte
- Deadguy - Keith Huckins
- Die 116 - Andrew Gormley
- Kiss It Goodbye - Andrew Gormley, Keith Huckins, Thom Rusnak
- Playing Enemy - Andrew Gormley, Thom Rusnak
- Shai Hulud - Andrew Gormley
- Radio To Saturn - Nick Forte
- Bone of Contention - Keith Huckins, Charles Maggio
