= Kiss It Goodbye =

American hardcore punk band

- Origin: Seattle, Washington
- Genres: Metalcore; mathcore; hardcore punk; noise rock
- Years active: 1996–1998, 2012, 2025
- Label: Revelation Records
- Members: Tim Singer; Keith Huckins; Thom Rusnak; Andrew Gormley
- Past members: Demian Johnston; Eric Cooper; Alex Miller; Neal Witmer

Kiss it Goodbye was an American metalcore band from Seattle that formed in 1996 and broke-up in 1998.

== History ==
After leaving the New Jersey band Deadguy in 1996, vocalist Tim Singer and guitarist Keith Huckins moved on to form Kiss it Goodbye with bassist Thom Rusnak and drummer Andrew Gormley. Huckins, Rusnak and Gormley were already familiar musically as they had all previously performed together in the New Jersey band Rorschach.

A demo tape titled Be Afraid was quickly recorded and heavily circulated around the New York City area which responded with high praise. The demo is the only recording made by the group to feature guitarist Eric Cooper. The band recorded their 1997 debut LP She Loves Me, She Loves Me Not for Revelation Records. Produced by Billy Anderson, the album had the same familiar sound that fans of Deadguy and Rorschach had come to know along with Singer's melodramatic screams and ramblings. The tracks "Preacher" and "Target Practice" which were omitted from She Loves Me, She Loves Me Not were also released this same year as a 7-inch EP through Revelation.

In 1997, the band toured with Unsane. They also toured with death metal outfit Obituary. After touring was completed, Huckins decided the touring and music were no longer to his liking and left the band. He was replaced by Seattle hardcore veteran and Kiss It Goodbye illustrator Demian "Headboy" Johnston.

In 1998, the band recorded material for a Sub Pop Records EP that went unreleased due to Tim Singer leaving the band, ultimately leading to its breakup. The tracks were later released by Revelation Records as the Choke CD/7" EP.

The band briefly reunited in 2012 for a week long West Coast reunion tour after 14 years of failed attempts. The reunion lineup consisted of vocalist Tim Singer, bassist Thom Rusnak, guitarist Alex Miller, and drummer Neal Witmer. In coordination with the tour, Revelation Records re-released She Loves Me, She Loves Me Not on vinyl. The band would also do another one-off reunion on June 13, 2025, at Rich Hall Forever in Brooklyn with the She Loves Me, She Loves Me Not lineup.

== Band members ==
- Andrew Gormley – drums (1996-1998, 2025)
- Neal Witmer – drums (2012)
- Thom Rusnak – bass (1996-1998, 2012, 2025)
- Tim Singer - vocals (1996-1998, 2012, 2025)
- Keith Huckins – guitar (1996-1997, 2025)
- Demian Johnston – guitar (1997-1998)
- Eric Cooper – guitar (1996)
- Alex Miller – guitar (2012)

== Discography ==
Studio albums

- She Loves Me, She Loves Me Not LP/CD (1997, Revelation Records)

Singles and EPs

- Be Afraid demo tape (1996, self-released)
- Preacher/Target Practice 7-inch (1997, Revelation Records)
- Choke 7-inch/CDEP (1999, Revelation Records)
