= Sunspot Records =

- Founded: 1991
- Founder: Bryan Wassom
- Defunct: 1994
- Status: Defunct
- Country of origin: U.S.
- Location: Arlington, Virginia

Sunspot Records was a small independent record label in Arlington, Virginia, that existed in the early nineties. The Sunspot roster included bands primarily from the east coast of the U.S. Several of these bands such as Avail, Shades Apart, 1.6 Band, and Fly (pre Trans-Am) went on to have successful music careers. The label was founded, owned, and operated by Bryan Wassom until it closed in 1994.

== Discography ==
- Sunspot 1: Ordeal 7-inch EP (500 pressed)
- Sunspot 2: Avail 7-inch EP Who's to Say...What Stays the Same (1000 pressed/3 colors vinyl/3 covers)
- Sunspot 3: Shades Apart 12-inch EP Dude Danger (1000 pressed) and re-pressed by the band
- Sunspot 4: Fly 7-inch EP (1000 pressed)
- Sunspot 5: 1.6 Band 7-inch EP Your Restaurant (1000 pressed) and re-pressed on Gern Blandsten Records
- Sunspot 6: Fine Day 7-inch (1000 pressed)
- Sunspot 7: Groove 7-inch (1000 pressed)
