= Evilive =

1982 live album by the Misfits

EP by the Misfits
- Released: December 1982
- Recorded: November 20 & December 17, 1981
- Genre: Horror punk
- Length: 13:00
- Label: Plan 9
- Producer: The Misfits

Misfits chronology
Walk Among Us (1982)	Evilive (1982)	Earth A.D./Wolfs Blood (1983)

Evilive

Live album by the Misfits
- Released: October 1987
- Recorded: November 20 & December 17, 1981
- Genre: Horror punk
- Length: 23:41
- Label: Plan 9
- Producer: The Misfits

Misfits chronology
Misfits (1986)	Evilive (1987)	Collection II (1995)

Professional ratings
Review scores
Source	Rating
AllMusic	3/5 stars
Spin Alternative Record Guide	3/10

Evilive is a live album by the American punk rock band Misfits. It was initially released as a 7-song EP in December 1982 and later added 5 more songs and released as an album in October 1987. It was released on frontman Glenn Danzig's Plan 9 Records. The title of the album is a palindrome. The album is included in the Misfits' Box Set. There is a record company owned by Glenn Danzig under the same name.

== Track listing ==
=== EP version ===
All tracks are written by Glenn Danzig.

Side A
No.	Title	Length
1.	"20 Eyes"	1:55
2.	"Night of the Living Dead"	1:43
3.	"Astro Zombies"	2:03
4.	"Horror Business"	2:05

Side B
No.	Title	Length
1.	"London Dungeon"	2:14
2.	"All Hell Breaks Loose"	1:33
3.	"We Are 138"	1:27
Total length:		13:00

- Side A and track 1 of side B recorded December 17, 1981, at The Ritz in New York City.
- Tracks 2 and 3 of side B recorded November 20, 1981, at On Broadway in San Francisco.

=== Album version ===
All tracks are written by Glenn Danzig.

No.	Title	Length
1.	"20 Eyes"	1:55
2.	"Night of the Living Dead"	1:43
3.	"Astro Zombies"	2:03
4.	"Horror Business"	2:05
5.	"London Dungeon"	2:14
6.	"Nike-A-Go-Go"	3:22
7.	"Hatebreeders"	2:39
8.	"Devil's Whorehouse"	1:40
9.	"All Hell Breaks Loose"	1:33
10.	"Horror Hotel"	1:12
11.	"Ghouls Night Out"	1:42
12.	"We Are 138"	1:27

- Tracks 1–7 recorded December 17, 1981, at The Ritz in New York City.
- Tracks 8–12 recorded November 20, 1981, at On Broadway in San Francisco.

== Personnel ==
=== Band ===
- Glenn Danzig – vocals
- Doyle – guitar
- Jerry Only – bass guitar, backing vocals
- Arthur Googy – drums

=== Additional musicians ===
- Henry Rollins – backing vocals on "We Are 138"
