= All Hell Breaks Loose =

All Hell Breaks Loose may refer to:

- All Hell Breaks Loose (Black Star Riders album), an album by Black Star Riders
- All Hell Breaks Loose (Destruction album), an album by Destruction
- "All Hell Breaks Loose" (Charmed), the finale of the third season of the TV series Charmed
- "All Hell Breaks Loose" (Hell's Kitchen), a TV episode on Season 20
- "All Hell Breaks Loose" (Supernatural), the two-part finale of the second season of the TV series Supernatural
- All Hell Breaks Loose (film), a 2014 American film
- "All Hell Breaks Loose", a song by The Misfits from the album Walk Among Us
- South Park: All Hell Breaks Loose, the original name for the film South Park: Bigger, Longer & Uncut

== See also ==
- All Hell Broke Loose, a 1995 Israeli documentary
- All Hell, a 2016 album by Vanna
- All Hell (Los Campesinos! album), 2024
- Hell Breaks Loose
