= She Loves Me, She Loves Me Not =

She Loves Me, She Loves Me Not...

Studio album by Kiss It Goodbye
- Released: April 1, 1997
- Recorded: November 1996
- Studio: Ironwood Studios (Seattle)
- Genres: Metalcore, mathcore, hardcore punk, noise rock
- Length: 45:27
- Label: Revelation Records
- Producer: Billy Anderson

Kiss It Goodbye chronology
Be Afraid (1996)	She Loves Me, She Loves Me Not... (1997)	Choke (1999)

Professional ratings
Review scores
Source	Rating
Allmusic	4/5 stars
Chronicles of Chaos	9/10 stars
Scene Point Blank	9.5/10 stars

She Loves Me, She Loves Me Not is the sole studio album by American metalcore band Kiss It Goodbye, released on April 1, 1997 though Revelation Records. The album was repressed on vinyl format in 2012 to celebrate the band's short 2012 reunion tour.

It was listed as the 17th Terrorizer 'Albums Of The Year' in 1997, and 13th in CMJ's 'Metal Top 25' for July 1997.

== Track listing ==
No.	Title	Length
1.	"Helvetica"	4:00
2.	"Hartley"	5:36
3.	"Fire Drill"	1:57
4.	"What If"	4:35
5.	"We'll Burn That Bridge When We Get to It"	5:35
6.	"Ammunition"	6:32
7.	"Man Thing"	3:22
8.	"Sick Day"	8:31
9.	"Put Your Head Down and Run"	5:19
Total length:		45:27

== Personnel ==
- Tim Singer – vocals, layout
- Keith Huckins – guitar
- Thom Rusnack – bass
- Andrew Gormley – drums
- Demain Johnston – artwork
- Billy Anderson – production, engineering
- Floyd Reitsman – engineering
- Jeff Job – engineering
- George Horn – mastering
