= Shades Apart =

American rock band

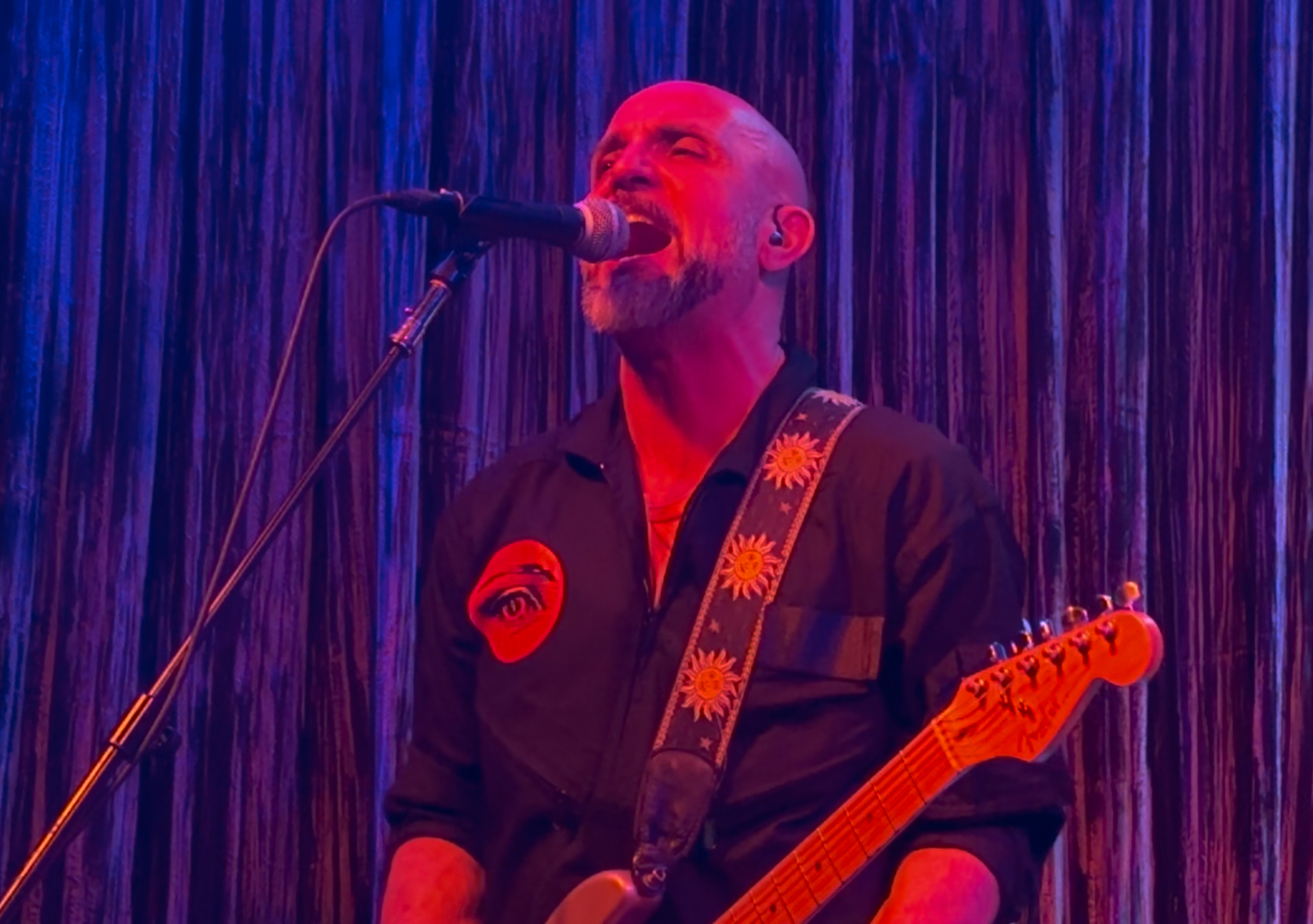
- Mark Vecchiarelli of Shades Apart in 2025

Background information
- Origin: Bridgewater Township, New Jersey, U.S.
- Genres: Alternative rock; hardcore punk
- Years active: 1988–2003, 2012–present
- Labels: Revelation; Universal
- Members: Mark Vecchiarelli; Kevin Lynch; Ed Brown

Shades Apart is an American alternative rock band from Bridgewater Township, New Jersey. They are best known for their singles "Valentine" and "Stranger by the Day" as well as their cover of "Tainted Love."

== History ==
Shades Apart formed in 1988, self-releasing an album that year; two EPs followed in 1992 and 1993. 1995, they issued Save It, produced by Bill Stevenson and Stephen Egerton, which resulted in media exposure due to the success of their cover of Gloria Jones' "Tainted Love". The song would later be featured multiple times in the 2004 movie She's Too Young. After another independent release in 1997, the band signed to Universal, who released Eyewitness in 1999 and Sonic Boom in 2001. In 1999, the single "Valentine" peaked at No. 31 on Billboard's Mainstream Rock Tracks chart. It also appeared on the Active Rock, Heritage Rock, and Mainstream Rock Audience charts. Their song "Stranger by the Day" was featured in the film American Pie and is on the soundtrack.

== Members ==
- Mark Vecchiarelli – guitar, vocals
- Kevin Lynch – bass, background vocals
- Ed Brown – drums

== Discography ==
- Shades Apart (Wishingwell Records, 1988)
- Dude Danger EP (Sunspot Records, 1992)
- Neon (Skene! Records, 1993)
- Save It (Revelation, 1995)
- "Tainted Love" CD single (1995, Revelation 40 PR1)
- Seeing Things (Revelation, 1997)
- Eyewitness (Universal, 1999)
- Sonic Boom (Universal, 2001)
- Eternal Echo (Hellminded Records, 2020)

=== Compilation appearances ===
- In-Flight Program CD (1997, Revelation REV050)
  - Track 05 – "Fearless"
- Music from the Motion Picture American Pie CD (1999, Uptown/Universal)
  - Track 08 – "Stranger by the Day"
- Revelation 100: 15 Year Retrospective Of Rare Recordings CD/LP (2002, Revelation REV100)
  - Track 07 – "Under The Sun"
- Violent World: A Tribute to The Misfits CD (1997, Caroline)
  - Track 03 – "20 Eyes"
- The Blasting Room CD (2000, Owned & Operated Recordings – O&O 008-2)
  - Track 03 – "Blame"
