= Joey Image =

American drummer (1957–2020)

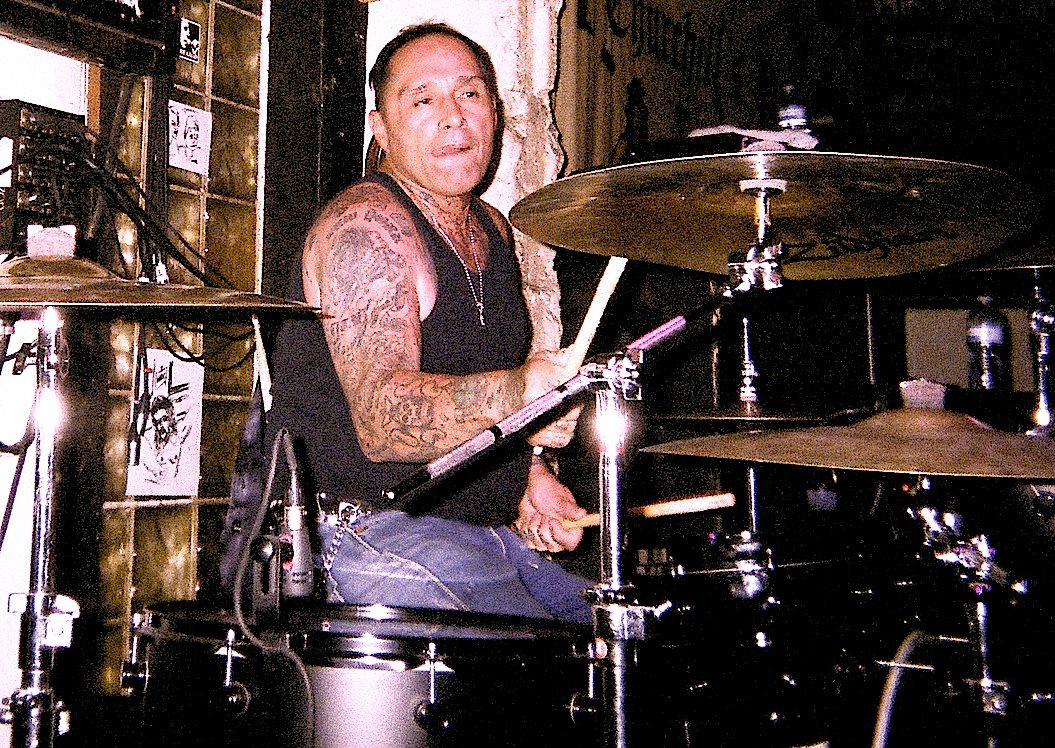
- Joey Image in 2014

Background information
- Born: Joey Poole; March 5, 1957
- Origin: Weehawken, New Jersey
- Died: June 1, 2020 (aged 63)
- Genres: Punk rock
- Occupation: Musician
- Instrument: Drums
- Years active: 1977–2020

Joey Poole (March 5, 1957 – June 1, 2020), known professionally as Joey Image, was an American punk rock drummer. He joined the Misfits in November 1978. He was the drummer for both the "Horror Business" and "Night of the Living Dead" sessions of 1979.

In December 1979, after the band's ill-fated tour of England with the Damned, he left the band. After the Misfits, he was the drummer for the Whorelords. His most recent bands were Human Buffet, Psycho Daisies, the Mary Tyler Whores, the Strap-Ons, the Bell Ringers, Evil Doers, the Hooples, Jersey Trash, the Hollywood 77's, and between 2000 and 2002 he was the drummer for the Undead.

He also played for the Misfits on October 26, 2000, at Culture Room, Fort Lauderdale, Florida, one day after Dr. Chud had left the band along with Michale Graves. As the band had no drummer and was playing in the same area as Joey, Jerry Only decided to call him to play some songs such as "Horror Business", "We Are 138", "Attitude", "Teenagers From Mars", "Hollywood Babylon", "London Dungeon", and "Where Eagles Dare". Eric Arce from Murphy's Law played the rest of the setlist songs.

== Personal life ==
Image spent most of his life in New York City, and later in Florida. Some time after his 1979 departure from the Misfits, Image married actress and model Patty Mullen and in 2003, he moved to Los Angeles, California. As of 2007, he had relocated to South Florida. In 2016, he was diagnosed with liver cancer and died on June 1, 2020.

== Misfits discography ==
- "Horror Business" (1979) - EP
- "Night of the Living Dead" (1979) - single
- Legacy of Brutality Tracks 9 and 10
- Misfits Tracks 4 through 8
- Collection II Tracks 6 and 7
- Beware (EP) Tracks 5 and 6
- The Misfits Disc 1-Tracks 3, 4, 5, 6, 7, 16, 25 / Disc 2-Tracks 9 and 10 / Disc 3-Tracks 3 through 14
