= Violent World: A Tribute to the Misfits =

Compilation album by Caroline Records
- Released: February 11, 1997
- Genre: Horror punk
- Length: 30:21
- Label: Caroline
- Producer: Tom Bejgrowicz

Misfits tributes chronology
Violent World: A Tribute to the Misfits (1997)	Hell on Earth: A Tribute to the Misfits (2000)

Professional ratings
Review scores
Source	Rating
AllMusic	2.5/5 stars

Violent World: A Tribute to the Misfits is a tribute album to the American horror punk band Misfits released in 1997 by Caroline Records. It features primarily punk rock bands performing cover versions of Misfits songs from the band's early era, 1977 to 1983.

== Track listing ==
All tracks are written by Glenn Danzig and originally performed by the Misfits.

No.	Title	Artist	Length
1.	"She"	Snapcase	1:16
2.	"Astro Zombies"	Pennywise	1:48
3.	"20 Eyes"	Shades Apart	2:26
4.	"TV Casualty"	Tanner	2:23
5.	"Where Eagles Dare"	Therapy?	2:29
6.	"London Dungeon"	Prong	3:38
7.	"Death Comes Ripping"	108	1:58
8.	"Mommy, Can I Go Out and Kill Tonight?"	The Bouncing Souls	1:58
9.	"Ghouls Night Out"	Goldfinger	1:44
10.	"Horror Business"	Deadguy	2:24
11.	"All Hell Breaks Loose"	Sick of It All	2:16
12.	"Last Caress"	NOFX	1:31
13.	"Earth A.D."	Earth Crisis	2:50
14.	"Return of the Fly"	Farside	1:50
Total length:			30:21
