= Vampira =

Vampira may refer to:

== Film ==
- Maila Nurmi (1922–2008), 1950s TV horror hostess and star of the 1959 film Plan 9 from Outer Space, who performed under the name "Vampira"
  - The Vampira Show, the Emmy-nominated TV show that she hosted
- Vampira (1974 film) (also known as Old Dracula), a 1974 comedy film
- Vampira (1994 film)

== Song ==
- "Vampira", a song by Commander Cody of Commander Cody and His Lost Planet Airmen on his 1978 album Flying Dreams
- "Vampira", a song about Maila Nurmi's character by Glenn Danzig, recorded several times by The Misfits and first released on the 1982 album Walk Among Us
- "Vampira", a song by Devin Townsend on the 2006 album Synchestra

== Character ==
- "Vampira", character in the comic Captain Marvel, Jr., issue #116, December 1952.
- "Vampira", character in the 1980 cartoon series Drak Pack
