= Where Eagles Dare (song) =

Single by the Misfits
- A-side: "Night of the Living Dead"
- Released: October 31, 1979
- Recorded: June 1979; The Song Shop, New York, New York
- Genre: Punk rock; hardcore punk; horror punk
- Length: 2:08
- Label: Plan 9
- Songwriter: Glenn Danzig
- Producer: Danny Zelonky

"Where Eagles Dare" is a song by the American punk rock band Misfits. Written by frontman and vocalist Glenn Danzig, the song was recorded and first released in 1979, alongside the track "Rat Fink", as the B-side of the band's single "Night of the Living Dead". "Where Eagles Dare" was later included on the 1986 compilation album Misfits, also known as Collection I. A version of the song was also included on the compilation album Legacy of Brutality, which was released in 1985.

== Recording and release ==
"Where Eagles Dare" was first recorded by the Misfits in January–February 1979 at C.I. Studios in New York. It was recorded again in June 1979 at the Song Shop, with Danny Zelonky producing. The Song Shop recording of "Where Eagles Dare" was released alongside the song "Rat Fink" as the B-side of the band's single "Night of the Living Dead", which was issued on October 31, 1979. The single, which was issued through Glenn Danzig's own label Plan 9 Records, consisted of 2,000 copies. Due to a mastering error, the songs on the single had an especially bass-heavy sound.

A version of "Where Eagles Dare", which was remixed exclusively by Danzig, was included on the 1985 compilation album Legacy of Brutality. The song was remixed again for its inclusion on the 1986 compilation album Misfits (also known as Collection I), a process which fixed the mastering error present on the "Night of the Living Dead" single. This "proper" remix, along with the rest of the songs featured on Collection I, was included in the 1996 box set The Misfits.

== Critical reception ==
In his book This Music Leaves Stains: The Complete Story of the Misfits, author James Greene, Jr. calls the song "a crude pounder whose blustery chorus challenges you to take it seriously". Dan Ozzi of Diffuser.fm ranked the song #2 on his list of the 10 best Misfits songs, referring to the line "I ain't no goddamn son of a bitch / You better think about it, baby!" as being "one of the most well-known lyrics in punk rock history [... and] man, is it fun to sing." Aaron Lariviere of Stereogum ranked the song #5 on his list of the 10 best Misfits songs, writing that "there's no question the song is gold, to the point where the phrase 'goddamn son of a bitch' has become indelibly linked with the band."

The song is featured in the films Jackass Forever and Thanksgiving.

== Personnel ==
The Misfits

- Glenn Danzig – vocals
- Jerry Only – bass
- Bobby Steele – guitar
- Joey Image – drums

Production

- Danny Zelonky – producer
- Wayne Vlcan – engineer

== Cover versions ==
"Where Eagles Dare" has been covered by such bands and artists as Bratmobile, Katy Goodman and Greta Morgan, Mac DeMarco, No Fun at All and Atom and His Package. The Nutley Brass recorded an instrumental lounge cover of the song for their 2005 Misfits tribute album Fiend Club Lounge. Joe Pierce released a cover version on Halloween 2020

== See also ==
- Misfits discography
