= Hybrid Moments =

Song by the Misfits

from the album Static Age
- Released: February 27, 1996
- Recorded: January–February 1978
- Genre: Punk rock; horror punk
- Length: 1:42
- Label: Caroline
- Songwriter: Glenn Danzig
- Producers: Dave Achelis; Tom Bejgrowicz

Audio sample
- "Hybrid Moments": file; help

"Hybrid Moments" is a song by the American punk rock band Misfits, recorded in 1978 for their proposed debut album Static Age. The song remained unreleased until 1985, when a remixed version of the song appeared on the compilation album Legacy of Brutality. The original recording was re-released on the 1996 boxed set The Misfits. The song is written by frontman and vocalist Glenn Danzig.

== Recording and release ==
"Hybrid Moments" was one of a number of songs recorded by the Misfits in January–February 1978 for their proposed album Static Age, which would remain unreleased in its entirety until 1996. It was recorded in C.I. Studios in New York, New York. The song was first made officially available on the compilation album Legacy of Brutality, released in 1985, as a remix by Danzig of the original 1978 recording. This was because Danzig exclusively mixed, produced, and performed overdubs for most of the songs on Legacy of Brutality himself without consulting his former bandmates. The original version of "Hybrid Moments" was included on the 1996 release of Static Age as part of the boxed set The Misfits, and would appear on the 1997 release of Static Age as well.

== Critical reception ==
In his book This Music Leaves Stains: The Complete Story of the Misfits, James Greene, Jr. writes that the song "owes much of its romantic drama to the touch of Roy Orbison but serves a swinging rock bravado all its own, finding a great middle ground between a vintage 1950s melodic approach with the weighty sensibilities of Black Sabbath." Maggie Serota of Pitchfork also compared Danzig's vocals to those of Orbison, writing that "It takes a real commitment to the bit to croon the line, 'When new creatures rape your face/Hybrids opened up the door,' [...] and make it sound like it was plucked from a Roy Orbison ballad rather than a deleted Simon and Hecubus sketch from The Kids in the Hall."

Aaron Lariviere of Stereogum ranked the song #6 on his list of the 10 best Misfits songs, calling it "a roller coaster of melody that stops short and leaves you hanging, hungry for more."

== Personnel ==
The Misfits

- Glenn Danzig – vocals
- Jerry Only – bass
- Franché Coma – guitar
- Mr. Jim – drums

Production

- Dave Achelis – engineer
- Tom Bejgrowicz – producer

== Cover versions ==
"Hybrid Moments" has been covered by such artists as Blink-182, Green Day, Mac DeMarco, and No Use for a Name.

== In popular culture ==
The song has been featured in films, television series, and video games, including the first episode of the first season of the television series Castle Rock, the 2018 film Mid90s, and the 2019 video game WWE 2K20.

== Certifications ==
Region	Certification	Certified units/sales
United States (RIAA)	Gold	500,000^{‡}
^{‡} Sales+streaming figures based on certification alone.

== Bibliography ==
- Greene, James Jr. (2013). This Music Leaves Stains: The Complete Story of the Misfits. Scarecrow Press. ISBN 978-1589798922.
