= He loves me... he loves me not =

Game

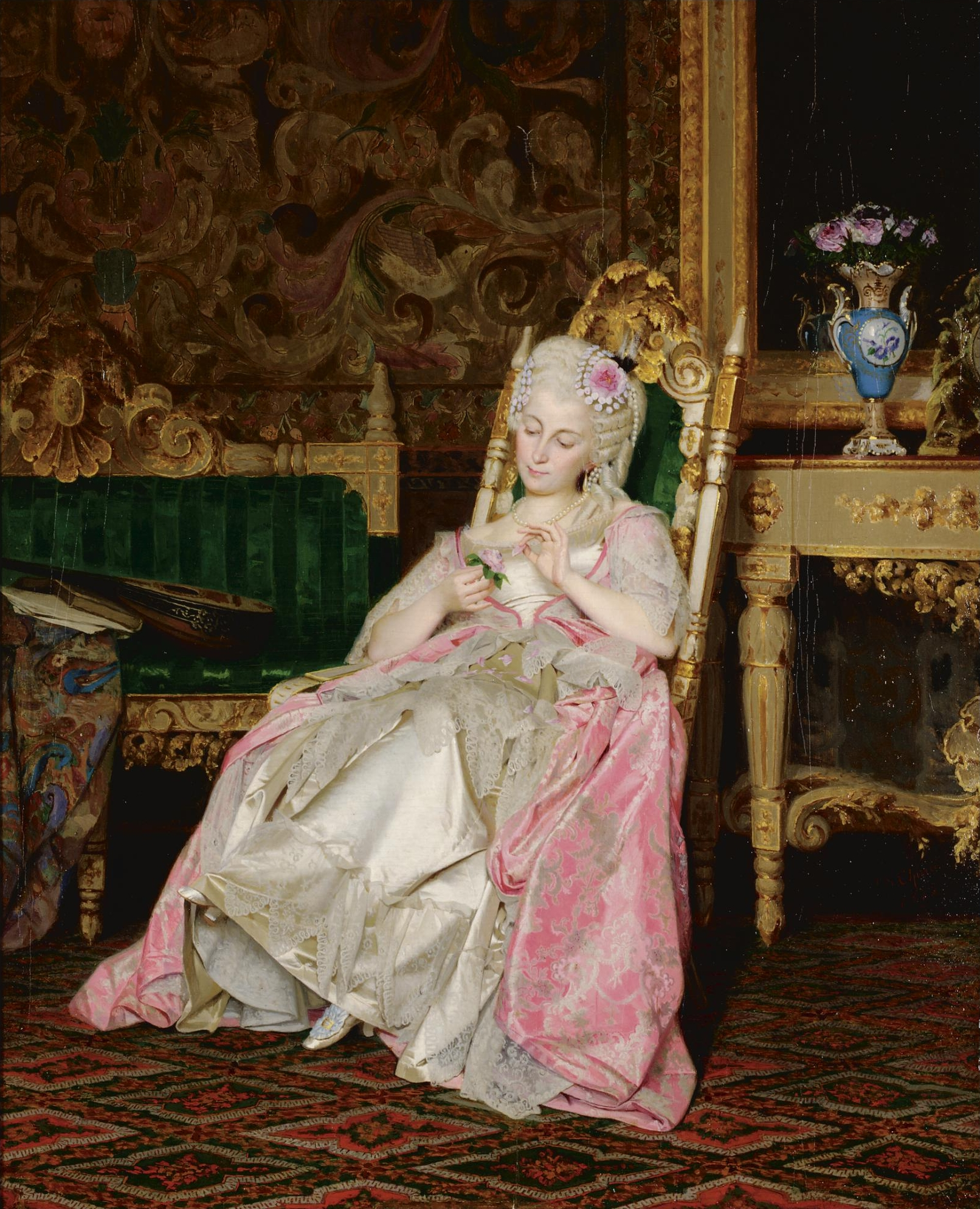
He Loves Me, He Loves Me Not. Giacomo Di Chirico, 1872

He loves me, he loves me not or She loves me, she loves me not (originally effeuiller la marguerite in French) is a game of French origin, in which one person seeks to determine whether the object of their affection returns that affection.

== Game ==
A person playing the game alternately speaks the phrases "He (or she) loves me," and "He loves me not," while picking one petal off a flower (usually an ox-eye daisy) for each phrase. The phrase they speak on picking off the last petal supposedly represents the truth between the object of their affection loving them or not. The player is typically motivated by attraction to the person they are speaking of while reciting the phrases. They may seek to reaffirm a pre-existing belief or act out of whimsy.

In the original French version of the game, the petals do not simply indicate whether the object of the player's affection loves them, but to what extent: un peu or "a little", beaucoup or "a lot", passionnément or "passionately", à la folie or "to madness", or pas du tout or "not at all."

A humorous twist on the game is "He loves me, he loves me lots."

== In popular culture ==
In Part 1 of Goethe's Faust, Gretchen engages in the game. (1808)

This fortune-telling is shown as a pantomime in the 1st act of Giselle, ballet by Jean Coralli and Jules Perrot (Paris, 1841).

In Part 6 of Anna Karenina, Kitty and Levin play this game (regarding whether another character will propose that day). (1877)

In "How Will I Know", American singer Whitney Houston speaks the phrases of this game. (1985)

In ”Shrek“ Fiona plays This Game in regards of Shrek. (2001)

In "Loves Me Not" by Russian Pop Duo t.A.T.u the game is referenced with a bisexual twist, including both "He Loves Me (not)" and "She Loves Me (not)" to describe a complicated relationship. (2005)

American singer Taylor Swift also references this game in the lyrics of her songs "You're On Your Own, Kid" (2022) and "Wood." (2025)

American singer Ravyn Lenae also references this game in her song "Love Me Not," which peaked at number 5 on Billboard Hot 100. (2024)

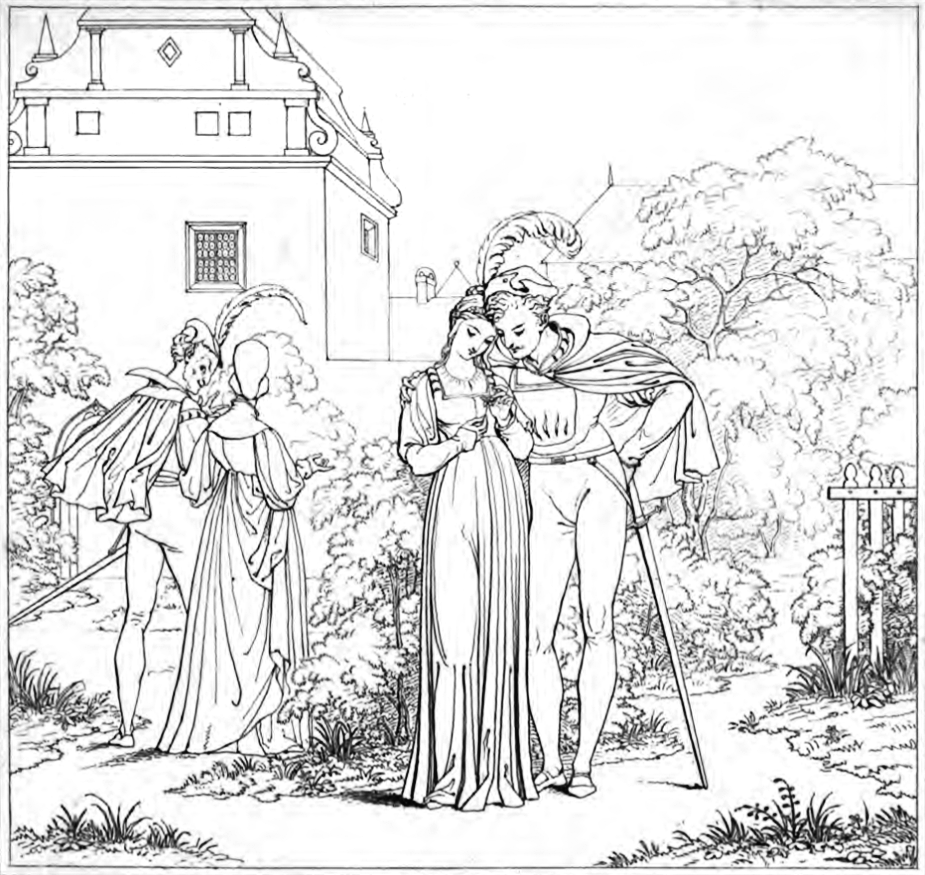
The Decision of the Flower (1820)

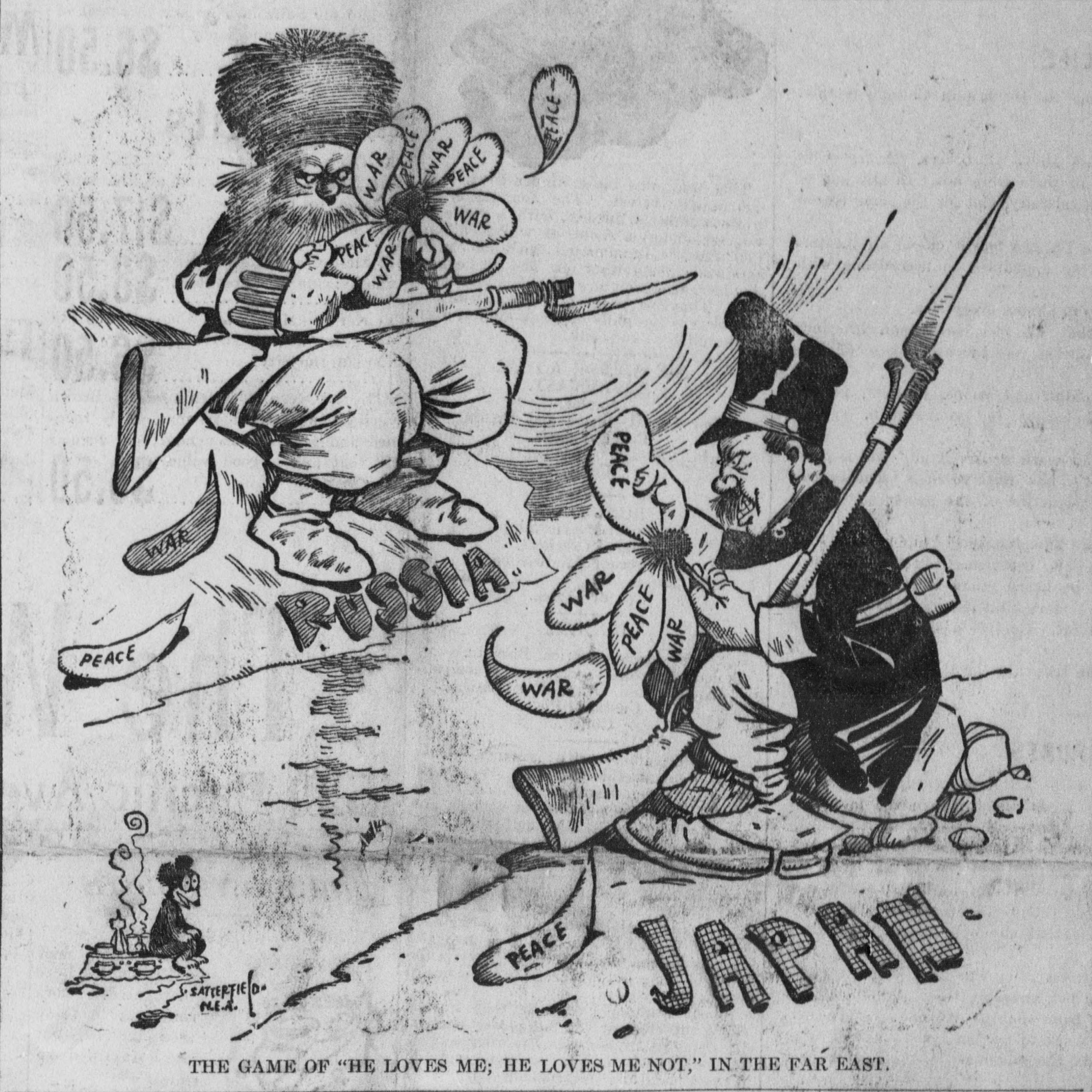
This 1904 cartoon by Bob Satterfield depicts the Russian Empire and the Empire of Japan using the game to decide whether to go to war with each other.
