= Ruby Records =

American record label

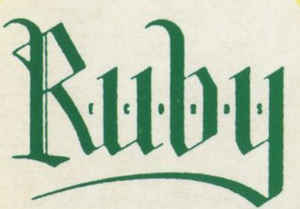
- Parent company: Slash Records
- Founded: 1981; 45 years ago
- Founder: Chris D.
- Distributors: Warner Bros. Records (In the US); Mercury Records (Outside the US)
- Genre: Various
- Country of origin: United States

Ruby Records is an American record label, founded predominantly as a rock music label subsidiary of Slash Records. The original version of the label released seven albums in 1981 and 1982.

Ruby was distributed through the same independent distributors that handled its corporate parent, Slash. When Warner Bros. Records bought Slash, they took over distribution of Ruby's three most popular albums (The Gun Club's Fire of Love, The Misfits' Walk Among Us, The Dream Syndicate's The Days of Wine and Roses) and deleted the others (which included releases by the Flesh Eaters, Blurt and Lydia Lunch). The WB-distributed version of Fire of Love has an altered cover design, but the CD reissues on Slash and Rhino use the original artwork. Ruby was founded by the Flesh Eaters singer Chris D. He was listed as producer of the Misfits' Walk Among Us LP on its original release, although this was amended for the CD reissue. Chris D. also produced The Dream Syndicate's The Days of Wine and Roses and some tracks on The Gun Club's Fire of Love, as well as the two Flesh Eaters albums released by Ruby.

After the Chris D. era, the Ruby label received some brief revivals. In 1989, it released albums by Sweet Baby and Field Trip. In 2012, Drag News released a self-titled EP on Ruby. In 2018, Prayers collaborated with the surviving members of Christian Death to release a limited-edition single on Ruby. Ruby has also released an album by Mississippi Fred McDowell and an EP by The Drab.

== See also ==
- List of record labels
