= Legacy of Brutality =

Compilation album by the Misfits
- Released: September 1985
- Recorded: January–February 1978, August 1980, June 1981, 1985
- Studio: Reel Platinum
- Genre: Horror punk; punk rock
- Length: 24:47
- Label: Plan 9
- Producer: Glenn Danzig

The Misfits chronology
Earth A.D./Wolfs Blood (1983)	Legacy of Brutality (1985)	Misfits (1986)

Professional ratings
Review scores
Source	Rating
AllMusic	4/5 stars
Spin Alternative Record Guide	8/10

Legacy of Brutality is a compilation album of early songs by the American punk rock band Misfits, released in September 1985. It contains overdubbed mixes of previously unreleased songs, mainly from the January–February 1978 Static Age sessions. Besides The Misfits box set, this is the only official album containing the songs "Who Killed Marilyn?" and "American Nightmare".

This compilation was the first (aside from bootlegs) to release many of the then-unreleased Static Age songs to the public. Glenn Danzig, the songwriter, mixed and produced it, overdubbing new instrumentation.

== Track listing ==
All tracks are written by Glenn Danzig

No.	Title	Length
1.	"Static Age"	1:47
2.	"TV Casualty"	2:34
3.	"Hybrid Moments"	1:39
4.	"Spinal Remains"	1:24
5.	"Come Back"	5:00
6.	"Some Kinda Hate"	2:08
7.	"Theme for a Jackal"	2:37
8.	"Angelfuck"	1:34
9.	"Who Killed Marilyn?"	1:56
10.	"Where Eagles Dare"	1:58
11.	"She"	1:22
12.	"Halloween"	1:46
13.	"American Nightmare"	1:42

== Credits ==
- Glenn Danzig – vocals, guitar and bass on tracks 9, 10, and 13, piano on track 7, overdubbed guitar and bass on tracks 1–8, and 11, clapping on track 13
- Franché Coma – original guitar for tracks 1–8, and 11
- Bobby Steele – original guitar for tracks 9, 10 and 12
- Doyle Wolfgang von Frankenstein – original guitar on track 12, clapping on track 13
- Jerry Only – bass, clapping on track 13
- Mr. Jim – drums on tracks 1–8, and 11
- Joey Image – drums on tracks 9 and 10
- Arthur Googy – drums on tracks 12 and 13
- Rocky Caiafa – clapping on track 13
- Bob Allecca – mixing engineer
