= Andrew Gormley =

American drummer

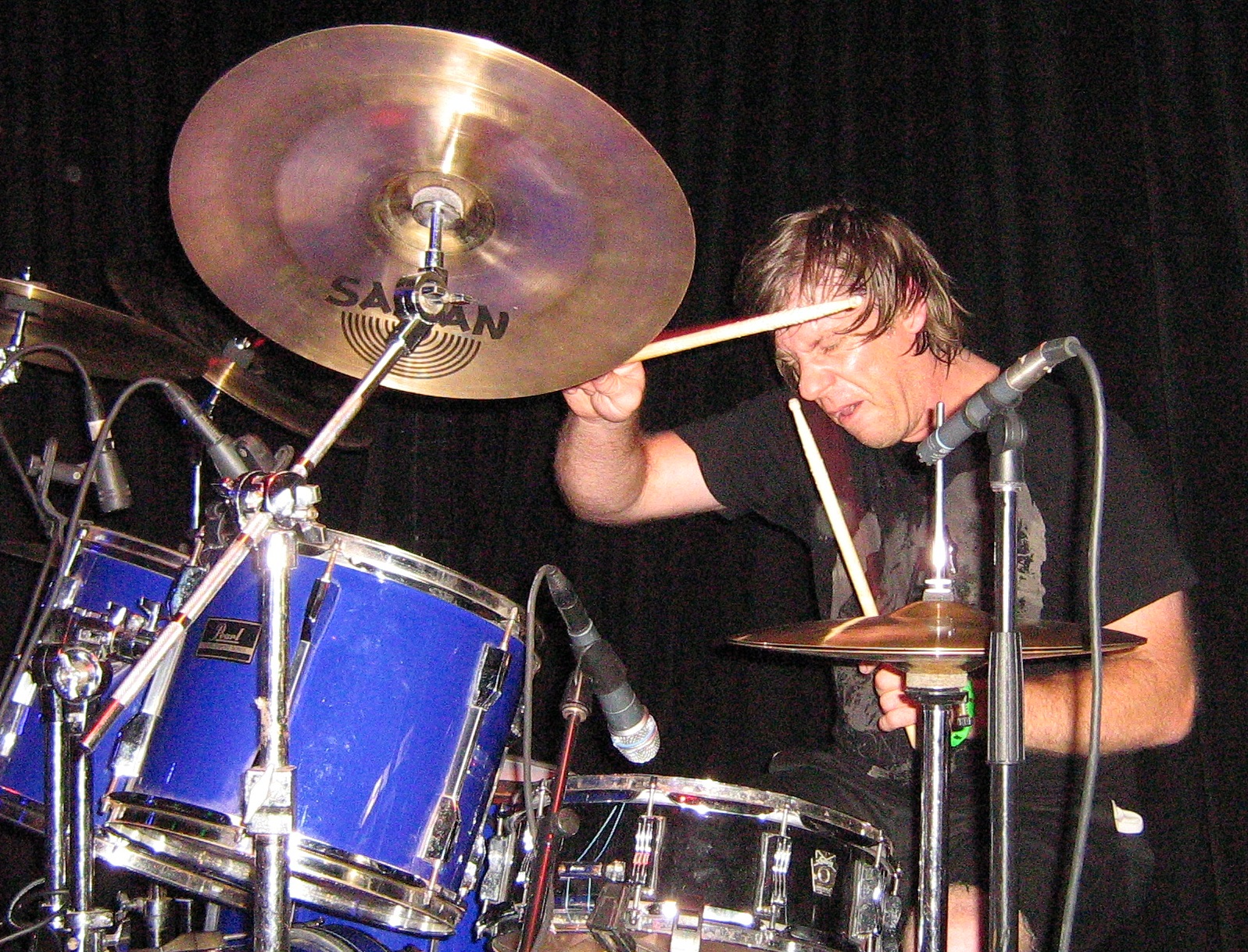

Background information
- Origin: New Jersey, United States
- Genres: Powerviolence; hardcore punk; metalcore

Andrew Gormley is an American drummer from New Jersey. He has played with multiple bands, including metalcore band Shai Hulud and Rorschach, a hardcore band from New Jersey.

== Bands ==
- Torment (thrash metal) - drums (1988)
- Under Control (hardcore punk) - drums (1988)
- Rorschach (band) (hardcore punk) - drums (1989–1993, reunion 2009)
- Die 116 (post hardcore) - drums (1993–1995)
- Kiss it Goodbye (hardcore metal) - drums (1995–1998)
- Today is the Day (metal) - drums (fill in, two shows 1998)
- Shai Hulud - drums (1998, 2004–2007)
- Playing Enemy (prog metal hardcore) - drums (1999–2007)
- Spacebag (math/grind) Drums 2011–Present
