= Troublemakers (Swedish band) =

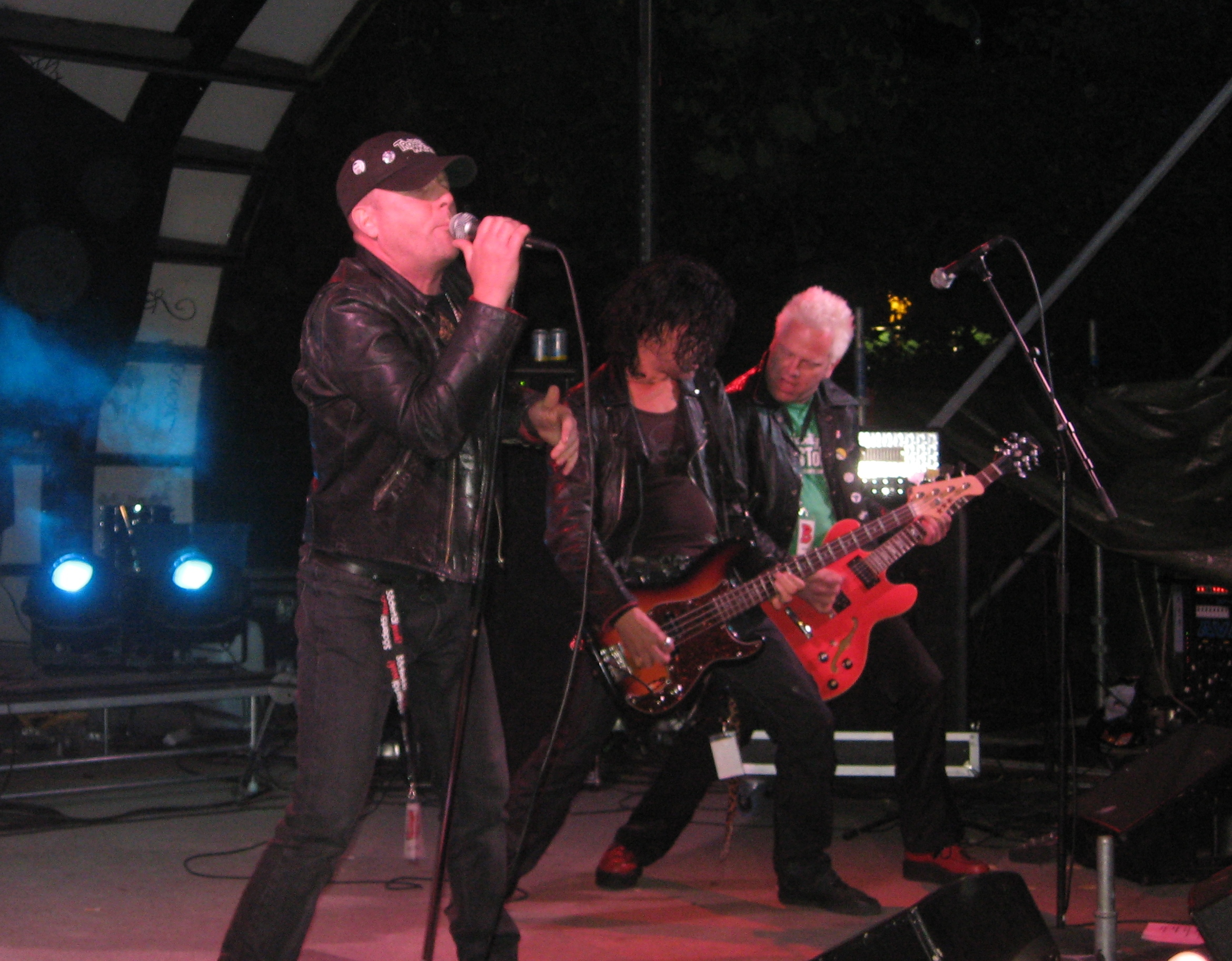
- Troublemakers playing at Pretzeltown 2009

Background information
- Origin: Gothenburg, Sweden
- Genre: Punk rock
- Years active: 1981–present
- Website: www.troublemakers.se

Troublemakers are a Swedish punk band originally formed in Gothenburg in 1981 with members from Perverts (they often play "Ronka" by Perverts live) and Göteborg Sound. The band split up in 1991, but reformed in 1995. The band has been described as "kukrock" and compared with a runaway express train.

Members are (or have been) are Christer Blomgren (vocals), Arild “Psychobilly” Hanssen (guitar), Christian “Elvis” Odin (bass), Charlie Claeson (drums), Martin Hansson (drums), Jens Petersson (bass), Lars-Olof “LOB” Bengtsson (guitar), Dennis Johansson (bass), Jan Olof “Esso” Olsson (drums) and Anders Puke (bass).

In 2010, Troublemakers won first prize in the punk/hardcore category at Manifest for their album Made in Sweden.
