= Arthur Googy =

American drummer

Arthur Googy is an American musician known for being the drummer of horror punk band The Misfits from 1980 to 1982. Originally from Jackson Heights, New York, he attended Blessed Sacrament elementary school followed by a brisk visit to Newtown High.

Googy was the longest-running drummer of the band's original era, spanning the years 1980–1982, and was present during the "Master Sound Productions Sessions" that led to the Walk Among Us album. He would tour with the band in several infamous shows, many of which ended up on highly sought-after bootlegs. His contributions include the albums Walk Among Us, Evilive and 3 Hits from Hell. His work is also prevalent in Collection I and Collection II, as well as the drummer for tracks 9, 12 and 13 on the album Legacy of Brutality. "Die, Die My Darling" from the Die, Die My Darling EP is also attributed to him.

Jerry Only states in the book "American Hardcore" that he attributed a significant amount of success for the album Walk Among Us due to Arthur's dedication to the music and rehearsals. Only goes on to reveal that Arthur worked a full-time job in construction in NYC, lived in Queens and traveled daily to New Jersey.

Googy also drummed for New York hardcore band Antidote after leaving the Misfits, playing on their debut EP, Thou Shalt Not Kill. Credited as Bliss, he got the name because they used to take the 7 train into Times Square from Queens, and there’s a stop called 46th and Bliss St. so he said, “46th and Bliss, that’s what I am....Bliss.”.

== Discography ==
=== With The Misfits ===
- 3 Hits from Hell (1981) - 7-inch EP
- Halloween (1981) - 7-inch single
- Walk Among Us (1982) - LP
- Evilive (1982)
- Die, Die My Darling (1984) - 7-inch single
- Legacy of Brutality (Tracks 9, 12 and 13) (1985)
- Collection I (1986)
- Collection II (1995)
- 12 Hits From Hell (2001) – LP

=== With Antidote ===
- Thou Shalt Not Kill (1983) - 7-inch EP
- The A7 And Beyond (1984)
