= All Nite Grind =

EP by Mr. Envi'
- Released: March 31, 2017
- Recorded: 2016
- Genre: Hip hop
- Length: 27:18
- Label: Southern Stisles Records
- Producer: MistaTBeatz, David Lee, JTL

Mr. Envi' chronology
Evryday Hustle (2016)	All Nite Grind (2017)	Tha 40oz (2018)

All Nite Grind is the third EP by American rapper Mr. Envi'. The EP was released on March 31, 2017, by his record label Southern Stisles Records. The EP features guest appearances from Young Bleed, Chucky Workclothes, Syke Pachino and more.

== Background ==
On January 5, 2017, Mr. Envi' announced the release of the second installment of his two part EP series. The EP was supported by the singles "3 Stripes" and "Can't See Me". In an interview with Illuminati 2G, Mr. Envi' stated that he'd release music videos for both singles, with the "3 Stripes" video releasing in February 2017 and "Can't See Me" in mid March.

== Track listing ==
No.	Title	Producer(s)	Length
1.	"Intro"	MistaTBeatz	1:50
2.	"What You Seein'" (featuring MJ Blade)	MistaTBeatz	3:40
3.	"3 Stripes" (featuring Chucky Workclothes)	David Lee	3:25
4.	"Deceptions" (featuring Torrance Brossette, Madamm Meek and Young Bleed)	MistaTBeatz	4:12
5.	"All for tha Bread" (featuring Torrance Brossette)	MistaTBeatz	2:40
6.	"Mind'n My Bidness'" (featuring Young Bleed, Chucky Workclothes and Omega)	MistaTBeatz	3:52
7.	"Can't See Me" (featuring Syke Pachino and Chucky Workclothes)	JTL	3:50
8.	"Why They Mad" (featuring Torrance Brossette)	MistaTBeatz	3:49
