= Professor Works Laboratory Vol. 2 =

Mixtape by Chucky Workclothes
- Released: August 26, 2016
- Recorded: 2016
- Genre: Hip hop
- Length: 28:30
- Label: Team Insomniac
- Producer: Syke Pachino, David Lee, Dope Boi Beatz, Playbwoi Tha Great, Enocc

Chucky Workclothes chronology
Professor Works Laboratory Vol. 1 (2015)	Professor Works Laboratory Vol. 2 (2016)	Professor Works Laboratory Vol. 3 (2017)

Professor Works Laboratory Vol. 2 is a retail Mixtape by American rapper Chucky Workclothes. It was released by his label Team Insomniac on August 26, 2016.

== Background ==
Professor Works Laboratory Vol. 2 is the second installment of the Professor Works Laboratory series. The mixtape includes guest features from Young Bleed, Mr. Envi', Syke Pachino, Tha Homie Jai, Omega, Enocc, Keylo G and S.O.M Boss Hog. The EP was supported by the singles "Believe It" and "What We Do".

Professional ratings
Review scores
Source	Rating
Skope Magazine	(positive)

== Track listing ==
No.	Title	Producer(s)	Length
1.	"Clocks Tickin (feat. Omega)"	Syke Pachino	3:03
2.	"Believe It (feat. Tha Homie Jai & Playbwoi Tha Great)"	Playbwoi Tha Great	3:01
3.	"Never Coming Down (feat. Young Bleed, Mr. Envi' & S.O.M Boss Hog)"	David Lee	5:13
4.	"Keep Mobbin (feat. Mr. Envi' & Young Bleed)"	Syke Pachino	3:36
5.	"Kush Habit (feat. Enocc & Keylo G)"	Enocc	4:12
6.	"What We Do (feat. Syke Pachino)"	Syke Pachino	3:43
7.	"Where We Goin (feat. Mr. Envi')"	Dope Boi Beatz	2:51
8.	"Paper Stalker (feat. Grimy)"	Syke Pachino	2:54
