= Evryday Hustle =

EP by Mr. Envi'
- Released: May 27, 2016
- Recorded: 2015–16
- Genre: Hip hop
- Length: 26:38
- Label: Southern Stisles Records
- Producer: MistaTBeatz, Dope Boi Beatz, Like O Productions

Mr. Envi' chronology
Damage Kontrol (2015)	Evryday Hustle (2016)	All Nite Grind (2017)

Evryday Hustle is the second EP by American rapper Mr. Envi'. The EP was released on May 27, 2016 by his record label Southern Stisles Records.

== Background ==
On January 23, 2016 Mr. Envi' announced he would release a two part EP series in 2016. "Evryday Hustle" would serve as the first of the two releases and the second, entitled "All Nite Grind", was scheduled to be released later in the year, around September 2016. On April 8, 2016 he released the single "Where We Goin'" featuring Chucky Workclothes, shortly after the official track list was announced.

Professional ratings
Review scores
Source	Rating
Sputnikmusic	3.5/5 stars
Skope Magazine	(positive)

== Track listing ==
No.	Title	Producer(s)	Length
1.	"Intro"	MistaTBeatz	3:03
2.	"Where We Goin' feat. Chucky Workclothes"	Dope Boi Beatz	2:53
3.	"Bad Dream"	MistaTBeatz	4:08
4.	"A Lot On My Mind"	Dope Boi Beatz	4:42
5.	"Gold Diggaz feat. JTL"	MistaTBeatz	3:46
6.	"Evryday Hustle feat. Chucky Workclothes & Syke Pachino"	MistaTBeatz	4:35
7.	"Like Pro's feat. Mr. Hympdok"	Like O Productions	3:32
