= Gorgeous Frankenstein =

American horror punk/metal band

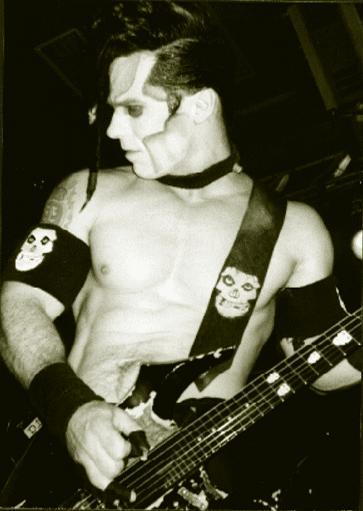
- Founder and guitarist Doyle Wolfgang von Frankenstein

Background information
- Origin: New Jersey, U.S.
- Genres: Horror punk, heavy metal
- Years active: 2005–2012
- Labels: Evilive Records
- Spinoffs: Doyle
- Past members: Doyle Wolfgang von Frankenstein; Gorgeous George Frankenstein; Landon Blood; Dr. Chud "Left Hand" Graham; Jesco Deviliance; Argyle Goolsby; Alex Story

Gorgeous Frankenstein was an American horror punk/heavy metal band formed in 2005 in New Jersey by Doyle Wolfgang von Frankenstein and his former wife and ex-professional wrestler Stephanie Bellars (a.k.a. Gorgeous George). The band's name is a combination of both Doyle and Bellars' stage names.

== History ==
In 2005, Doyle left New Jersey for Las Vegas and began auditioning members for his new band, Gorgeous Frankenstein. The same year, he appeared on stage with Danzig numerous times throughout their tour and lead vocalist Glenn Danzig offered to produce Gorgeous Frankenstein first eponymous album on his record Label Evilive.

In 2006, Doyle and Danzig had recruited bassist Argyle Goolsby (lead vocalist of Blitzkid) and hired British comic book artist Simon Bisley to do the cover artwork for the band's debut album. The musical arrangements of the band's debut album were completed before July 2007. Vocalist Landon Blood and ex-Blitzkid drummer Jesco Devilanse (Andrew "Stipes" Winter) were eventually recruited for the recording of the album. The band's self-titled debut album was released in 2007.

Later in 2007, Gorgeous Frankenstein embarked on their first tour, opening for Danzig. The band's lineup included vocalist and bassist Argyle Goolsby and ex-Misfits drummer Dr. Chud. Stephanie Bellars (Gorgeous George) took part in these shows as a dancer. Following auditions for a singer, Doyle recruited Cancerslug's frontman Alex Story.

In 2012, following Story's suggestion to start a new band with a more recognizable name, guitarist Doyle decided to abandon Gorgeous Frankenstein and formed the band Doyle with the former's line-up. The following year, Doyle released their debut album, Abominator.

== Members ==
Final lineup

- Doyle Wolfgang von Frankenstein – guitar (2005–2012) (ex-Misfits, ex-Kryst the Conqueror)
- "Left Hand" Graham – bass (2008–2012) (ex-Graves, ex-Doyle)
- Dr. Chud – drums (2008–2012) (ex-Kryst the Conqueror, Dr. Chud's X-Ward, ex-Graves, Dan Kidney and the Pulsations, ex-Misfits, ex-Sacred Trash, ex-Sardonica, ex-The Lost Boys)
- Alex Story – vocals (2009–2012) (Cancerslug, Doyle)
- Gorgeous George (Stephanie Bellars) – dancer

Previous members

- Argyle Goolsby – bass, vocals (2007)
- Landon Blood – vocals (2007)
- Jesco Devilsanse – drums (2007) (ex-Blitzkid)
- Michale Graves – vocals (guest)

== Discography ==
=== Studio albums ===
- Gorgeous Frankenstein (2007)
