= Deliver Us from Evil =

"Deliver us from evil" is a line from the Lord's Prayer in the Bible.

Deliver Us from Evil may also refer to:

== Books ==
- Deliver Us from Evil (novel), a novel by David Baldacci
- Deliver Us from Evil: Defeating Terrorism, Despotism, and Liberalism, a 2004 book by Sean Hannity
- Deliver Us from Evil: The Story of Vietnam's Flight to Freedom, a 1956 book by US Navy physician and humanitarian Thomas Anthony Dooley III
- Deliver Us from Evil: Warlords and Peacekeepers in a World of Endless Conflict, a 2000 book by William Shawcross
- Deliver Us from Evil: The Story of a Man Who Dared to Explore the Censored Fourth of Christ's Ministry, a 1972 book by Don Basham

== Films ==
- Deliver Us from Evil (1969 film), a Canadian drama film
- Deliver Us from Evil (1973 film), an American television crime drama film
- Deliver Us From Evil (1976 film), an American drama film
- Prom Night IV: Deliver Us from Evil, a 1991 Canadian horror film
- Deliver Us from Evil (2006 film), an American documentary film about pedophile priest Oliver O'Grady
- Deliver Us from Evil (2009 film), a Danish thriller film by Danish director Ole Bornedal
- Deliver Us from Evil (2014 film), an American supernatural horror film by Scott Derrickson
- Deliver Us from Evil (2020 film), a South Korean action film

== Television ==
- "Deliver Us From Evil" (Fireside Theatre), a 1951 episode
- "Deliver Us From Evil" (Miami Vice), a 1988 episode
- "Deliver Us from Evil" (Quantum Leap), a 1992 episode
- "Deliver Us from Evil" (McLeod's Daughters), a 2006 episode
- "Deliver Us From Evil" (A Haunting), a 2022 episode
- "Deliver Us from Evil" (Law & Order: Organized Crime), a 2024 episode

== Music ==
- Deliver Us from Evil (Budgie album), a 1982 album by Budgie
- Deliver Us from Evil (Kryst the Conqueror album), a 1990 EP and an unreleased album by Kryst the Conqueror
