= Damage Kontrol =

Studio album by Mr. Envi'
- Released: August 14, 2015
- Recorded: 2015
- Genre: Southern hip hop
- Length: 29:00
- Label: Mia Mind Music/Southern Stisles Records, Select-O-Hits
- Producer: Hyphy, MistaTBeatz, JTL, Camille Blouin

Mr. Envi' chronology
| The Recap (2014) | Damage Kontrol (2015) | Evryday Hustle (2016) |

Damage Kontrol is the third independent album by hip-hop artist Mr. Envi'. It was released on August 14, 2015 under Mia Mind Music/Southern Stisles Records and was distributed by Select-O-Hits. The album managed to reach the CMJ Hip Hop Top 40 National Airplay Chart, debuting at #40 its first week and moving up to #38 the second.

Professional ratings
Review scores
| Source | Rating |
|---|---|
| Sputnikmusic | 4/5 stars |

== Track listing ==
| No. | Title | Producer(s) | Length |
|---|---|---|---|
| 1. | "Got No Time" | Hyphy | 2:39 |
| 2. | "Tha Wrong Thangz" | MistaTBeatz | 2:06 |
| 3. | "Keep It Real" | Hyphy | 3:04 |
| 4. | "Like Me" (featuring Young Bleed) | MistaTBeatz | 3:17 |
| 5. | "Skit I" (UnMasked) | | :57 |
| 6. | "Rubber Checkz" (featuring La Chat) | Hyphy | 3:21 |
| 7. | "Somebody Lied" (featuring Lady Cam) | Camille Blouin | 2:59 |
| 8. | "Gettin' Money" | MistaTBeatz | 3:57 |
| 9. | "Tha Underdog" (featuring JTL) | JTL | 4:08 |
| 10. | "Skit II" (UnMasked) | MistaTBeatz | 2:32 |
