= Get It Got It =

Studio album by Lady Cam
- Released: May 20, 2014
- Recorded: 2013
- Genre: Southern hip hop
- Length: 39:09
- Label: Southern Stisles Records, Altavoz Entertainment
- Producer: Lady Cam

Lady Cam chronology
Cam Effect: Reloaded (2011)	Get It Got It (2014)	Crosslines (2016)

Get It Got It is the second independent album by the rapper Lady Cam. It was released on May 20, 2014, by Southern Stisles Records and Altavoz Entertainment. The album was supported by the single "Get It Got It" and received positive reviews.

== Track listing ==
1. Get It Started (The Party) – 3:36
2. Holla – 4:19
3. Get It Got It – 3:13
4. Pocket Book – 3:30
5. Queen Of A Queen – 3:49
6. They Hate It – 4:00
7. Never Give Up – 4:42
8. Crush – 3:18
9. On The Fly – 3:03
10. My Story – 5:39
