= Professor Works Laboratory Vol. 1 =

EP by Chucky Workclothes
- Released: December 28, 2015
- Recorded: 2015
- Genre: Hip hop
- Length: 26:06
- Label: Team Insomniac
- Producer: Syke Pachino, DJ Choice & Brad Beats, Yankes Pro, Flash Gordon, Sean Beatz

Chucky Workclothes chronology
Tax Season (2015)	Professor Works Laboratory Vol. 1 (2015)	Professor Works Laboratory Vol. 2 (2016)

Professor Works Laboratory Vol. 1 is an eight track EP by American rapper Chucky Workclothes. It was released by his label Team Insomniac on December 28, 2015. The EP is part of a three part series, with the second part released on August 26, 2016, and the third part released in 2017. The EP was supported by the singles "Sir Charles" and "Team Insomniac".

== Track listing ==
No.	Title	Producer(s)	Length
1.	"Team Insomniac (Intro)"	Syke Pachino	3:34
2.	"Work, Grind, Eat, Rest (feat. Joey Souf)"	DJ Choice & Brad Beats	2:57
3.	"Sir Charles"	Syke Pachino	3:17
4.	"Nothing for Free (feat. Lake Lee)"	Syke Pachino	3:17
5.	"So Easy"	Sean Beatz	3:23
6.	"One for the Money (feat. Lake Lee)"	Yankes Pro	2:16
7.	"I Ain't Got a Job (feat. Big Jay)"	Flash Gordon	3:52
8.	"You Can Have It (feat. Lacey Dee)"	Yankes Pro	3:36
