= Altavoz =

American music distributor

Altavoz, Inc.
- Company type: Private
- Industry: Entertainment, Wholesale
- Founded: 1994; 32 years ago
- Founder: Nelson Jacobsen
- Headquarters: Rockville, Maryland
- Area served: U.S.: Southeast and nationwide
- Services: Digital, Physical, Global Distribution
- Website: altavoz.com

Altavoz, Inc. (Spanish: Loudspeaker) is an American music distributor founded in 1994 which serves independent entertainers, covering a variety of musical genres. A year after the company was founded, it was purchased by investor Nelson Jacobsen and relaunched in Rockville, Maryland.

== History ==
Nelson Jacobsen established Altavoz.com after its acquisition. The website offered downloads of digital sound files (.wav) and fifteen-second introductions to music streams.

By 1999, Altavoz had rolled out merchandise in big box stores such Best Buy and independent retailers nationwide. Their offerings expanded to vinyl records, books and more. By the time of the dot-com crash, Altavoz continued to provide stock to thousands of independent and big box stores and was receiving 1.2 million hits a day on the official website.

In 2011, Jacobsen took a new leadership role in the company as its CEO. In 2013, Altavoz began online presentations for distribution deals exporting US-made music. Part of the incorporation of the company included the non-profit "Help Earth Foundation." On September 25, 2015, Max Media Group, Inc. (MXMI) announced that its board of directors had voted unanimously to transfer a majority of the control of MXMI to Altavoz Entertainment.

As of late 2017, Jacobsen, a board member of MXMI, continues to lead Altavoz as CEO.

== Major project ==
In collaboration with David Lynch, Altavoz released a limited-edition vinyl box set to benefit the David Lynch Foundation on Record Store Day in 2012. The compilation, Music That Changes the World, features 34 songs from Alanis Morissette, Tom Waits, Amanda Palmer, Ben Folds, Iggy Pop, Maroon 5, Neon Trees and more. The four LP box set also includes a 42-page custom-made color book by "Imprint Indie Printing" of N. Venice, Florida. The book, introduced by David Lynch, was illustrated by Nepali artist Romio Shrestha and New Jersey artist Davel Hamue. All songs were re-mastered for this project by Gavin Lurssen.

== Exclusive library release (2015) ==
"Songs of Phillip Carter" was released exclusively to an estimated 120,000 Public Libraries in the USA before being made available to digital and physical outlets. Phillip Carter was the first gospel artist with an exclusive music release to the US Public Library system.

== Artists ==
- Argonauts
- Big Mucci
- Dawn Richard
- Doyle Wolfgang Von Frankenstein
- Emily
- Julie Doiron
- Lady Cam
- Phillip Carter
- Roy "Future man" Wooten
- Sunwolf
- Theo Sampel
- Tom
- VALIS

== Former artists ==
- Jack Mack and the Heart Attack
- K Mitch
- Love Dominique

== Releases ==
- Theo Sampel – Sampel This (2006)
- Revival – Horses of War (2007)
- Dawn Richard – Golden Heart (2013)
- Bella Nae – H.I.G.H. XOXO (2013)
- Quinn Sullivan – Getting There (2013)
- Various Artist – Drop the Needle: Boston Punk Anthology (2013)
- VALIS – Minds through Space and Time (2013)
- Doyle Wolfgang von Frankenstein – Abominator (2013)
- Julie Doiron – So Many Days (2013)
- Argonauts – Whats Your Perfect Day (2013)
- Jack Mack And the Heart Attack* – Lookin’ Up (2013)
- Love Dominique* – Love Dominique (2014)
- Big Mucci – Shuffle, Step, Slide (2014)
- Lady Cam – Get It Got It (2014)
- Sunwolf – Angel Eyes (2014)
- Phillip Carter – Songs of Phillip Carter (Exclusive Library Release) ELR
- John Bull and The Bandits – Words to the Wise (2015)
- K. Mitch* – WDGAF (single)

* Not currently signed.

== Billboard chart history ==
2013:

Dawn Richard CD Goldenheart January 2013 after leaving Diddy Dirty Money and Danity Kane

Chart (2013)	Peak position
UK Independent Albums Breakers	16
US Billboard 200	137
US Independent Albums	21
US Top Heatseekers Albums	2
US Top R&B/Hip-Hop Albums	22

Quinn Sullivan – CD Getting There Released May 2013 reached #4 on Billboard Blues Chart. Aug, 24th 2013

2015:

John Bull and the Bandits, Single "Mr. Bradley" April 9, 2015 #73 Billboard Blues Cart.
