= Tax Season (album) =

Studio album by Chucky Workclothes
- Released: February 24, 2015
- Recorded: 2014
- Genre: Hip hop
- Length: 1:02:09
- Label: RBC Records E1
- Producer: Daz Dillinger, Whitehead, Big O, Dr. XXXclusive, Playbwoi the Great

Chucky Workclothes chronology
Country Boy Livin' (2014)	Tax Season (2015)	Professor Works Laboratory Vol. 1 (2015)

Tax Season is the debut solo album by American rapper Chucky Workclothes. It was originally released on February 24, 2015, by RBC Records, then later released on August 24, 2015, under his own brand. The album features guest appearances from Crooked I, Pusha T, Kurupt, E-40, Young Buck, Young Bleed and more. The album was supported by the singles "Tax Season" featuring Crooked I, "State To State" featuring E-40 and "Nothing Moves" featuring Kurupt.

== Track listings ==
No.	Title	Length
1.	"Pick Em Up Nelson (Intro)"	0:31
2.	"Tax Season" (feat. Crooked I)	4:00
3.	"You Know the Name"	3:32
4.	"I Don't Know Her" (feat. Joey Souf)	2:55
5.	"52 Bars" (feat. Lake Lee)	3:17
6.	"V.I.P" (feat. Pusha T & Da Bwoi Fane)	3:46
7.	"Livin Outta My Luggage" (feat. Nathan Arizona)	3:52
8.	"The Avenue" (feat. Joey Souf & Spacedad)	4:33
9.	"Is It a Crime" (feat. Grimy)	4:35
10.	"Nothing Moves" (feat. Kurupt)	4:10
11.	"Pick Em Up Nelson (Skit)"	0:25
12.	"On the Way to the Top" (feat. Philthy Phil)	4:29
13.	"State To State" (feat. E-40 & Bigg Dutta)	4:03
14.	"Give It Up" (feat. Ko)	2:47
15.	"Waiting On You" (feat. Young Buck & Buggie)	3:50
16.	"Loud Pack" (feat. Spacedad & Playbwoi the Great)	3:49
17.	"Candy Wrappers"	3:57
18.	"Gotta Get Away" (feat. Young Bleed & Ko)	2:59
19.	"Much Love (Outro)"	0:54
