= Summation (disambiguation) =

Summation is a mathematical operation.

Summation may also refer to:

- Addition
- Summation (neurophysiology), a way of achieving action potential in a neuron
- In law, a closing argument

== See also ==
- Sum (disambiguation)
- Summary (disambiguation)
