= My Own =

My Own may refer to:

- My Own (TV series), an American dating reality television series
- My Own (album), a 1999 album by Young Bleed
