= Livin' (album) =

Studio album by Young Bleed
- Released: February 10, 2017
- Recorded: 2015–16
- Genre: Hip hop
- Length: 65:53
- Label: Trap Door Entertainment/Team Mashn' Entertainment
- Producer: Keno, Mo B. Dick, Zilla, T. Fleming, Captainhook, West Coast Stone, Shawn Lambert, Enocc, Don Bishop, College Boy

Young Bleed chronology
| Country Boy Livin' (2014) | Livin' (2017) |

Livin is the seventh studio album by southern hip hop artist Young Bleed. It was released by his label Trap Door Entertainment on February 10, 2017. The album is his first solo release since his departure from Strange Music in 2011.

== Background ==
Originally scheduled to be released on January 20, 2017, it was decided to release Livin' at a later date, with the intent to extend the promotional efforts for the release. By doing so, Young Bleed was able to release a third single, "B' Dare", in addition to the singles "Livin' Good" and "On My Walter Payton" to support the release. The album features guest appearances by C-Bo, Big Mike, Spice 1, Yukmouth, Kokane, Daz Dillinger, Mo B. Dick and more.

== Track listing ==
| No. | Title | Producer(s) | Length |
|---|---|---|---|
| 1. | "Majority Rules" | Keno | 3:31 |
| 2. | "Let Us All Git' Down" | T. Fleming | 2:53 |
| 3. | "Livin' Good" (featuring Diamond Dog) | T. Fleming | 4:12 |
| 4. | "Pass Da' Weed" (featuring Kokane) | T. Fleming | 3:34 |
| 5. | "Fall'n Off" (featuring Madamm Meek and Captainhook) | Captainhook | 5:50 |
| 6. | "Hustle Mines" (featuring West Coast Stone and Darryl Horne) | West Coast Stone | 3:28 |
| 7. | "B' Dare" | Zilla | 3:13 |
| 8. | "Clockwork" (featuring Chucky Workclothes) | Enocc | 2:39 |
| 9. | "Taken Ova'" (featuring Spice 1 and Yukmouth) | Don Bishop | 4:17 |
| 10. | "We Keep It Gangsta" (featuring Big Mike and C-Bo) | T. Fleming | 4:48 |
| 11. | "Win It's War" | Shawn Lambert | 3:54 |
| 12. | "Wut R' U' Afraid Of" | Keno | 4:29 |
| 13. | "Soap Opera" (featuring Madamm Meek) | T. Fleming | 3:25 |
| 14. | "Still Can't Git No Love" | College Boy | 4:26 |
| 15. | "So Gangsta" (featuring Daz Dillinger) | T. Fleming | 4:17 |
| 16. | "Karma Iz' Fa Real" (featuring Mo B. Dick) | Mo B. Dick | 3:11 |
| 17. | "On My Walter Payton" | T. Fleming | 3:46 |
