= Abominator =

Abominator may refer to:

- Abominator (album), by American horror punk/heavy metal Doyle, released in 2013
- Abominator (band), Australian heavy metal band
