= Alex Story =

Alex Story may refer to:

- Alex Story (rower), politician and retired English rower
- Alex Story (singer) ("Wolfman"; born 1974), American horror punk/heavy metal singer
