= Recapitulation =

Recapitulation may refer to:

- Recapitulation (music), a section of musical sonata form where the exposition is repeated in an altered form and the development is concluded
- Recapitulation theory, a scientific theory influential on but no longer accepted in its original form by both evolutionary and developmental biology, namely, that the congruence in form between the same embryonic developmental stages of different species is evidence that the embryos are repeating the evolutionary stages of their ancestral history
- Recapitulation theory of atonement, first clearly expressed by Irenaeus
- Recapitulation (Castaneda), a spiritual practice appearing first in the writings of Carlos Castaneda and later in those of Miguel Ángel Ruiz, Victor Sanchez and others
- Recapitulation (Dentistry-Endodontics), Recapitulation is the sequential reentry and reuse of each previous instrument. Throughout the debriding or filing process, the root canal must be recapitulated. A smaller diameter file is intermittently and finally inserted to the measured apical length and the small bits of debris that are packed into the apex are removed to ensure total canal debridement. Recapitulation is a necessity for proper endodontic success.

== See also ==
- Recap (disambiguation)
