= Doyle (band) =

American horror punk band

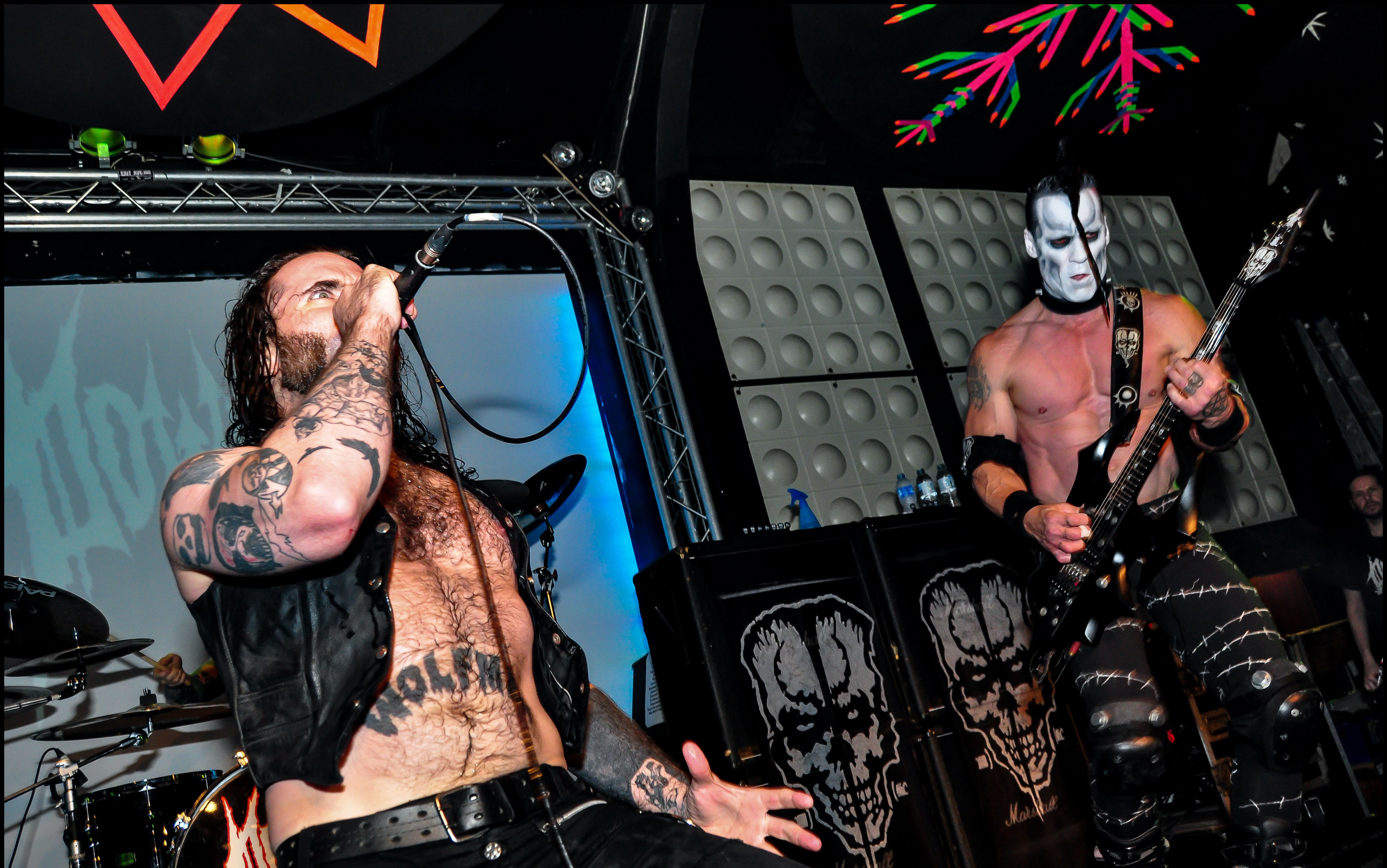
- Alex "Wolfman" Story and Doyle Wolfgang von Frankenstein performing live with the band in 2018

Background information
- Origin: Lodi, New Jersey, U.S.
- Genres: Horror punk, heavy metal
- Years active: 2012–present
- Label: Monster Man Records
- Spinoff of: Gorgeous Frankenstein
- Members: Doyle Wolfgang von Frankenstein; Alex "Wolfman" Story; Brandon Strate; Luke Wright
- Past members: Dr. Chud; Anthony "Tiny" Biuso "Left Hand" Graham; Brandon Pertzborn; Wade Murff
- Website: officialdoyle.com

Doyle is an American horror punk band formed in 2012 by Misfits guitarist Doyle Wolfgang von Frankenstein and Cancerslug frontman Alex Story. Doyle has released two studio albums.

== History ==
Doyle was formed in 2012 after guitarist Doyle Wolfgang von Frankenstein decided to break up his then-band Gorgeous Frankenstein and start a new project with a more recognizable name. The final line-up of Gorgeous Frankenstein would become Doyle's first line-up and included vocalist Alex Story (Cancerslug), drummer Dr. Chud (ex-Misfits) and bassist 'Left Hand' Graham (ex-Graves).

In July 2013, Doyle's debut album, Abominator, was released. The album's lyrics were written by Alex Story, while all the music and arrangements were written by Doyle Wolfgang von Frankenstein, who also produced the album. A tour scheduled in support of the album was delayed due to Doyle Wolfgang von Frankenstein touring with Danzig. In 2014, the band had to cancel their tour with Gwar after the death of lead vocalist Dave Brockie. That same year, Dr. Chud left the band shortly before Doyle's first "Annihilate America Tour" and was replaced by Anthony "Tiny" Biuso (ex-T.S.O.L., The Dickies and Hed (pe)) in August.

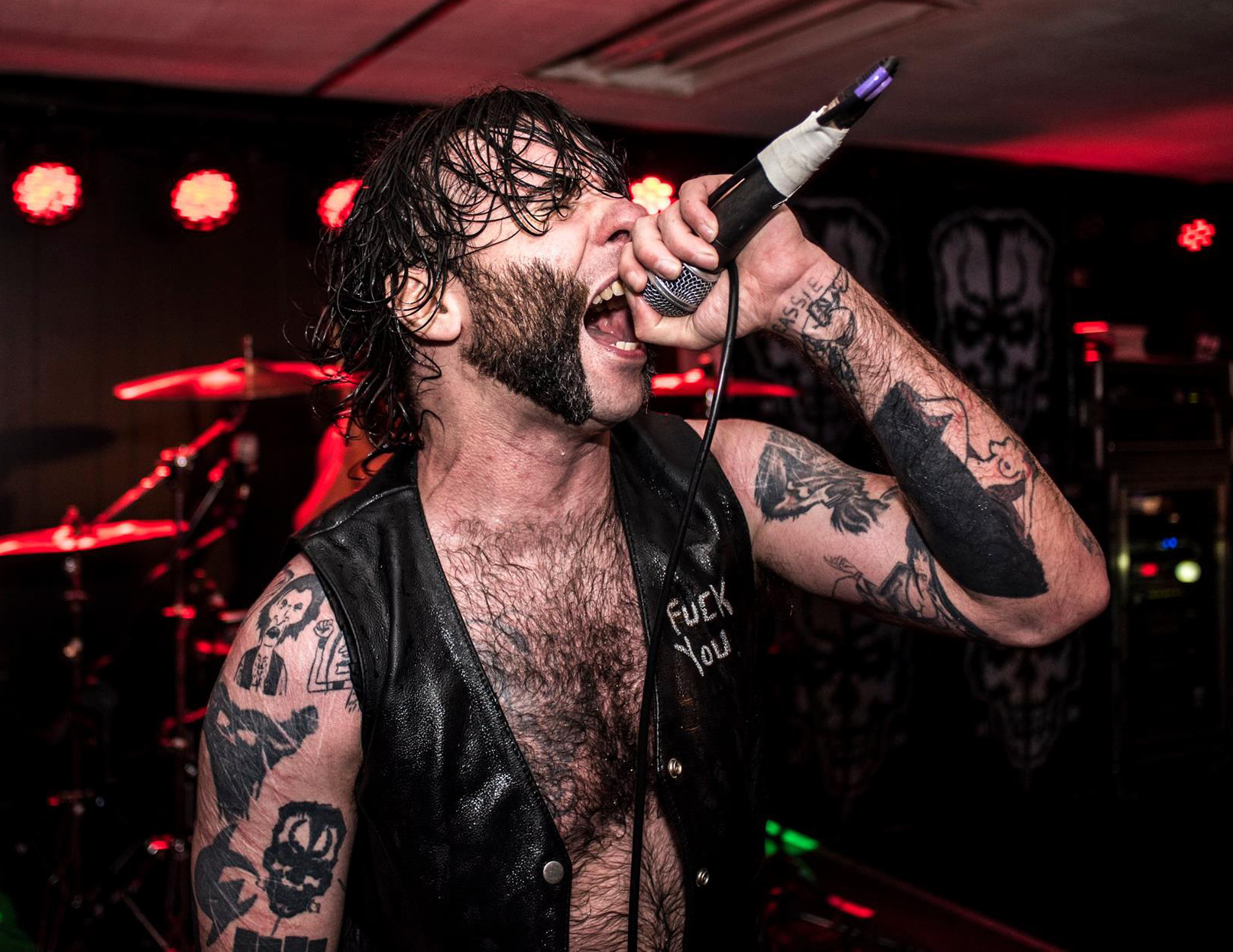
Alex Story with Doyle in 2017

In 2015, Biuso stated that he would no longer be playing with the band and was replaced by drummer Brandon Pertzborn (ex-Black Flag) shortly before the start of the "Abominator Tour 2015". In March and April 2015, the band toured as an opening act with Dope for Mushroomhead, with headlining dates continuing after into May. During the tour, bassist 'Left Hand' Graham was replaced by DieTrich Thrall. Bassist Brandon Strate (They Live) joined the band in 2015. The "Abominator Tour 2015" was dubbed the "Mad Monster tour" from September through October 2015 with special guest guitarist John 5 (Rob Zombie, ex-Marilyn Manson) who joined Doyle for a number of dates. For certain shows, the tour also featured the Family Ruin, Hatchet and Calabrese.

In 2016, Doyle Wolfgang von Frankenstein, Glenn Danzig and Jerry Only reunited the Misfits. In February 2017, Doyle embarked on the "Abominate the World Tour" in Europe in support of their debut album. The band's sophomore studio album, Doyle II: As We Die, was released in May 2017. Doyle toured in support of the album through 2017 and 2018.

Doyle was scheduled to tour alongside Life of Agony in 2020, however it was cancelled due to the Covid-19 pandemic. Doyle returned to touring in 2022, embarking on the "Abominate the World as We Die" tour in the Spring of that year. In Spring 2024, Doyle once again embarked on another US headlining tour with Red Devil Vortex serving as support.

== Style ==
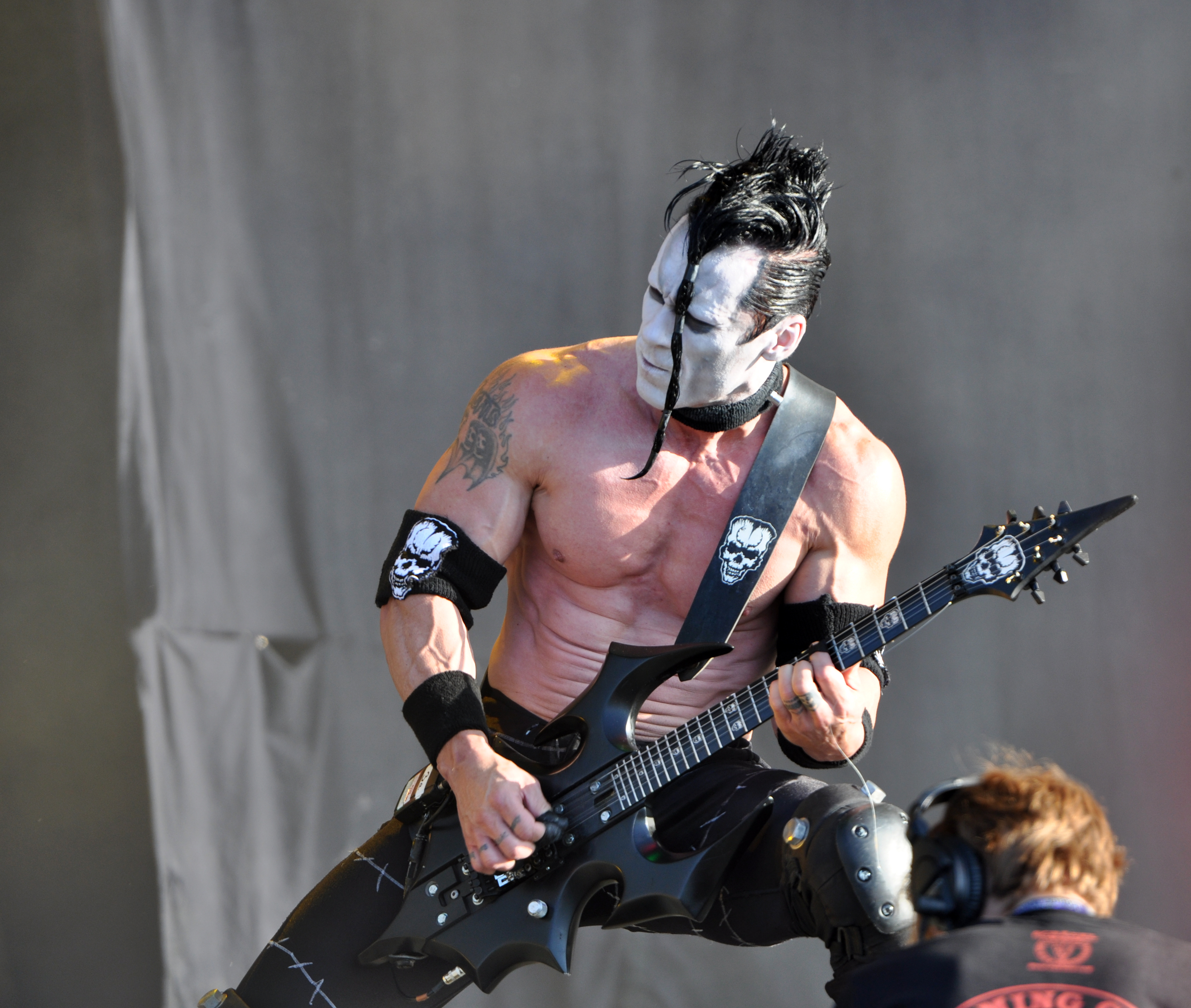
Doyle Wolfgang von Frankenstein performing at Wacken Open Air 2013

Doyle's musical style is a combination of punk rock and heavy metal with horror lyrics. When performing live, both Doyle Wolfgang von Frankenstein and Alex Story adopt the look of monsters from vintage horror movies. Doyle uses make-up akin to "Frankenstein's monster" and wears a devilock hairstyle, while Story sports large sideburns and often disguises himself as a werewolf inspired by the 1940s movie The Wolf Man.

Story describes Doyle's make-up transformation as follows:

When he puts that [stage makeup] on, that's like warpaint or something. It's like he's going into battle. He literally transforms himself. [...] He just seem[s] like an animal, like a monster.

== Members ==
=== Current members ===
- Doyle Wolfgang von Frankenstein – guitars (2012–present)
- Alex "Wolfman" Story – lead vocals (2012–present)
- Brandon Strate – bass, backing vocals (2015–present)
- Luke Wright – drums (2023–present)

=== Former members ===
- "Left Hand" Graham – bass (2012–2015)
- Dr. Chud – drums (2012–2014)
- Anthony "Tiny" Biuso – drums (2014–2015)
- Brandon Pertzborn – drums (2015–2017)
- Wade Murff – drums (2017–2023)

== Discography ==
=== Studio albums ===
- Abominator (2013)
- Doyle II: As We Die (2017)
