= The Recap =

Compilation album by Mr. Envi'
- Released: January 7, 2014
- Recorded: 2008–13
- Genre: Southern hip hop
- Length: 32:04
- Label: Tate Music Group
- Producer: Mr. Envi', MistaTBeatz, Truehillz

Mr. Envi' chronology
Point of No Return (2013)	The Recap (2014)	Damage Kontrol (2015)

The Recap is a compilation album by rapper Mr. Envi'. It was released on January 7, 2014, by Tate Music Group, then later re-released under his own brand.

== Track listing ==
1. Back It Off (featuring Jeramie of TRT) — 3:00
2. I'mma Boss — 3:55
3. Re Up — 3:17
4. Spotlight — 3:00
5. Where U From (featuring JB) — 3:05
6. Get At Me — 3:25
7. Don't Wait (featuring JTL) — 3:32
8. Keep It Poppin' (featuring S.G.) — 4:16
9. Do It Big (featuring S.G. & Bigg Redd) — 4:28
