= Overview =

Overview may refer to:

- Overview article, an article that summarizes the current state of understanding on a topic
- Overview map, generalised view of a geographic area

== See also ==
- Summary (disambiguation)
- Outline (list)
- A Brief Overview
- Overview and Scrutiny
- Overview effect
