= Country Boy Livin' =

Studio album by Young Bleed and Chucky Workclothes
- Released: July 1, 2014
- Recorded: 2013
- Genre: Hip hop
- Length: 50:02
- Label: Trap Door Entertainment, Express Life Entertainment

Young Bleed chronology
Preserved (2011)	Country Boy Livin (2014)	Livin' (2017)

Chucky Workclothes chronology
Country Boy Livin (2014)	Tax Season (2015)

Country Boy Livin is a collaborative album by American rappers Young Bleed and Chucky Workclothes. The album was released on July 1, 2014, by Trap Door Entertainment and Express Life Entertainment. A promotional mixtape of the album titled "Country Boy Livin' (Blendtape) was released on DatPiff a month prior to its release.

== Track listings ==
1. Intro (Pick'em up Nelson) - 0:33
2. Coming to Your Town - 3:08
3. Paperwork - 3:14
4. Long Days and Highways (featuring Joey Souf) - 5:15
5. Country Boy Gangstas - 3:17
6. Skit (Pick'em up Nelson) - 0:19
7. Alright Already - 3:36
8. Who's Who (featuring Ko) - 3:09
9. Get It On - 3:15
10. Clockwork - 2:40
11. Shut Shit Down - 3:47
12. Livin' Up (featuring Millaboi) - 3:46
13. Skit (Pick'em up Nelson) - 0:48
14. All Country (featuring Big Mike) - 4:35
15. Break-A-Bitch College (featuring Philthy Phil) - 3:47
16. Legendary - 2:48
17. Outro (Pick'em up Nelson) - 2:15
