= Tha 40oz =

EP by Mr. Envi'
- Released: July 27, 2018
- Recorded: 2018
- Genre: Hip hop
- Length: 20:46
- Label: Southern Stisles Records
- Producer: MistaTBeatz, JTL

Mr. Envi' chronology
All Nite Grind (2017)	Tha 40oz (2018)

Tha 40oz is the fourth EP by American rapper Mr. Envi'. The EP was released on July 27, 2018, by his record label Southern Stisles Records and distributed by Symphonic Distribution. The EP features guest appearances from JTL, Mr. HympDok, Big Ced and MistaTBeatz. The EP went on to receive positive reviews from music blogs and critics.

== Background ==
On July 3, 2018, it was announced that Tha 40oz was scheduled to be released on July 27, 2018. It was hinted earlier this year via his Facebook account, that Mr. Envi' was working on new music shortly after releasing a single in March. In July 2018, during an interview with Sound of Now, Mr. Envi' stated that "Tha 40oz EP was really a spur of the moment kinda thing" and that it only took him a week to write and record the EP from start to finish. The first single to be released off of the EP was "I Gotchu", and was released on Monday, July 9, with a music video to follow a week after the release.

Professional ratings
Review scores
Source	Rating
Skope Magazine	(positive)
its Hip Hop Music	(positive)
Sound of Now	5/5 stars

== Track listing ==
No.	Title	Producer(s)	Length
1.	"40oz Intro"		0:41
2.	"I Gotchu"	JTL	3:11
3.	"Tell Me Wutchu Want" (featuring Mr. Hympdok and JTL)	MistaTBeatz	3:52
4.	"Candy Car Driva" (featuring JTL)	JTL	2:50
5.	"Skit"		0:27
6.	"Wutchu Mean" (featuring Big Ced)	JTL	3:20
7.	"Same Old M.E."	MistaTBeatz	3:15
8.	"Chest Out" (featuring MistaTBeatz)	MistaTBeatz	3:10
