= Rydaz Redemption =

Studio album by Mr. Envi'
- Released: August 23, 2011
- Recorded: 2010–2011
- Genre: Southern hip hop
- Length: 47:14
- Label: Southern Stisles Records
- Producer: MistaT, Fuol, MoneyCDE, Truehillz

Mr. Envi' chronology
Rydaz Redemption (2011)	Kollaborationz (2012)

Professional ratings
Review scores
Source	Rating
Sputnikmusic	2.5/5 stars

Rydaz Redemption is the debut album by rapper Mr. Envi'. It was released on August 23, 2011.

== Track listing ==
1. Intro — 1:00
2. I'mma Boss — 3:55
3. In Tha Streets (featuring J.B. & Money) — 3:02
4. Lavish (featuring Blade) — 3:35
5. I Just Wanna (featuring Truehillz & S.G. — 3:35
6. Spotlight — 3:00
7. Cold Outside — 4:10
8. I Be On Tha Block (featuring Blade) — 3:30
9. Gettin' To Tha Paper (featuring Mista T, Fuol, S.G., Mayjor & Bigg Redd) — 4:00
10. Do Tha Thang (featuring S.G. & Keyki') — 4:44
11. Boss Shit (featuring Money) — 4:50
12. Get At Me — 3:25
13. Do It Big (featuring S.G. & Bigg Redd) — 4:28
