= Perception management =

Influence tactic

Perception management is a term originated by the US military. The US Department of Defense (DOD) gives this definition:

Actions to convey and/or deny selected information and indicators to foreign audiences to influence their emotions, motives, and objective reasoning as well as to intelligence systems and leaders at all levels to influence official estimates, ultimately resulting in foreign behaviors and official actions favorable to the originator's objectives. In various ways, perception management combines truth projection, operations security, cover and deception, and psychological operations.

"Perception" is defined as the "process by which individuals select, organize, and interpret the input from their senses to give meaning and order to the world around them". This definition overlaps with the higher-order perceptual processes as defined biologically (the lower-order biological processes are not susceptible to management; these low-level processes include underlying perceptual categorization performed prior to conscious categorization.). Components of perception include the perceiver, target of perception, and the situation.

Factors that influence the perceiver include:

- Schema: organization and interpretation of information based on past experiences and knowledge
- Motivational state: needs, values, and desires of a perceiver at the time of perception
- Mood: emotions of the perceiver at the time of perception

Factors that influence the target include:

- Ambiguity: a lack of clarity. If ambiguity increases, the perceiver may find it harder to form an accurate perception
- Social status: a person's real or perceived position in society or in an organization
- Impression management: an attempt to control the perceptions or impressions of others. Targets are likely to use impression management tactics when interacting with perceivers who have power over them. Several impression management tactics include behavioral matching between the target of perception and the perceiver, self-promotion (presenting one's self in a positive light), conforming to situational norms, appreciating others, or being consistent.

== History ==
The phrase "perception management" has often functioned as a euphemism for "an aspect of information warfare." A scholar in the field notes a distinction between "perception management" and public diplomacy, which "does not, as a rule, involve falsehood and deception, whereas these are important ingredients of perception management; the purpose is to get the other side to believe what one wishes it to believe, whatever the truth may be."

The phrase "perception management" is filtering into common use as a synonym for "persuasion." Public relations firms now offer "perception management" as one of their services. Similarly, public officials who are being accused of shading the truth are now frequently charged with engaging in "perception management" when disseminating information to media or to the general public.

Although perception management operations are typically carried out within the international arena between governments, and between governments and citizens, use of perception management techniques have become part of mainstream information management systems in many ways that do not concern military campaigns or government relations with citizenry. Businesses may even contract with other businesses to conduct perception management for them, or they may conduct it in-house with their public relations staff.

As Stan Moore has written, "Just because truth has been omitted, does not mean that truth is not true. Just because reality has not been perceived, does not mean that it is not real."

== Strategies ==
There are nine strategies for perception management. According to Carlo Kopp, these include:

1. Preparation – Having clear goals and knowing the ideal position you want people to hold.
2. Credibility – Make sure all of your information is consistent, often using prejudices or expectations to increase credibility.
3. Multichannel support – Have multiple arguments and fabricated facts to reinforce your information.
4. Centralized control – Employing entities such as propaganda ministries or bureaus.
5. Security – The nature of the deception campaign is known by few.
6. Flexibility – The deception campaign adapts and changes over time as needs change.
7. Coordination – The organization or propaganda ministry is organized in a hierarchical pattern in order to maintain consistent and synchronized distribution of information.
8. Concealment – Contradicting information is hidden.
9. Untruthful statements – Fabricate the truth.

== Organizational ==
Organizations use perception management in daily internal and external interactions as well as prior to major product/strategy introductions and following events of crisis. Life cycle models of organizational development suggest that the growth and ultimate survival of a firm is dependent on how effectively business leaders navigate crisis, or crisis-like, events through their life cycles.

As suggested by studies, organizational perception management involves actions that are designed and carried out by organizational spokespersons to influence audiences' perceptions of the organization. This definition is based on the understanding of four unique components of organizational perception management: perception of the organization; actions or tactics; organizational spokespersons; and organizational audiences. The organizational perceptions is further classified into three major forms namely organizational images, organizational reputation, and organizational identities.

=== Events ===
Perception management is often used by an organization in the following major events:

1. Dealing with perception-threatening events: Include such events as scandals, accidents, product failures, controversial identity changes, upcoming performance reviews, and introduction of new identity or vision.
2. Dealing with perception-enhancing events: Include such events as positive/negative ranking or rating by industry groups, overcoming hardships, and achievement of desired goals.

Following are the examples of perception management in relation to specific organizations or communities:

== US government ==
Beginning in the 1950s, news media and public information organizations and individuals carried out assignments to manage the public's perception of the CIA, according to the New York Times. Carl Bernstein wrote in 1977 that "The CIA in the 1950s, '60s, and even early 70s had concentrated its relationships with journalists in the most prominent sectors of the American press corps, including four or five of the largest newspaper in the country, the broadcast networks, and the two major weekly news magazines." David Atlee Phillips, a former CIA station chief in Mexico City, described the method of recruitment years later to Bernstein: "Somebody from the Agency says, 'I want you to sign a piece of paper before I tell you what it's about.' I didn't hesitate to sign, and a lot of newsmen didn't hesitate over the next twenty years."

The term "perception management" is not new to the lexicon of government language. For years the FBI has listed foreign perception management as one of eight "key issue threats" to national security, including it with terrorism, attacks on critical US infrastructure, and weapons proliferation among others. The FBI clearly recognizes perception management as a threat when it is directed at the US by foreign governments.

=== Department of Defense ===
Deception and sleight of hand are important in gaining advantages in war, both to gain domestic support of the operations and for the military against the enemy. Although perception management is specifically defined as being limited to foreign audiences, critics of the DOD charge that it also engages in domestic perception management. An example cited is the prohibition of viewing or photographing the flag draped caskets of dead military as they are unloaded in bulk upon arrival in the U.S. for further distribution, a policy only recently implemented. The DOD also describes perception management as an intent to provoke the behavior one wants out of a given individual. During the Cold War, The Pentagon sent undercover US journalists to Russia and Eastern Europe to write pro-American articles for local media outlets. A similar situation occurred in Iraq in 2005 when the US military covertly paid Iraqi newspapers to print stories written by US soldiers; these stories were geared towards enhancing the appearance of the US mission in Iraq.

Domestically, during the Vietnam War, critics allege the Pentagon exaggerated communist threats to the United States in order to gain more public support for an increasingly bloody war. This was similarly seen in 2003 with accusations that the government embellished the threat and existence of weapons of mass destruction in Iraq.

The US military has demonstrated using perception management multiple times in modern warfare, even though it has proven to take a hit to its credibility among the American people. In late 2001 after 9/11, Defense Secretary Donald H. Rumsfeld created the Pentagon's Office of Strategic Influence (OSI). When it came to light, the Pentagon was initially criticized for simply using a perception management office to influence foreign states. The OSI was dismantled less than five months after its creation when sources alleged to the press that one of its goals was domestic influence, similar to the Iran-Contra era Office of Public Diplomacy. Shortly after, the Office of Special Plans was created with a more focused goal of selective intelligence vetting outside the normal chartered intelligence apparatus, with foreign propaganda activities moved to the Office of Information Activities under the direction of the Assistant Secretary of Defense for Special Operations and Low Intensity Conflict. In fact, strategic influence, special plans, psychological operations, and perception management are all direct synonyms within the DoD.

More recently, the DOD has continued to pursue actively a course of perception management about the Iraq War. "The Department of Defense is conscious that there is an increasingly widespread public perception that the U.S. military is becoming brutalized by the campaign in Iraq. Recognizing its vulnerability to information and media flows, the DoD has identified the information domain as its new 'asymmetric flank.'"

The level of use of perception management is continuing to grow throughout the Army. Until recently specialists, known as psychological operations officers and civil affairs officers, whose only purpose is to decide how to present information to the media and to the people of the current country that they are in only held positions in high division levels of command. The Army has decided that it is now necessary that these specialists be included in the transformed brigades and deal with "everything from analyzing the enemy's propaganda leaflets to talking with natives to see what the Army can do to make them their friends", said 3rd Brigade's Civil Affairs Officer Maj. Glenn Tolle.

== Business ==
Businesses shape the perceptions of the public in order to get the desired behavior and purchase patterns from consumers.

=== Advertising ===
In terms of advertising and brand image, without a perception to manage, no other form of communication can happen. That highlights the importance of the brand image. However, some research indicates that just being a known brand dramatically affects how consumers perceive it. A consumer may rationalize that if they have heard of a brand, the company must be spending a fair sum on advertising. If it is spending a lot on advertising, then the company must be reasonably profitable which means that other consumers must be buying the product and they must be satisfied enough with its performance; therefore, the product must be of reasonable quality. Sometimes managing perception can simply just mean giving consumers a perception. Advertising, without even considering its message and quality, adds to consumer opinions in a positive light.

=== Brand management ===
Companies often use brand management in an attempt to change a potential customer's perception of the product's value. Through positive association, a brand manager can strengthen the company's marketing and gain brand value. This is an important step in perception management because it aims at producing the most effective results. Brand management deals with competitors, promotions, costs, and satisfaction in order to earn trust from consumers and show positive feedback.

=== Leadership ===
People can use perception management as a way to positively enhance their leadership abilities. A person's ability to manage perceptions is what sets great leaders apart. What people – followers – appraise as effectiveness and ability as a leader becomes their perception, which then becomes reality. Unmanaged perceptions of a person's followers create a reality opposite to what was wanted.

=== Marketing ===
The best medium for businesses to affect the perceptions of the public is through marketing. To get people to buy products, marketers must identify a need and manage the perception of the public so that they feel the product will fulfill that need.

This is not the same thing as manipulation, where businesses create something people don't need, and marketers convince them that they do need it. Good perception management is to the benefit of the consumer, as it fulfills more of the customer's needs, and to the benefit of the business, as it increases their revenue.

In some marketing schemas, marketers create a need that was not present and then offer to fulfill that need. A good example of this is credit card companies. Credit card companies are companies that, like most other companies, started off by providing a convenience to the population.

Credit cards offer an alternative method of payment to cash or check and make life simpler for many people; however, today there are over 600 million credit cards issued in the United States alone and four major credit card companies. It is no longer even possible to buy a car, get a home loan, or rent an apartment from many companies without a positive credit score.

This fact has necessitated the need for almost every citizen to have a credit card. However, many credit cards companies manage their perception to make sure that people continue to need credit cards, and control their perception so that many people do not fully understand what they are getting into. However, the fact that the average household in the United States is in over fifteen thousand dollars' worth of debt never reaches the widespread public. Instead, they publicize how they will help if a card gets stolen, or that they have the lowest interest percentage compared to the other major competitors. But no company tells their customers that the promoted interest rate more than doubles if they do not pay the minimum balance on time. For instance, Discover's interest rate increases to 18.99% after the first minimum balance is not paid on time.

In short, though credit cards are convenient and fulfill a need, the companies often make no mention of the negative effects that they might have on many of their users.

=== Risk management ===
The decision-making process in relation to the future is an element of business that has a great effect on the company's future. If the company is too risk-averse, this leads to underperformance and a missed opportunity. If the company takes too many risks, it is likely that there will be a large amount of losses. Ultimately if this amount of risk-taking leads the perception of the company to exceed the boundaries of logic and fact, the company will most likely fail based on their poor perception. Companies today cannot afford not to manage perceptions. Though not a substitute for a substantial product, it is useful in "sustaining the offering" for a length of time.

=== International communication ===
The communication gaps that exist in international business can lead to misunderstandings. Perception management helps to prevent the complex emotional characteristics of communication from changing the original interpretation of the message. Perception management also serves to change the original interpretation of the message in order to prevent complex emotional characteristics in communication.

== Food and nutrition ==
Food and beverage manufacturers can manage the perceptions of consumers by controlling information on food labels. The Food and Drug Administration (FDA) requires a label on most food sold in grocery stores. However, the FDA does not regulate dietary supplements. Many chain restaurants also try to make their food appear to be healthier but serve too large of a portion.

Here are some deceptive practices:

- Distribute sugar amounts among many ingredients
- Include "healthy" ingredients to make it appear to be healthy
- Use scientific names of ingredients to mask their nutritional value
- Use advertising or catch phrases to sell their product
- Not including contaminants (heavy metal, toxic substances)
- Using phrases like "zero grams of trans fat" because there is less than one gram in the serving size. This means there can be more than a gram of trans fat in the product though.
- Saying that a product is "packed in fiber" when that fiber may not be whole grain fiber. That means the fiber is coming from a less nutritious or healthy source.
- Using doctor recommendations or seals of approval on products to sell them. Companies are not even required to have doctors say that to use it on their packaging.
- A product can be "low fat" but that does not mean it is low in calories. A product's name can also be misleading. For instance, the food industry advertises high fructose corn syrup as being made from corn without artificial ingredients, having the same calories as sugar and acceptable when used in moderation. Despite its name, high fructose corn syrup is simply a sugar made from corn or an added sugar in the diet. It is not high in fructose as its name would suggest. High fructose corn syrup is composed of the same two simple sugars (fructose and glucose) as table sugar, honey and maple syrup.

Perception management is essentially a means for which an image or reputation can be created and maintained, whether it is true or not. On September 24, 2011, The American Dietetic Association announced it would change its name to the Academy of Nutrition and Dietetics. In this case, the ADA is adjusting its name to more accurately describe the organization. According to Escott-Stump, "The name Academy of Nutrition and Dietetics promotes the strong science background and academic expertise of our members." It is thought that by adding the word nutrition to its name, the organization is better able to communicate its ability to transfer nutritional science and research into healthy lifestyles and foods everyone can understand. Also, by keeping dietetics, it creates a connection between the new research and the history and reputation ADA has as a food and science-based profession. Escott-Stump reassured the public that although the name is changing, the organization's mission will remain the same as it has been for nearly 100 years.

== Alcohol ==
The Society for the Study of Addiction published a paper by researchers at the Deakin University School of Psychology, Australia, about a study of use of public relations companies by the alcohol industry. The study proposes that "...alcohol industry 'social aspects/public relations' organizations (SAPROs) serve the agenda of lending credibility to industry claims of corporate responsibility while promoting ineffective industry-friendly interventions (such as school-based education or TV advertising campaigns) and creating doubt about interventions which have a strong evidence base (such as higher taxes on alcoholic beverages)."

The study concluded that Australian SAPRO Drinkwise "has been used by the alcohol industry to create an impression of social responsibility while promoting interventions that maintain profits and campaigning against effective interventions such as higher taxes on alcohol".

== Fashion and design ==
Perception management is a robust component in the fashion industry. Fashion stylists are responsible for providing perception management in the branding of products, and in creating the public persona of both individuals, businesses, and brands, through means of wardrobe, appearance, and communication skills. As with any product, perception management influences purchasing decisions. According to one analyst, "In the external environment, the offerings of competitors, with which a customer compares a product or service will change, thus altering his perception of the best offer around. Another point is that the public opinion towards certain issues can change. This effect can reach from fashion trends to the public expectation of good corporate citizenship." Other effects of perception management in fashion include that "a commonplace strategy to circumvent the loss of exclusivity associated with high market share is to leverage the brand by introducing new related brands. This is very efficient with fragrances or fashion brands."

== Celebrity ==
Public relation firms are now offering services to celebrity clients in perception management or reputation repair. It is a new tool for public firms that lets large firms pour huge resources to the public through websites. The web helps public relations executives to reach out the news media and it offer ways to link the public relations people and news media. For example, firms provide direct email addresses of some business journalists. A new trend in perception management is athletes signing with major public relation firms. Well-known agencies, such as William Morris and competitor Creative Artists Agency, recently started attracting huge sports stars. Alex Rodriguez joined the company after his alleged affair with Madonna, during the summer of 2008. He is following in the footsteps of Serena Williams, Kevin Garnett, and Vince Young, who are all represented by the William Morris agency. In the case of Britney Spears, the media has tarnished and skewed the way she is perceived by the public. In a short January 2007 interview conducted by contactmusic.com, Spears exclaims, "the media has had a lot of fun exaggerating my every move". Another case of media skewing our interpretation of celebrities is in the case of Miley Cyrus. After her music video controversy, Can't Be Tamed, her album sales declined to 72% less than her 2008 solo debut, Breakout.

== Technology and privacy ==
Results from a survey conducted in Hamburg in 2006 suggest that closed-circuit television (CCTV) has little to do with manufacturing security/feelings of safety among people. It seems that preceding spatial perceptions have a greater impact on whether a certain space or place is regarded as being unsafe or not.

== Universities ==
A research article in the journal Disability & Society gives an account of students with hidden disabilities and their experience with the behavior of their peers when their disability is revealed. These students actively manage the perception of others because the awareness of their disability "altered the behavior of others towards them".

== Foreign policy and terrorism ==
Perception management has long been a key issue in the United States government. Beginning in the 1950s, the CIA contracted out several hundred different public information and news agencies for different "assignments". This practice grew, and currently operates with several thousand initiatives helping to privately shape public opinion of the government. Indeed, the Department of Defense views perception management as a psychological operation aimed at eliciting the desired behavior by manipulating the opinions of both enemies and friends. Best put by the DOD directly, "Perception management combines truth projection, operations security, cover and deception, and psychological operations." Since the U.S. engaged in the war on terror, perception management tactics have become vital to military success and relations with other countries.

... It is absolutely vital that the Perception Management campaign of the United States and its allies be coordinated at the highest possible level, that it be resourced adequately, and executed effectively. Properly coordinated, such a campaign could be a war-winning capability. When left uncoordinated, such operations will achieve only modest success, at best, and at worst, could seriously backfire. Even a poorly chosen word, used in the heat of the moment (e.g. 'crusade'), can have significant negative consequences.

Typical counter-terrorism (CT) thinking focuses on the violence, or its associated threat, to identify and exploit associated avenues for meaningful response and reaction.

== Politics ==
Perception management in politics is referred to as "political marketing strategy", or "strategic political marketing". It originated from traditional business marketing strategies applied to politics, largely for the purpose of winning elections. Political parties and actors can choose between two fundamental methods: leading the market or following the market. Leading the market involves fulfilling underlying demands of principle, and a political actor would essentially assume the position of one who leads on their own ideas and principles. Following the market entails the political actor's reliance on research such as public opinion surveys and adoption of those principles and ideas held by the majority of the people who the political actor wishes to influence.

Central to political marketing is the concept of strategic political postures—positions organizations assume to prompt the desired perceptions in a target group. Each strategic political posture relies on a different mix of leading and following, and includes four general types of postures:

- the political lightweight: neither leads nor follows very well; does not represent a posture easily sustained; is not confident in own ideals or particularly concerned with adapting to the needs and wants of constituents.
- the convinced ideologist: leads exceedingly well, holding its own opinions and endeavoring to convince others of their merit.
- the tactical populist: emphasizes following to achieve power; focuses on adopting political policies that appeal to a majority in order to attain the political power necessary to implement a party's goals.
- the relationship builder: both leads and follows; has confidence in own ideas but able to adapt to the needs and wants of constituents.

Political market orientation (PMO) originated from commercial market orientation strategies applied to a political environment. Developed by Robert Ormrod, the comprehensive PMO model involves four attitudinal constructs and four behavioral methods:

Organizational attitudes include:

- Internal orientation: focuses on including and acknowledging the importance of other party members and their opinions
- Voter orientation: focuses on the importance of current and future voters and the awareness of their needs.
- Competitor orientation: focuses on awareness of competitors' positions and strengths, and acknowledges that cooperation with competing parties can advance the party's long-term goals.
- External orientation: focuses on the importance of parties that are neither voters nor competitors, including media, interest groups, and lobbyists.

Organizational behaviors include:

- Information generation: focuses on gathering information about every party involved in a given issue.
- Information dissemination: focuses on receiving and communicating information, both formally and informally.
- Member participation: focuses on involving all party members, through vigorous discussion and debate, to create a consistent party strategy.
- Consistent Strategy Implementation: focuses on implementing consistent, established strategies through formal and informal channels.

== Journalism ==
Journalism is a field that organizations, companies, governments, and individuals will attempt to use to manage the public's perception of that specific organization, company, government, or person. Perception management through journalism has been seen especially in regard to government propaganda and war. This becomes problematic when governments promote certain ideas that they want the public to believe through journalism, without the journalists and media properly attributing their sources.

Another issue in the journalism field is between the corporate business of keeping a news organization afloat versus the ethics of reporting and reporting the truth. Just as with any other major corporation or even small businesses there are conflicts between the reporters and the executives within a news organization. Reporters with strong ethics will want to run all stories that are "newsworthy", but some of those stories may be censored by editors because the executives have sent a note down the chain specifying that a certain story may or may not run.

== Psychology ==
In restaurants, the staff will frequently overestimate the wait time for a group of customers to be seated because when they are seated quicker, they experience increased satisfaction and perceive the restaurant in a more favorable manner. Psychology is important for perception management to be effective, because knowing the way the human mind functions and thinks is necessary to give the customers the satisfaction they want and expect.

== Athletics ==
Baseball player Sammy Sosa used perception management after he was ejected from a game in 2003 when he was caught using a corked bat. His explanation was that he only uses the corked bat for batting practice so he can hit more home runs and put on a show for fans. He claimed picking up the corked bat for the game was an honest mistake and apologized to everybody. The perception of hitting home runs even with the corked bat could have helped Sammy Sosa hit future home runs without a corked bat because he knew what it felt like to hit a home run and he knew that he could do it, especially when he got away with using the corked bat in games. Golfer Arnold Palmer used perception management as well. In the 1960 U.S. Open, Palmer saw the first hole at Cherry Hills as an eagle opportunity. He perceived that if he could simply drive the ball into the longer rough in order to slow it down before it rolled across the very fast green, he could make the putt for eagle. Many doubted Palmer when he spoke of doing so, but that did not stop him. Palmer did exactly what he perceived of doing, making the eagle, and later going on to win. A study performed in June 2008 revealed that perception is closely correlated with performance. Nine different sized black circles were glued onto a white background. After a round of golf, forty-six golfers were asked which black circle was the size of the hole on the putting greens. The players with the overall better scores perceived the hole to be bigger than it actually is, so they chose the bigger black circles. The players with the worse scores perceived the hole as being smaller than it actually is.

=== Training ===
For many years people viewed concussions and big tackles in football games as athletes just "getting their bell rung" and coaches implored them to "shake it off and get back in the game". However, a concussion is a traumatic brain injury that may temporarily interfere with the way the brain works and can affect memory, judgment, reflexes, speech, balance, coordination and sleep patterns.

A study from the National Center for Injury Prevention found that 47 percent of high school football players say they suffer a concussion each season, with 37 percent of those reporting multiple concussions in a season. Serious injuries deserve appropriate attention to treatment and to prevention. With a concussion, function may be interrupted but there is no structural damage to the brain, so a physical examination often appears normal. The American College of Sports Medicine estimates that 85 percent of sports-related concussions go undiagnosed because athletes deny or fail to report symptoms and because subtle changes in brain function may not be obvious on a single examination.

In May 2008, the CDC implemented new standards for concussion management, which required athletes who are involved in a play where a concussion was possible (a direct blow to the head) to be evaluated by a certified athletic trainer or a qualified physician if available. The standards go on to say that if the athlete has any signs of a concussion, they are not able to return to play for the rest of the game or practice.

According to the New York Times, this seems like a good policy in theory, but with football season being over for a large majority of high schools (football having the highest risk of concussion), experts found that athletes have found ways to get around the standards, such as denying any concussion symptoms they are having, learning how to answer questions to hide any signs of concussion, or not saying anything about the possible concussion to the athletic trainer or physician working at the game. With these strategies, athletes put themselves at risk for the "second concussion", which can leave permanent brain damage and can even lead to death.

Although in theory these new standards for concussions are great for significantly reducing the risk of missing symptoms that appear after 24 hours and preventing any further brain damage, but with athletes now hiding possible concussions from athletic trainers and physicians, these standards may actually have a negative effect on concussion management.

=== Sponsorship ===
Perception management is the idea of using an image as a tool for identification of sponsorship opportunities. An effective sponsorship relationship outlines a good match between the image the company wants to promote and the image of the sponsored body, and if successful, elevates both. Perception management directs both behavior and communication activities as it works towards the establishment of a common vision of reality in a given social group. In the case of Tiger Woods, the sales of his clothing brand, which is part of Nike Golf, have drastically declined since his scandal due to perception management.

=== Environmental impacts ===
Professional sports teams in the United States are beginning to engage in corporate pro-environmental behavior (CPEB). Many sports leagues and teams have pledged commitments to sustainability in areas such as their facilities, venues, and major events. Even events on a global scale such as the Olympic Games and FIFA World Cup, emphatically have endorsed the reduction of their environmental impacts. Not only can the teams benefit economically and ecologically, but "for-profit businesses may also engage in CPEB in order to control its public image, reputation, and identity." They want to make sure they are in good standing with the public since they realize that many of them now relate to the "green" lifestyle.

While fans act as the consumers of the teams product's and events, non-fans can also "have significant influence as voters on sport facility subsidization referendums". That being said, it is very important for the sports teams to maintain a positive image, and "going green" can do just that.

=== Signing ===
Conflicts of interest and consolidation in the sports agency industry arise through "the fierce competition to sign and retain athletes".

The majority of literature regarding employee-organization relationships focus on perceived organizational support. More specifically, "the primary purposes of this study were to: (a) examine the antecedents of POS; (b) examine the consequences of POS, including, affective commitment, job satisfaction, and turnover intention; and (c) assess gender differences in regard to these antecedents and consequences, and (d) develop and test a comprehensive model of POS, applicable to intercollegiate athletic administrators."

== Censorship in China ==
The Propaganda and Information Leading Group is generally responsible for censorship and control of information. The unit is also one of the largest in the CCP leadership organ.

Chinese military scholars argue that their nation has a long history of conducting "psychological operations", a phrase that connotes important aspects of strategic deception and, to a certain degree, what the US Department of Defense portrays as perception management. For example, several articles published by the PLA's Academy of Military Science (AMS) journal Zhongguo Junshi Kexue, examine psychological warfare and psychological operations mainly as a deception-oriented function of military strategy.

The Chinese government has also used strategies to manage the perception of their country to the rest of the world. Facing criticisms about its questionable domestic human rights policies, the Chinese government successfully deflected international media's attention during the 2008 Beijing Summer Olympics to the apolitical Olympic ideals by creating intensive coverage of the positive feedback for the Olympics on paper, TV, and online, despite governmental officers' promises to improve their poor history of protecting human rights when Beijing was still competing for the right to host the game in 2001.

The images and video captured that night by Chinese media would display only the packed, patriotic crowds and nothing of the rest of the celebrants, who were largely occupied with taking photos of themselves with friends, family, and even security personnel. The Beijing games were also an opportunity for China to show its rapid development. The presence of a large contingent of foreign businessmen, media, and politicians necessitated a strict system of perception management before and during the Olympic Games. The government wanted to ensure that it could use this opportunity to portray China as positively as possible by showcasing its development and modernity rather than some of its more internationally disliked features such as its domestic human rights policies and frequent government protests.

China looked at its opportunity to host the Olympic Games as "a definitive demonstration of its status as a world partner comparable to any power in the Western world". They made certain that those who would be directly talking to the media had the "right" talking points; mostly these focused on promoting the stability and dominance of China's economy. The government restructured the landscape of Beijing to portray a sense of modernity to foreigners. Three new buildings called the "bird buildings" were constructed at a high cost, forcing a large number of residents to relocate. A couple of new subway lines are also built to increase the convenience for foreigners to reach the Olympic village.

The government also did whatever it could to make the opening ceremonies of the Beijing Olympics more impressive and extravagant than any before. An example of how they managed perceptions in this realm was the intentional substitution of a more attractive girl, Lin Miaoke, to lip-sync "Ode to the Motherland" instead of using the original singer. In their opinion of the officials in charge, the original singer wasn't attractive enough to favorably represent China.

Beijing's security forces were also greatly increased before and during the Olympic Games to ensure that no large protests could be started and possibly caught on camera by the media. Re-education camps and imprisonment were possible punishments for Chinese citizens who made known a desire to protest around the Games. The government also announced a few days prior to the opening ceremonies that three "demonstration parks" would be opened for protests, requiring a written request form five days in advance, although none of the requests were granted. Promotional materials are also made as ideal as possible, for example the slogan "One World, One Dream" referring to a unifying ideal of "love for all mankind". There was even the creation of a slogan ("Beijing Welcomes You"), and five stuffed animal mascots used to portray Beijing and China as harmonious and cordial.

== Books ==
John Grisham's book The Appeal is about a multimillion-dollar suit against a chemical company in Mississippi that dumped harmful chemicals in the water supply to save money. The chemical company tries to pay off a Supreme Court justice to get out of any punitive monetary damages or civil charges. Grisham gives details in his book about one of the executives for the chemical company hiring a "government relations" firm in order to get a political stance on their issue and turn the company's image around.

David Baldacci's book, The Whole Truth, involves a shady perception management firm that creates an anti-Russia campaign for one of the largest international arms dealers. This perception management company "employs various strategies at a grassroots YouTube level, as well as selectively leaking information to the corporate media, that seek to blame Russia for a host of terrible atrocities." The main character's fiancé is killed because she starts to suspect foul play with all of the anti-Russia campaigning.

== Movies ==
People in the movie industry can also use perception management through the movies they choose to make. One movie, The Day After Tomorrow, changed many people's minds in a study comparing watchers and non-watchers views on global warming. The study, conducted by Anthony Leiserowitz, asked both groups how concerned they were about global warming, and 83 percent of watchers said they were very concerned compared to 72 percent of non-watchers. They also asked the watchers whether the movie made them less or more worried about global warming and 49 percent said they were more worried after seeing the movie.

Perception management is also important in the movie industry in terms of celebrity image. For example, much of the controversy over the 2010 Oscar-winning Black Swan centers around the fact that Natalie Portman is said to have danced for most of the movie. However, her double, Sarah Lane, claims that the majority of the dancing was done by herself. When she mentioned this in interviews, Lane noted that she was quickly told to keep quiet. The movies' producers were worried that this information would reflect negatively on Portman and affect her chances of winning an Oscar. Lane noted in an interview with Glamour that "They were trying to create this image, this facade, really, that Natalie had done something extraordinary. Something that is pretty much impossible ... to become a professional ballerina in a year and half" (Katrandjian 1).

== Environment ==
In 2010, the Canadian government was accused of "hiding the truth" of global warming and cutting much needed funds to research and development programs. Graham Saul of Climate Action Network of Canada said, "This government says they take climate change seriously but they do nothing and try to hide the truth about climate change." The Guardian stated that 300,000 people die each year and 125 billion dollars are lost a year to gradual climate change caused by global warming. However, internal government documents showed that media coverage regarding global warming had been cut by 80 percent, and strict rules and regulations blocked scientists from talking to reporters.

Several science research bases across Canada ran out of government funding and were forced to shut down. Funding for the Canadian Foundation for Climate and Atmosphere Sciences, which researched the melting of polar ice and frequency of Arctic storms, was also drying up. Many climatology researchers across the globe believed that Canada is falling behind in climate science and because of this the world is not getting any information about what is happening in the Canadian Arctic. The Canadian government has admitted to eliminating government-funded climate research so there won't be any "bad news" about what is happening.

== Social networking ==
Social networking currently provides more information and features than original function of allowing individuals to connect with their peers. Social networking sites have a large amount of data and records from billions of people, and construct recommendations used by enterprises, small business, and individuals. For example, Facebook has a recommendation system that allows users to indicate what "news articles, companies and celebrities they 'like'" and "shares data about those preferences with its Web partners", so "when a Facebook user visits a Web site like Yelp or TripAdvisor, they are shown reviews from friends before they get to those from strangers."

Companies also use social networking to investigate candidates and employees. The results obtained from a potential employee's immediate social network are often more relevant, significant, and factual than what the candidate presents about themselves during an interview. Therefore, it is necessary to manage how one wants to be perceived on one's social network.

== See also ==
- Alhurra, a satellite TV channel sponsored by the U.S. government
- Customer relationship management
- Manufacturing Consent: The Political Economy of the Mass Media
- Opposition research
- Psychological warfare, sometimes known as Psy Ops
- Smith–Mundt Act
- Spin (propaganda)
- Reflexive control
