= Carleone's Vintage =

Vintage

Studio album by Young Bleed
- Released: July 30, 2002
- Recorded: 2001–2002
- Genre: Gangsta rap, Southern hip hop
- Length: 62:16
- Label: Da'Tention Home Ent.

Young Bleed chronology
My Own (1999)	Vintage (2002)	Rise Thru da Ranks from Earner Tugh Capo (2005)

Vintage is the third studio album from rapper Young Bleed, released under the name Young Bleed Carleone's. His next album Rise Thru da Ranks from Earner Tugh Capo was released under the name Young Bleed.

== Track listing ==
No.	Title	Length
1.	"Born Kings"	5:10
2.	"Tribal X' Istence"	3:22
3.	"Kisses N' Hugs"	6:23
4.	"Da Don"	4:56
5.	"Murderous"	11:20
6.	"Da' Indo' Mission"	1:03
7.	"Out Dat' Dirty"	5:32
8.	"Bleed N' Tyme"	5:22
9.	"Whatchall' Mean"	6:21
10.	"N' Dis' World"	3:14
11.	"Take It E' Zeh'"	4:20
12.	"Out Da' Windo'"	5:19
