= Once Upon a Time in Amedica =

Studio album by Young Bleed
- Released: September 11, 2007
- Recorded: 2006–2007
- Genre: Gangsta rap
- Label: West Coast Mafia Records
- Producer: C-Bo, Roy Jones Jr., Timmy Fingerz, Chris Godbey

Young Bleed chronology
Rise Thru da Ranks from Earner Tugh Capo (2005)	Once Upon a Time in Amedica (2007)	Preserved (2011)

Professional ratings
Review scores
Source	Rating
RapReviews	(7.5/10)

Once Upon a Time in Amedica is the fifth album released by rapper, Young Bleed. It was released on September 11, 2007 for West Coast Mafia Records and was executively produced by C-Bo and Roy Jones Jr., with additional production by Timmy Fingerz and Chris Godbey. Once Upon a Time in Amedica did rather well compared to his previous album, peaking at #48 on the Top R&B/Hip-Hop Albums and #25 on the Rap Albums charts.

== Track listing ==
1. "Bac Road Mississippi"- 5:10 (Featuring Money Waters & Ol' Mann)
2. "U' Kno' Meh'"- 3:25
3. "Top Back"- 4:07 (Featuring 8Ball)
4. "Doin' Me!"- 4:46 (Featuring Rich Boy)
5. "Sound Uh Da' City"- 3:58
6. "Arch' Criminal"- 4:15
7. "Shake Sump'n' Fa' Meh'- 3:39 (Featuring Choppa)
8. "Bounce It"- 4:03 (Featuring Juvenile)
9. "N' Da' Street"- 4:56
10. "Tumble' N' Down"- 4:39
11. "People!"- 5:15
12. "Gangstas' & Ballas"- 4:19 (Featuring C-Bo)
13. "Musik N' Money"- 3:03 (Featuring David Banner)
14. "Tear Dis' M-F Up!"- 5:02 (Featuring Blazzak Mann)
15. "Life Ain't Change"- 4:52 (Featuring Trae)
16. "Ona' Low"- 3:18
17. "Tear It Down"- 4:07 (Featuring Ol' Mann & Loaded)
