= Kollaborationz =

Studio album by Mr. Envi'
- Released: November 27, 2012
- Recorded: 2012
- Genre: Southern hip hop
- Length: 31:46
- Label: Southern Stisles Records
- Producer: Mr. Envi', JTL

Mr. Envi' chronology
Rydaz Redemption (2011)	Kollaborationz (2012)	Point of No Return (2013)

Kollaborationz. is the second independent album by rapper Mr. Envi'. It was released on November 27, 2012.

== Track listing ==
1. Pretendas (featuring JTL) — 3:20
2. What They Want (featuring J.B. & JTL) — 3:01
3. Don't Wait (featuring JTL) — 3:30
4. Show Ya Money (featuring JTL) — 2:28
5. Let It Be Known (featuring JTL & Blade) — 3:50
6. Just Chill (featuring JTL, CornBread & J.B.) — 3:25
7. Close Ya Mouth (featuring Mista Bush) — 3:25
8. Keep It Poppin' (featuring S.G.) — 4:16
9. What They Want (REMIX) (featuring JTL, J.B., CornBread & S.G.) — 4:31
