= Recap =

Recap may refer to:

- Retread a resurfaced tire
- Clip show, a TV episode recapping the story and reusing old footage
- Recap sequence
- Dividend recapitalization
- RECAP, archiving software for United States court documents
- The Recap album

== See also ==
- Summary (disambiguation)
