= Preserved (album) =

Studio album by Young Bleed
- Released: October 11, 2011
- Recorded: 2011
- Genre: Gangsta rap
- Length: 75:45
- Label: Strange Lane Records, RBC Records, Fontana Distribution
- Producer: Dave Peters, Keith Clizark, Kevin Lamar Mitchell, Seven, Sweathogg

Young Bleed chronology
Once Upon a Time in Amedica (2007)	Preserved (2011)	Country Boy Livin' (2014)

Preserved is the sixth album by Young Bleed. It was released on October 11, 2011, under Strange Lane Records.

Professional ratings
Review scores
Source	Rating
Pitchfork Media	(7.9/10)

== Track listing ==
No.	Title	Producer(s)	Length
1.	"Stamp On It"	Dave Peters	4:10
2.	"Boot Up" (featuring Juvenile)	Kevin Lamar Mitchell	4:10
3.	"It's Nut'n"	Keith Clizark	3:23
4.	"Holla' At Uh' Dog"	Sweathogg	3:31
5.	"Hurt Nobody" (featuring Destiny D'Lere Clifton)	Seven	3:14
6.	"Husle' Ball"	Seven	4:54
7.	"Wut'z Up"	Seven	4:07
8.	"From da' City"	Seven	4:44
9.	"Wall Uh' Fame"	Seven	4:03
10.	"How Ya' Do Dat' Again" (featuring Brotha Lynch Hung and Tech N9ne)	Seven	3:57
11.	"Uh' Gangsta's Gangsta"	Sweathogg	4:49
12.	"It'll Go Down"	Sweathogg	4:34
13.	"M.O.E. (Money Over Everything)"	Sweathogg	3:19
14.	"Call the Police"		4:11
15.	"City Uh' God"	Keith Clizark	3:21
16.	"Walk Like Uh' Husala'"	Sweathogg	5:04
17.	"Pāpă Pāpă" (featuring Lil' Witness)	Sweathogg	5:03
18.	"Thank 'Ya" (featuring Chantele Crowder)	Sweathogg	5:12
Total length:			75:45
