= The Whole Truth (novel) =

2008 novel by David Baldacci

- Hardcover edition
- Author: David Baldacci
- Language: English
- Series: Shaw and Katie James
- Genre: Political thriller
- Publisher: Grand Central Publishing
- Publication date: April 22, 2008
- Publication place: United States
- Media type: Print (hardback & paperback)
- Pages: 406 pp (first edition, hardback)
- ISBN: 0-446-19597-9 (first edition, hardback)
- OCLC: 184829443
- Dewey Decimal: 813/.54 22
- LC Class: PS3552.A446 W48 2008
- Followed by: Deliver Us From Evil

The Whole Truth is a political thriller novel written by David Baldacci. This is the first book to feature A. Shaw and Katie James. The book was initially published on April 22, 2008, by Grand Central Publishing.

== See also ==
- Mutually assured destruction
- Perception management
