= Doyle Wolfgang von Frankenstein =

American guitarist (born 1964)

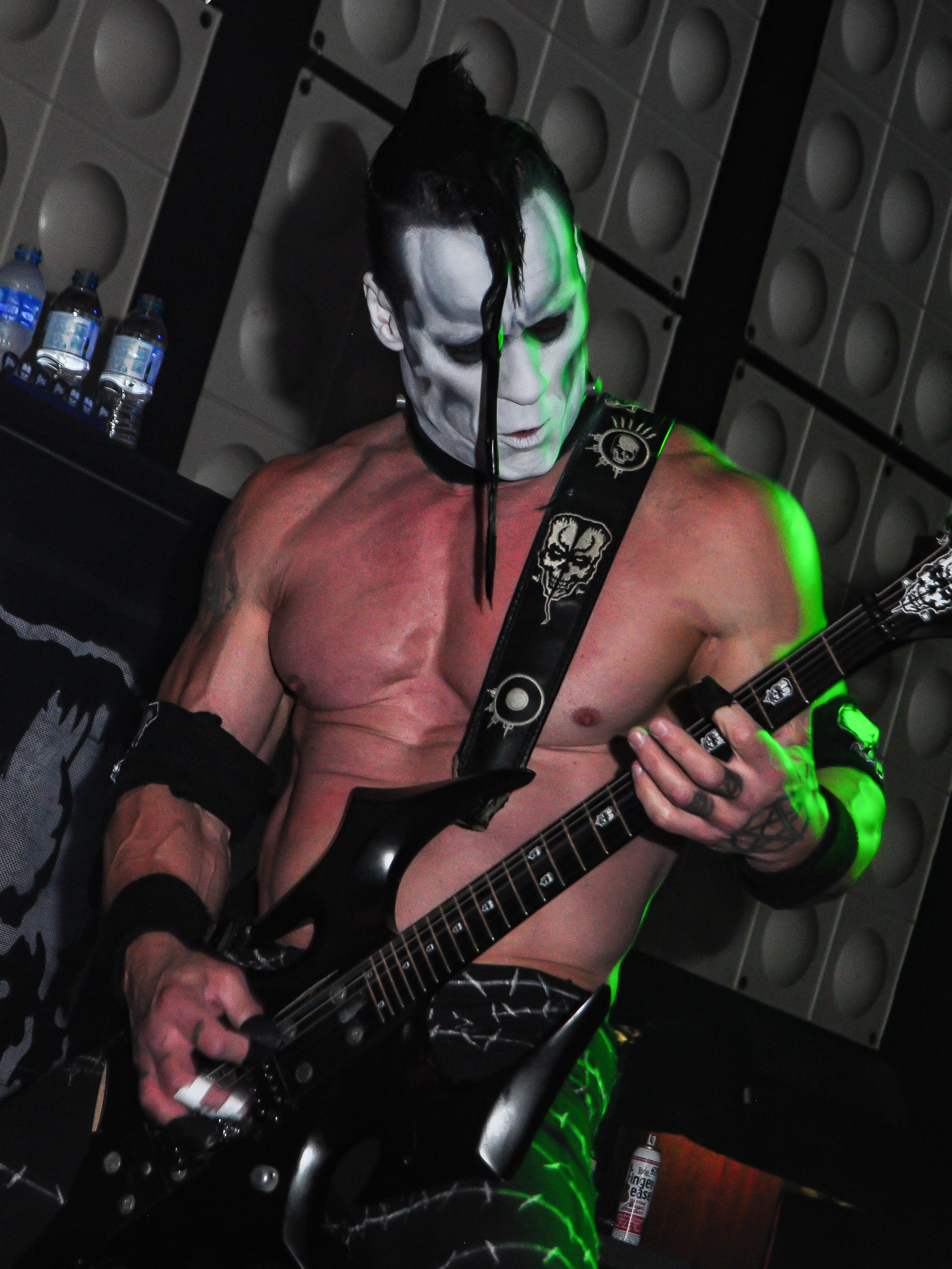
- Doyle performing in 2018

Background information
- Born: Paul Caiafa; September 15, 1964 (age 62); Lodi, New Jersey, U.S.
- Genres: Hardcore punk; heavy metal; horror punk
- Occupations: Musician; songwriter
- Instrument: Guitar
- Years active: 1980–present
- Member of: The Misfits; Doyle
- Formerly of: Gorgeous Frankenstein

Paul Caiafa (born September 15, 1964), known professionally as Doyle Wolfgang von Frankenstein, is an American guitarist best known for his material with the horror punk band the Misfits and his own self-named band named Doyle.

== Early life ==
Raised in Lodi, New Jersey, growing up Caiafa would regularly watch horror shows and movies such as The Munsters, The Addams Family and The Twilight Zone which eventually drew him to horror rock. He started attending Lodi High School two years following his brother Jerry's graduation. He played on the school's football team for all four years and graduated in 1982.

== Career ==
=== 1980–1983: Misfits (Glenn Danzig era) guitarist ===
Doyle, the younger brother of the Misfits bassist, Jerry Only, was originally a roadie for the band and was taught how to play guitar by lead vocalist Glenn Danzig and Jerry. He joined the Misfits in October 1980 at the age of 16. Doyle was the band's third guitarist, replacing Bobby Steele after Steele failed to show up to a recording session. Jerry and Doyle financed the band by working at their father's machine shop.

Like Glenn and Jerry, Doyle incorporated the devilock into his image.

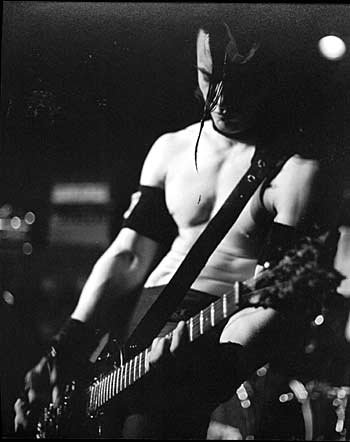
Doyle in 1982

=== 1987–1989: Kryst the Conqueror ===
In 1987, four years after the dissolution of the Misfits, Doyle and Jerry formed the metal band Kryst The Conqueror with drummer The Murp. Select songs from the album were released by Jerry Only's record label "Cyclopian Music" as an EP, and featured guest guitarist Dave "The Snake" Sabo of the rock band Skid Row.

=== 1995–2000: Misfits guitarist ===
In 1995 Jerry Only settled a legal battle out of court with co-founder Glenn Danzig, effectively allowing Only the rights to the band's name on a performing level.

Doyle and Jerry reformed the Misfits in 1995, with Jerry acting as the band's figurehead and with Michale Graves as vocalist and Dr. Chud as drummer. The group released two full-length albums of new material. Graves and Chud left the band in 2000, in reaction to the loss of members, Doyle left the Misfits.

=== 2000s: Touring with Danzig and forming Gorgeous Frankenstein ===
In 2005, Doyle left New Jersey for Las Vegas and began auditioning members for his own band, Gorgeous Frankenstein alongside his then wife Stephanie Bellars.

The same year, he appeared on stage with Danzig numerous times throughout Danzig's Blackest of the Black tour. The two also performed three special Misfits sets in the East Coast. They would meet again in 2007, when Gorgeous Frankenstein played their first tour, opening for Danzig. This line up included Argyle Goolsby of Blitzkid, Dr. Chud and Gorgeous George. Doyle has since joined them on several occasions to play 30-minute-long sets of classic Misfits songs.

During the latter quarter of 2011, former vocalist Danzig and guitarist Doyle performed Misfits songs on four occasions as part of the "Danzig Legacy" tour. The first of the four shows, which took place on October 7 in Chicago as one of the headlining acts at Riot Fest, saw a sold-out crowd of 5,000+. The last true "Legacy" show took place on Halloween at the Gibson Amphitheater in Los Angeles with an over sold crowd of 7,000+.

In 2012, "Danzig and Doyle" headlined several worldwide Festivals and did around 70+ shows together. Danzig would play his set before Doyle would join him onstage to perform a set of Misfits songs. He would also join Danzig on his 25th anniversary tour in 2013, to play Misfits sets.

=== 2013–present: Solo act ===
The year 2013 saw the inception of Doyle's solo effort, eponymously named "Doyle". The band features Alex Story of Cancerslug on vocals, Dr. Chud of the second-era Misfits on drums, and "Left Hand" Graham on bass.

The debut album, Abominator, was released digitally through INgrooves/Fontana Distribution on July 30, 2013, through iTunes, Google Play, and other streaming services like Deezer. It was distributed by Altavoz (USA), Nippon Columbia (Japan) and Cargo Records (Europe).

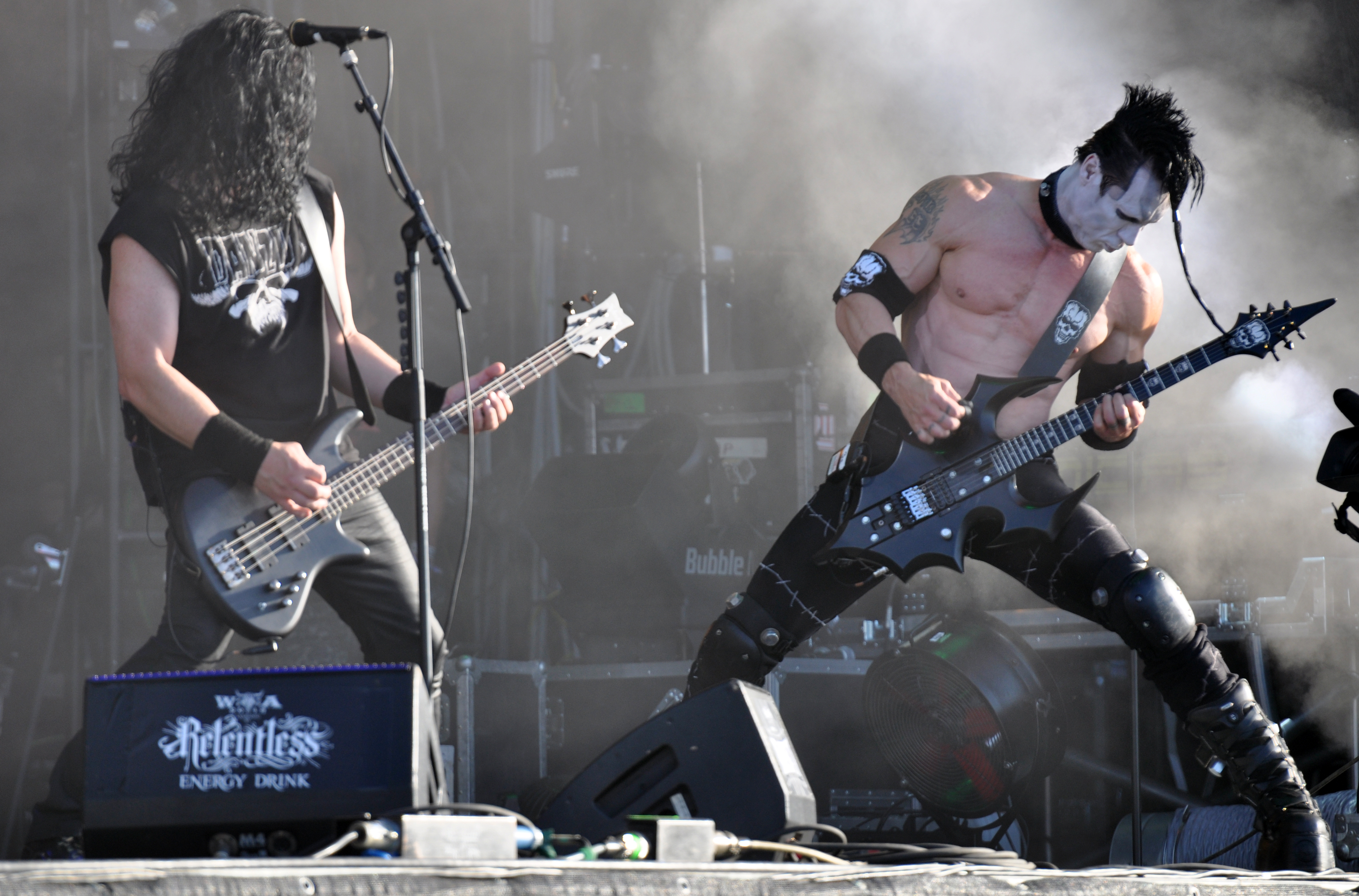
Doyle with Steve Zing (Danzig) in 2013

The album was independently produced and released by Doyle's own Monsterman Records. The official CD release was in October 2013 in major retailers such as Best Buy and FYE. There is an "advance copy" that was sold at shows on the Danzig "Legacy Tour", as well as from Doyle's official website. This pre-released advance is lacking a 13th track, released on the final cut, entitled "Drawing Down The Moon".

In May 2014, Doyle announced he was teaming up with Alan Robert, bassist of Life of Agony, for a special Halloween 2014 issue of Robert's award-winning Killogy comic series. Robert said that this was a continuation of his original Killogy comic series but issue will surround Doyle's character. The issue will be published by IDW Publishing.

Doyle set out on the 2015 "Abominator Tour" in March, hitting the road as an opening act for Mushroomhead through April, with headlining dates continuing after into May. Dr. Chud left the band shortly before the band's first tour "Annihilate America" in 2014, and was replaced by Anthony "Tiny" Biuso midway through the 2015 tour. Shortly after, "Tiny" stated that he would no longer be playing with the band and would not continue on the remainder of the tour. A replacement was found immediately: Brandon Pertzborn, the latest tour drummer of Black Flag. "Left Hand" Graham was replaced for the 2015 tour and the band featured DieTrich Thrall on bass instead.

In May 2017, Doyle’s second studio album Doyle II: As We Die was released. Doyle toured in support of the album through 2017 and 2018.

Doyle was scheduled to tour alongside Life of Agony in 2020, however it was cancelled due to the Covid-19 pandemic. Doyle returned to tour in 2022, embarking on the "Abominate the World as We Die" tour in the Spring of that year. In Spring 2024, Doyle once again embarked on another US headling tour.

In 2022, Doyle founded his own line of guitar gear called Von Frankenstein Monster Gear. The company was originally started to create electric guitar strings that could endure his playing style throughout live shows, but it has since began selling other products.

In 2025, Doyle was inducted into The Metal Hall of Fame as a solo artist.

=== 2016–present: Misfits reunion ===
On May 12, 2016, it was announced that Glenn Danzig, Jerry Only, and Doyle would perform together as "The Original Misfits" for the first time in 33 years. They reunited for two headlining shows in September 2016 at the Riot Fest in Chicago and Denver. In December 2017, the reunited lineup performed two concerts at the MGM Grand Garden Arena in Las Vegas and The Forum in Inglewood, California. In 2018, the band played at the Prudential Center in Newark, New Jersey and in 2019 at the Allstate Arena in suburban Chicago. The group played more shows together in 2021 and 2022, most recently they played at Coachella in 2025.

== Playing style and equipment ==
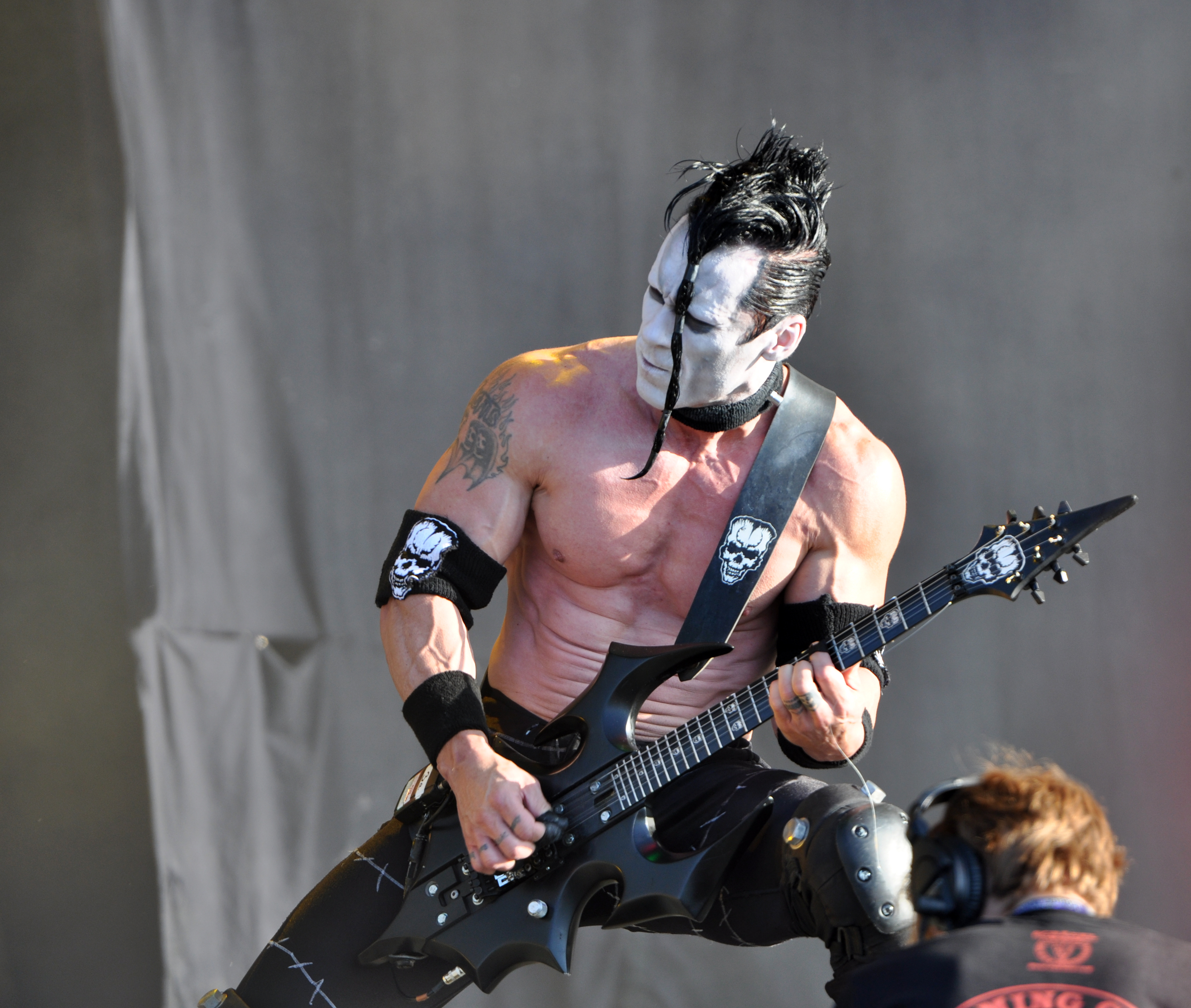
Doyle with Danzig at Wacken Open Air 2013 with his custom-made "Annihilator" guitar

Doyle's guitar playing style consists heavily of downstrokes and power chords. He admits to limited facility on guitar, believing "great songs" are more important than instrumental skill in achieving professional success. New Noise wrote that his style is "a mesmerizing mix of intense punk riffs and hammering, almost flailing, power chords." Metallica guitarist and vocalist James Hetfield has cited Doyle as an influence specifically for his down picking abilities.

His influences include Tony Iommi, Eddie Van Halen, John 5, Michael Amott, Dimebag Darrell, Ace Frehley, Joe Perry, Jimmy Page, Mick Ronson, Johnny Ramone and Steve Jones.

Early on in Doyle's career, he used an Ibanez Iceman guitar. However, after experimenting with guitars in Kryst the Conqueror, Doyle developed his custom-made "Annihilator" guitar using his experience as a machinist to design and build the guitar himself. The bat shape was inspired by his love of Batman. These guitars have neck-through design with a graphite body and are loaded with a Seymour Duncan Invader pickup, and are strung with Dean Markley strings. The guitar was made without external screws on the body, as guitars with external screws scratched and cut his skin when he played shirtless.

In the 2000s, Doyle collaborated with October Guitars (now spelled "Oktober") to recreate the "Annihilator" with a signature pickup. Despite this, Doyle still uses his own Annihilator because Oktober were not able to make them the exact way that he preferred. In February 2022, he collaborated with Dean Guitars on a signature Annihilator guitar that will come loaded with his signature Sheptone pickup. The guitar more or less comes with the exact same specs as original but with custom fret markers that show music notes instead of the traditional white dots. It is priced at US$9,999.

Since the mid-1990s he has used a Demeter TGP-3 rack preamp that feeds an Ampeg SVT bass head. His speaker cabinets are his own design, and have Celestion speakers. His pedalboard has a TC Electronic Chorus/Flanger, an MXR Micro Flanger, Digitech Whammy IV pedal, a Morley Bad Horsie 2 wah, an Ampeg Scrambler, a Vox Time Machine delay. In his amp rack, there is an ISP Decimator, and a Digitech Valve Distortion, Plus Line 6 G50 wireless systems.

== Film and television appearances ==
Following Doyle and his brother Jerry Only resolving legal disputes with Glenn Danzig over using the Misfits name and logo in 1995, the duo began making appearances in small budget films along with doing work on ESPN's X-Game. On November 1, 1997, Doyle and Only appeared on an episode on WCW Monday Nitro to help Vampiro win his match. Doyle and his brother would appear on a few more televised events for the company however they would be let go soon after following Only’s attempt to unionize the wrestlers. In 2017, it was announced he would be cast in the Death Ward 13 remake however the film has yet to be released.

== Personal life ==
Doyle married Stephanie Bellars in 2001. The two met during Doyle’s brevity stint in WCW, Bellars was dating Randy Savage at the time. The couple have one daughter. He has three sons from previous relationships. The couple has since divorced, which was finalized in 2013.

Since 2013, Doyle has been in a domestic partnership with Alissa White-Gluz, former vocalist of the Swedish melodic death metal band Arch Enemy. The couple are vegan. Doyle launched an animal-free hot sauce in 2008, and has been a public advocate for PETA in the past along with being nominated for their Hottest Vegan Award in 2017.

Doyle is a bodybuilder and first began working out when he was 10 years old. He has stated he only misses working out if he has business to take care of or if he is hurt. He is sponsored by the fitness company PowerBlock Dumbells who send him equipment which he brings with him on tours.

== Discography ==
=== Misfits ===
- Walk Among Us (1982)
- Evilive (1982)
- Earth A.D./Wolfs Blood (1983)
- American Psycho (1997)
- Evillive II (1998) – live album
- Famous Monsters (1999)
- Cuts from the Crypt (2001) – compilation album

=== Kryst the Conqueror ===
- Deliver Us from Evil (1989)

=== Gorgeous Frankenstein ===
- Gorgeous Frankenstein (2007)

=== Doyle ===
- Abominator (2013)
- Doyle II: As We Die (2017)

=== Video ===
- You Must See It to Believe It (2010) (Gorgeous Frankenstein DVD)
