= Point of No Return (Mr. Envi' EP) =

EP by Mr. Envi'
- Released: March 19, 2013
- Recorded: 2012
- Genre: Southern hip hop
- Length: 15:44
- Label: Southern Stisles Records
- Producer: MistaTBeatz, Fuol

Mr. Envi' chronology
| Kollaborationz (2012) | Point of No Return (2013) | The Recap (2014) |

Point of No Return EP is the first EP by rapper Mr. Envi'. It was released on March 19, 2013.

== Track listing ==
1. Point of No Return Intro — 1:31
2. Where U From (featuring JB) — 3:05
3. Re Up — 3:17
4. Skit — :45
5. Back It Off (featuring Jeramie) — 3:00
6. Laura (featuring MD) — 3:05
7. Outro — 1:00
