= Mr. Envi' =

American rapper

- Born: Holland Dai'mon Witherspoon
- Origin: Uniontown, Alabama, U.S.
- Genres: Hip hop
- Occupations: Record producer, rapper
- Years active: 2003-present
- Labels: Southern Stisles (current); Mia Mind; Tate Music Group (former)
- Website: mrenvi1.com

Holland Dai'mon Witherspoon, also known as Mr. Envi', is an American rapper based out of Bossier City, Louisiana. He is the owner of Southern Stisles Records and Hood Critic Magazine and is now the founder of the North Louisiana Football Alliance, a minor developmental football league where he currently serves as the league president.

== Career ==
In 2001, Mr. Envi' started releasing mixtapes locally catching the attention of a local radio personality at 107.5FM in Uniontown, Alabama, where he's originally from. This soon led him to his first single "Break His Jaw", to be aired on local radio. Shortly after, he moved to Louisiana where he felt he'd have a better opportunity to break out nationally.

Mr. Envi' released his first album "Rydaz Redemption" in 2011. The album debuted at #3 on the CMJ National Hip Hop Add Charts. Rydaz Redemption was later followed by two EP's, "Kollaborationz" in 2012 and "Point of No Return" in 2013. He went on to sign a non-exclusive distribution deal with Oklahoma-based Tate Music Group, releasing one album entitled "The Recap" in 2014.

In 2015, he partnered with the New Jersey–based marketing company Mia Mind Music to release "Damage Kontrol". The album was distributed by Select-O-Hits and featured guest appearances from Young Bleed, La Chat and more. "Damage Kontrol" was released on August 14, 2015, with a promotional tour to follow the release. Later that year, Mr. Envi' received word that he had been nominated in three categories for the 2016 SCM Awards, held in Memphis, Tennessee.

While touring consistently between 2015 and 2016, Mr. Envi' began recording for his upcoming EP series. The series consisted of two parts; "Evryday Hustle" being the first, was released May 27, 2016, and "All Nite Grind" the second. Originally intended to be released around mid September 2016, "All Nite Grind" was rescheduled for an early 2017 release.

Over the years, Mr. Envi' has either shared a stage or worked with many notable artist such as Juvenile, Young Bleed, La Chat, Shawnna, Chalie Boy and Crooked I, among others.

== Southern Stisles Records ==
Southern Stisles Records
- Founded: 2001
- Founder: Mr. Envi' (CEO)
- Distributors: Symphonic Distribution (current); Altavoz (former)
- Genre: Hip-hop, R&B, rap, pop
- Country of origin: United States
- Location: Bossier City, Louisiana
- Official website: southernstislesrecords.com

Southern Stisles Records is a Louisiana-based independent record label specializing in hip-hop. It was founded by Holland (Mr. Envi') Witherspoon in 2001.

=== Current artists ===
- Mr. Envi' (founder/CEO)
- Delicate Marie
- Bigg Redd
- DJ Certified 318 (Tour DJ)

== Discography ==
=== Independent albums ===
- Rydaz Redemption – 2011
- Kollaborationz – 2012
- Damage Kontrol – 2015

=== EPs ===
- Point of No Return – 2013
- Evryday Hustle – 2016
- All Nite Grind – 2017
- Tha 40oz – 2018

=== Compilations ===
- The Recap – 2014
- The Recap II – 2017

=== Mixtapes ===
- Tantrum – 2004
- From Tha Top To Bottom Vol. 1 – 2009
- From Tha Top To Bottom Vol. 2 – 2010
- From Tha Top To Bottom Vol. 3 – 2011
- Affiliationz Vol. 1 – 2011
- From Tha Top To Bottom Vol. 4 – 2012
