= Kryst the Conqueror =

American Christian metal band

- Origin: Lodi, New Jersey, United States
- Genres: Christian metal; heavy metal; power metal
- Years active: 1987–1995
- Label: Cyclopean Music Inc.
- Members: Jerry Only; Doyle Wolfgang von Frankenstein; Jeff Scott Soto; Dr. Chud; The Murp

Kryst the Conqueror (pronounced "Christ") was an American Christian metal project formed in August 1987 by two former members of the horror punk band, The Misfits. The project was led by bassist Jerry Only, who adopted a new stage name, "Mo the Great" (or alternately, "Mocavious Kryst"), and his younger brother, guitarist Doyle Wolfgang von Frankenstein. The band fused fantastical and sci-fi imagery with religious themes and messages. The band has also been referred to as a "guitar shop project", as Only and Doyle constantly tweaked and refined their instruments throughout the band's existence, in an attempt to create what they felt would be the ultimate bass and guitar.

== History ==
In 1988, they formed The Doyle Fan Club in order to promote the new project and stay in touch with fans of The Misfits. According to various interviews conducted at the time, and a series of fan club letters written by Jerry Only (as "Mo The Great") from 1988 to 1990, Kryst the Conqueror was meant to be Only's vision of the "perfect" band. He hoped the "righteous" message of the band would reach out to fans, especially those who had followed former Misfits frontman, Glenn Danzig's post-Misfits career with the bands Samhain and Danzig – bands which Jerry felt were satanic, evil and possibly damaging to impressionable youths.

A full album, Deliver Us From Evil, was recorded, although it has never been officially released in its entirety. Instead, five of the album's tracks were released in 1990 as an EP for a special Christmas package. The band never had an official lead singer, although noted Yngwie Malmsteen vocalist, Jeff Scott Soto, was hired to record vocals for the album. Although it has been rumoured for many years that Soto was under contract with Malmsteen this is in fact untrue. Soto set the record straight in an interview about his time recording the vocals for their debut in March 2015, he was billed on the EP as "Kryst the Conqueror"). Also, Dave "The Snake" Sabo did a guest guitar solo on the song "Spellbound."

Though the band never played live, Kryst the Conqueror survived as a non-active band until 1995, at which time Jerry and Doyle reached an out of court settlement with Glenn Danzig, granting them the rights to perform as The Misfits. Kryst the Conqueror was then quickly revamped into what would become the second incarnation of The Misfits. Some Kryst the Conqueror songs were eventually re-written into songs for the "resurrected" Misfits.

== Members ==
- Jeff Scott "Kryst the Conqueror" Soto – lead vocals
- Doyle Wolfgang von Frankenstein – guitars
- Jerry "Mo the Great" Only – bass
- The Murp – drums (1987–1992)
- Dr. Chud – drums (1992–1995)

== Discography ==
- Deliver Us From Evil EP (1989)
- Deliver Us From Evil (unreleased)
