= Syke Pachino =

- Also known as: Syko-Rah
- Born: Philip Syke Pachino Jason Mojica; March 6, 1978; Leominster, Massachusetts, United States
- Origin: Columbus, Georgia, United States
- Died: July 11, 2017 Columbus, Georgia
- Genre: Hip hop
- Occupations: musician, producer, rapper, writer and mixer.
- Years active: 2000–2017
- Labels: Ear Hustlin' Entertainment (Current); Seagram Records; Flipn Flava Records (Former); Def For Life Records (Former)

Philip Jason Mojica (March 6, 1978 – July 11, 2017), better known as Syke Pachino (formerly Syko-Rah), was a Spanish-American hip-hop artist based out of Columbus, Georgia.

== Early life ==
Mojica was born on March 6,1978, in Leominster, Massachusetts, to Parents of Felipe and Zonia Mojica. Mojica has one sibling a sister named April Whitaker and has a son named Jaydon Mojica.Originally from Leominster, Massachusetts, Syke Pachino eventually moved to Columbus, Georgia, where he spent most of his life and would go on to begin his career in music. Mojica went to George Washington Carver High School in Columbus, Georgia.

== Career ==
In 2001 Syke signed his first recording contract with Flipn Flava Records, where he released his debut album titled "Georgiarican" under the name "Syko-Rah" and was supported by the single "Darkmoom Setting" which featured a guest appearance from former American Idol semi-finalist, Christopher Aaron. Shortly after the release, Syke went on an eight-year hiatus due to complications with the label and his personal life.

Also during this time, he linked up with Brett Life, a producer from Columbus, Ga and released the Def For Life Records' debut "The Rebirth" and recorded songs for the unreleased album, "Life Music".

In 2008, he decided to leave Flipn Flava and re-invent himself, recording under the name "Syke Pachino". A year after his departure, a second project "Political Prisoner" was released as a means to fulfill his contract.

During the later part of 2009, Syke linked up with Seagram Records (named after the slain Oakland rapper Seagram) to begin working on his next project. As a result, he released his third album "Live By The Code" in 2011.

Syke went on to be nominated for "Hip Hip Male Artist of the Year" at the 2012 GA Music Awards, held in Atlanta, Georgia.

Over the years Syke has worked with many notable artist such as Scarface, Bun B, Spice 1 and Bohagon just to name a few.

Syke has also been featured on tour alongside Young Bleed, Mr. Envi', Chucky Workclothes and others consecutively for the past two years, prepping for the upcoming "Hard Work Pays Off Tour", scheduled to start on April 28. His next release titled "Only Time Will Tell" is scheduled to be released early fall 2017, under his own label, Ear Hustlin' Entertainment.

He died on July 11, 2017, In Columbus, Georgia. No cause of death was released.

== Discography ==
=== Studio albums ===
- Georgiarican (as Syko-Rah) - 2001
- Political Prisoner (as Syko-Rah) - 2004
- The Rebirth (as Syko-Rah) - 2005
- Life Music (Unreleased) (as Syko-Rah) - 2005
- Political Prisoner (2nd Issue) (as Syko-Rah) - 2009
- Live By The Code - 2011
- Only Time Will Tell - 2017

=== Mixtapes ===
- The Vault (Bootlegs & G-Sides) - 2017
