= Summary =

Summary may refer to:

- Abstract (summary), shortening a passage or a write-up without changing its meaning but by using different words and sentences
- Epitome, a summary or miniature form
- Abridgement, the act of reducing a written work into a shorter form
- Summary or executive summary of a document, a short document or section that summarizes a longer document such as a report or proposal or a group of related reports
- Introduction (writing)
- Summary (law), which has several meanings in law
- Automatic summarization, the use of a computer program to produce an abstract or abridgement

== See also ==
- Overview (disambiguation)
- Recap (disambiguation)
- Synopsis (disambiguation)
