= Deliver Us from Evil (Kryst the Conqueror album) =

EP by Kryst the Conqueror
- Released: January 13, 1990
- Genre: Heavy metal
- Length: 24:42
- Label: Cyclopean Music Inc.

Deliver Us from Evil is an EP by Kryst the Conqueror, an American Christian metal group. It was released on January 13, 1990, on Cyclopean Music Inc.

== Track listing ==
All tracks are written by Jerry Only and Doyle Wolfgang von Frankstein.

1. "Thunder Thruster" – 3:57
2. "In God We Trust" – 5:01
3. "Trial of the Soul" – 3:50
4. "March of the Mega-Mites" – 6:19
5. "Spellbound" – 5:35

== Credits ==
=== Band ===
- Jeff Scott "Kryst the Conqueror" Soto – lead vocals
- Doyle Wolfgang von Frankenstein – guitar
- Jerry "Mo the Great" Only – bass
- The Murp – drums

=== Guest musician ===
- Dave Sabo – guitar solo on "Trial of the Soul"

== Album ==
Deliver Us from Evil was also the name of an unreleased album by Kryst the Conqueror. Thirteen songs were recorded for it, but the only songs that were produced were the ones that appeared on the above EP. Kryst the Conqueror was later revamped into the newly reformed Misfits, and at the first recording session the band re-recorded "Dr. Phibes Rises Again", although it was not released until 2001 on the rarities album Cuts from the Crypt. The full album was eventually leaked online.

=== Track listing ===
1. "Kryst the Conqueror"
2. "Thunder Thruster"
3. "Wherever I Roam"
4. "Valhalla"
5. "Soldiers of Light"
6. "Spellbound"
7. "In God We Trust"
8. "Night Raiders"
9. "The Highlander"
10. "In My Dreams"
11. "March of the Mega-Mites"
12. "Trial of the Soul"
13. "Dr. Phibes Rises Again"
