= Deliver Us from Evil (novel) =

2010 thriller by David Baldacci

Deliver Us From Evil
- Hardcover edition
- Author: David Baldacci
- Language: English
- Series: Shaw and Katie James
- Genre: Thriller novel
- Publisher: Grand Central Publishing
- Publication date: April 20, 2010
- Publication place: United States
- Media type: Print; e-book; audiobook
- Pages: 416 (hardcover)
- ISBN: 978-0-446-56408-3
- Preceded by: The Whole Truth

Deliver Us From Evil is a thriller novel written by David Baldacci. This is the second installment in the book series featuring A. Shaw and Katie James. The book was initially published on April 20, 2010, by Grand Central Publishing.
