= Lady Cam =

American rapper

- Born: Camille Louise Blouin; August 13, 1987 (age 38)
- Origin: Dallas, Texas, United States
- Genres: Hip hop
- Occupations: Rapper, actress
- Years active: 2005–present
- Labels: Cam Recordings (Current); Southern Stisles Records; 101 Distribution (Former)
- Website: Official Website

Camille Louise Blouin, better known by her stage name Lady Cam, is an American rapper, model and actress. Lady Cam is from Dallas, Texas.

== Career ==
Over the years Lady Cam has been published in both online and print magazines and has appeared on the cover of Hood Critic and others. Lady Cam has opened for acts such as Juvenile of Cash Money, Shawnna formerly of DTP, Webbie, Cupied, Lil' Flip, Lil Cali and Foxx.

Lady Cam won an award for "Best Female rapper" at the On the Grind Magazine awards, held in Florida.

== Acting ==
Lady Cam took a shot at acting in the late 2000s. She is credited for her roles in Beautiful Creatures (2013), Blues for Life (2016) and Mississippi Turntup (2017).

== Discography ==
=== Independent Albums ===
- Cam Effect: Reloaded (2011)
- Get It Got It (2014)
- The Wilderness (2023)

=== EPs ===
- Crosslines (2016)
- Before the Wilderness (2018)
