= Alex Story (singer) =

American singer (born 1974)

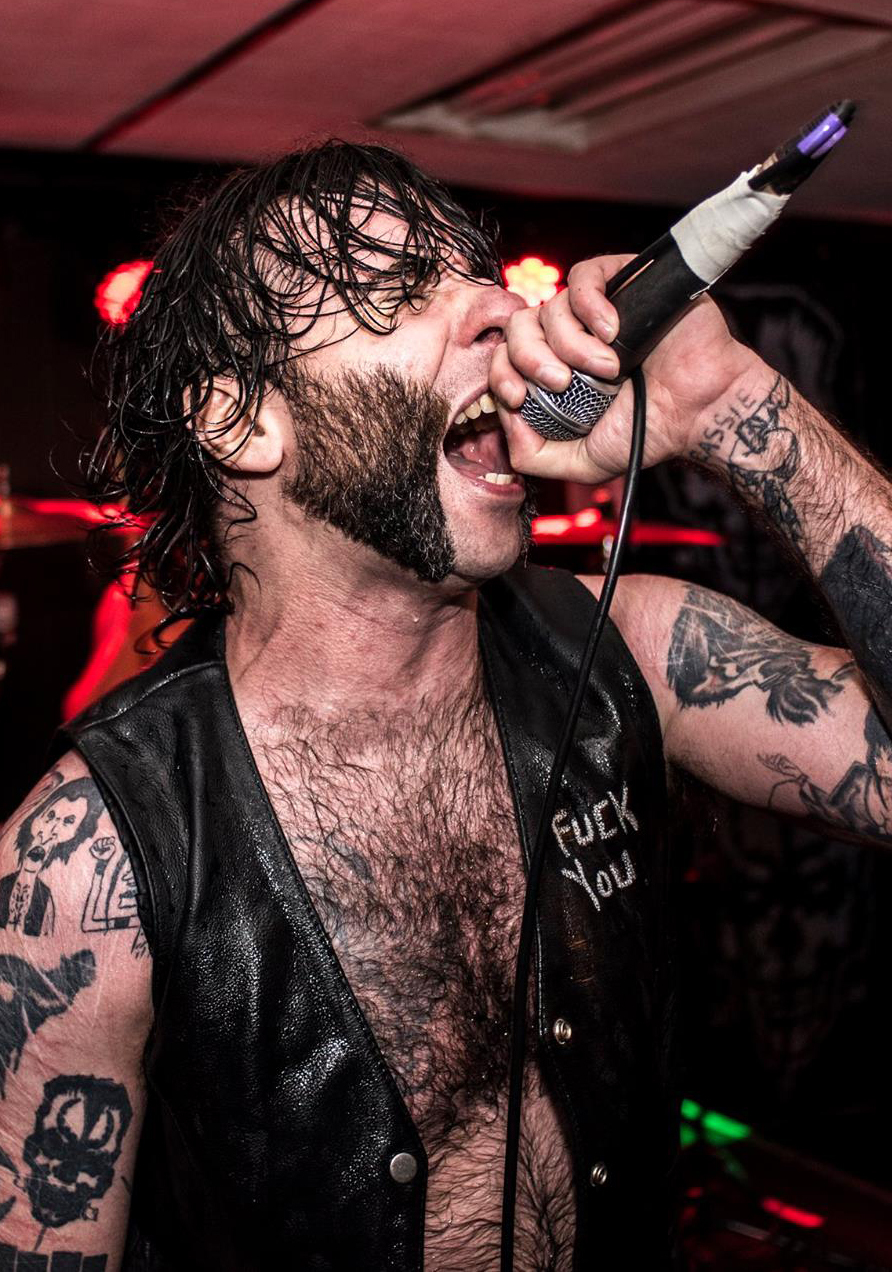
- Story performing in 2017

Background information
- Also known as: Wolfman
- Born: November 27, 1974 (age 51); Decatur, Alabama, U.S.
- Genres: Punk rock, horror punk, heavy metal
- Occupations: Singer, musician
- Instruments: Vocals, guitar
- Years active: 1999–present
- Member of: Cancerslug, Doyle
- Formerly of: Gorgeous Frankenstein
- Website: cancerslug.org

Alex "Wolfman" Story (born November 27, 1974) is an American singer best known for being the lead vocalist of punk/metal bands Cancerslug (1999–present) and Doyle (2013–present). He also performs as a solo artist under his own name, as well as in multiple side projects. Story sports large sideburns and often disguises himself as a werewolf inspired by the 1940s movie The Wolf Man when performing live.

== Life and career ==
Story was born in Decatur, Alabama. He is the founding member of rock/punk group Cancerslug, formed in 1999. He has recorded a dozen albums with this band that encountered various lineup changes before being a long-standing trio with members Mike Horgan on drums and Cassie Baher on bass. Mike Horgan died in March 2019. In early 2020, Jade Jones (b. 1995) became the new drummer.

Among the bands that influenced his songwriting, Story mentions the Misfits, The Cramps, Dwarves, The Germs, and Fear.

Story has also played guitar in other bands such as Bela's Electric Freakshow and Used Skin. While remaining with Cancerslug, he has been working with side bands Clitrot where he plays guitar and does backup vocals. Around 2008, he joined Gorgeous Frankenstein featuring Doyle Wolfgang von Frankenstein, ex-Misfits lead guitarist.

In 2011, he formed the group The Ultra Creeps with Cassie Baher and Helen Faulkner. The band recorded a demo available through Reverbnation.

Since 2013, Story also fronts the horror metal band Doyle with Doyle Wolfgang von Frankenstein. Story and Doyle co-wrote together the album Abominator, released in 2013.

In 2014–2015, Story also released solo albums under his own name and some under his side project named "Born In Angel Blood".

== Discography ==
=== with Cancerslug ===
==== Albums ====
- Whore, not on label, 1999; 2012; Slugcult Records, 2014; Remastered, Alex Story, 2015
- Alabama Bloodbath, 2000; Reissue, Slugcult Records, "The Cancerslug Essentials Collection", 2014
- Soulless, not on label, 2002; Remaster Edition, Slugcult Records, "The Cancerslug Essentials Collection", 2014
- The Beast with Two Backs, 2002; Slugcult Records, "The Cancerslug Essentials Collection", 2014
- Book of Rats, Slugcult Records, 2003; Reissue, Slugcult Records, "The Cancerslug Essentials Collection", 2014
- The Ancient Enemy, 2007; Reissue, Slugcult Records, "The Cancerslug Essentials Collection", 2014
- Tales of a Butcher, Drink Blood Records, 2009
- Seasons of Sickness..., Slugcult Records, 2013; 2014
- Rootwork, Cancerslug, self-release, 2014
- Sassy for Satan, Slugcult Records, 2016
- Symphony of Savagery, Slugcult Records, 2016
- Fuck the Bullshit This Is: Cancerslug, Slugcult Records, 2017
- Beating a Dead Whore, Slugcult Records, 2018
- The Courtesy Flush, Slugcult Records, 2020
- Moonlight Martyrs, Slugcult Records, 2020
- In the Halls of the Hopeless, Slugcult Records, 2021
- Full Term Abortions, Slugcult Records, 2022
- FUCKER, Slugcult Records, 2023
- Puttana Inamorata, Slugcult Records, 2024
- Once Upon A Time In Hell, Slugcult Records, 2026

==== Demos ====
- Curse Arcanum, Demo, 2003; Reissue, Slugcult Records, "The Cancerslug Essentials Collection", 2014
- The Decade of Decay, Demo, 2009; Reissue, Slugcult Records, "The Cancerslug Essentials Collection", 2015
- Most Vile – The Rare Demos, Vol. 1, Cancerslug, self-release, 2014
- Crudest – The Rare Demos, Vol. 2, Cancerslug, self-release, 2014
- Rudest – The Rare Demos, Vol. 3, Cancerslug, self-release, 2014
- Human Traffic Jams: Demos and Acoustic Versions, self-release, 2018
- Live, Slugcult Records, 2026
- Pimp, Cancerslug, Slugcult Records, 2026

==== Singles & EPs ====
- The Unnameable, Cancerslug, self-released, 2006; 2007; Reissue, Slugcult Records, 2012
- CONTROL, Cancerslug, Slugcult Records, 2024
- PussyBoy, Cancerslug, Slugcult Records, 2024
- Mommy's Friend, Cancerslug, Slugcult Records, 2026
- Weapon Of Mass Destruction, Cancerslug, Slugcult Records, 2026
- Bone Marrow, Cancerslug, Slugcult Records, 2026
- Outsider, Cancerslug, Slugcult Records, 2026
- Nasty Habits, Cancerslug, Slugcult Records, 2026
- Bitch, cum on my dick, Cancerslug, Slugcult Records, 2026
- Death Be A Little Bit Closer, Cancerslug, Slugcult Records, 2026

==== Compilations ====
- Battle Hymns I, 2004; Cancerslug, self-released, 2012; Reissue, Slugcult Records, 2015
- Battle Hymns II, 2004; Cancerslug, self-released, 2012
- The Unkindest Cut 2000–2013, Slugcult Records, Alex Story Music, 2013

==== Videos ====
- "Do Demons Sing?", Slugcult Records, 2014

=== with The Ultra Creeps ===
- Demo, on Reverbnation, 2011

=== with Doyle ===
- Abominator, Monster Man Records, 2013
- Doyle II: As We Die, EMP Label Group, Monster Man Records, 2017

=== Solo albums ===
- Alex Story II, Slugcult Records, 2014
- Alex Story III. The Final Ptp, Slugcult Records, 2014
- Pulling the Plug, Slugcult Records, 2014
- The Junkie Chronicles, self-released, 2015
- The Saint of Death, Slugcult Records, 2015
- Blood Meridian, Slugcult Records, 2025
- Serpent Revival, Slugcult Records, 2025

Singles and EPs

- Tracks, Slugcult Records, 2015
- A Special Place, Slugcult Records, 2015
- Lawless, Slugcult Records, 2021
- Lucifer's Fingers, Slugcult Records, 2025
- The Icebreaker, Slugcult Records, 2026
- Unoriginal, Slugcult Records, 2026

Compilations

- Make War Not Love (The Very Best of 'Pulling the Plug'), Slugcult Records, 2014

Born in Angel Blood

- The Lost Requiem, Born in Angel Blood, self-released, 2014
- Alex Story Presents Born in Angel Blood, Sister Lucifer (A Beginners Guide to Mass Suicide), Slugcult Records, 2015

== Books ==
- The Slugcult Bible: The Complete Alex Story Lyrical-Ritual Compendium, CreateSpace Independent Publishing Platform, 2015
- Picking The Vultures Bones, CreateSpace Independent Publishing Platform, 2015
