= My Own (album) =

Studio album by Young Bleed
- Released: October 19, 1999
- Recorded: 1999
- Studio: Bluff Road Recording Studio (Baton Rouge, LA)
- Genres: Southern hip hop; gangsta rap
- Length: 51:03
- Label: Priority
- Producers: Paul "Uncle Pauly" Franklin (exec.); Young Bleed (also exec.); Carlos Wilkerson; Happy Perez; KC Easterwood; Steve Below

Young Bleed chronology
| All I Have in This World, Are... My Balls and My Word (1998) | My Own (1999) | Carleone's Vintage (2002) |

Professional ratings
Review scores
| Source | Rating |
|---|---|
| AllMusic | 4/5 stars |
| Los Angeles Times | 3.5/4 stars |
| The Source | 3.5/5 stars |

My Own is the second studio album by American rapper Young Bleed. It was released on October 19, 1999, through Priority Records. Recording sessions took place at Bluff Road Recording Studio in Baton Rouge, Louisiana. Production was handled by Steve Below, Happy Perez, Carlos "Big Los" Wilkerson, KC Easterwood, and Young Bleed himself, who also served as executive producer together with Paul "Uncle Pauly" Franklin. It features guest appearances from Jennifer Brumfield, Gram, Daz Dillinger, Lay-Lo, Lucky Knuckles and Too $hort. The album peaked at number 61 on the Billboard 200 and number 17 on the Top R&B/Hip-Hop Albums in the United States.

== Critical reception ==
Soren Baker of Los Angeles Times wrote that Young Bleed "masterfully mixes tales of underclass struggle with stories of spiritual awakening … these soul-stirring, bouncy rhythms are built on thick bass guitar licks, chilling piano chords, airy keyboard patterns and choice background vocals".

== Track listing ==
| No. | Title | Producer(s) | Length |
|---|---|---|---|
| 1. | "Bless 'Em All" | Steve Below | 3:09 |
| 2. | "I Couldn't C' It" | Young Bleed | 3:57 |
| 3. | "Trecherous" | Steve Below | 2:28 |
| 4. | "Time and Money" (featuring Too $hort) | Happy Perez | 4:46 |
| 5. | "All They Lef' Me Wuz' da' Streets" (featuring Gram and Jennifer Brumfield) | Happy Perez | 5:31 |
| 6. | "A Husla'" (featuring Daz Dillinger and Lay-Lo) | Steve Below | 4:22 |
| 7. | "No Disrespect" | Carlos "Big Los" Wilkerson | 4:33 |
| 8. | "Minute ta' Breathe" | KC Easterwood | 3:34 |
| 9. | "Give and Take" | Steve Below | 4:15 |
| 10. | "Bounce, Mob, Skate" (featuring Lucky Knuckles and J-Von) | Happy Perez | 4:52 |
| 11. | "To Be a Soldier" | Happy Perez | 4:44 |
| 12. | "My Own" (featuring Jennifer Brumfield and Gram) | Steve Below | 4:52 |
| Total length: | | | 51:03 |

Sample credits

- Track 2 contains elements from "The Blind Man" by New Birth
- Track 6 contains elements from "Love to the People" by Curtis Mayfield

== Personnel ==
- Glenn "Young Bleed" Clifton Jr. – main artist, producer (track 2), executive producer
- Todd "Too $hort" Shaw – vocals (track 4)
- Graham "Gram" Love – vocals (tracks: 5, 12)
- Jennifer Brumfield – vocals (tracks: 5, 12)
- Delmar "Daz Dillinger" Arnaud – vocals (track 6)
- Chad "Max Minelli" Roussel – vocals (track 6)
- J-Von – vocals (tracks: 6, 10)
- Lucky Knuckles – vocals (track 10)
- Shawn Griffin – guitar (track 2), bass guitar (track 6)
- Steve D. Below – producer (tracks: 1, 3, 6, 9, 12)
- Nathan "Happy" Perez – producer (tracks: 4, 5, 10, 11)
- Carlos "Big Los" Wilkerson – producer (track 7)
- Kevin Easterwood Sr. – producer (track 8)
- Mark Williams – engineering, mixing
- Brian "Big Bass" Gardner – mastering
- Paul "Uncle Pauly" Franklin – executive producer
- Pen & Pixel Graphics – artwork, design
- Duffy Rich – A&R
- Kevin Faist – A&R

== Charts ==
| Chart (2000) | Peak position |
|---|---|
| US Billboard 200 | 61 |
| US Top R&B/Hip-Hop Albums (Billboard) | 17 |
