= Tate Publishing & Enterprises =

Christian vanity press

Tate Publishing & Enterprises, LLC was a Christian publisher that printed books that operated on the vanity press model. They ceased operations in January 2017 and owed their customers about $900,000 at the time.

== Background ==
Tate Publishing & Enterprises, LLC operated on the vanity press model in which most authors paid for the publication of their books. Its publishing charges may have been refunded for books with sufficient sales volumes. The company was founded by Richard and Rita Tate and was located in Mustang, Oklahoma.

The company also ran the Tate Music Group record label.

Tate Music Group, the record label division of Tate Publishing & Enterprises, released a number of albums by independent artists. One such release was the 2010 hip‑hop album Who Is Quell Keith by artist Quell Keith.

In May 2012, 25 employees, out of over 200, were fired. According to the company president, this was a disciplinary action rather than a layoff, in response to employee leaks of confidential information related to rumors that the company would be outsourcing its operations to the Philippines.

In January 2017, Tate ceased operation and notified the public that they would no longer accept new authors.

In December 2019, Richard and Ryan Tate, respectively the former founder and CEO, pleaded no contest to 44 criminal charges, including embezzlement, attempted extortion, conspiracy, and racketeering, that were laid in a Canadian County, Oklahoma district court. The presiding judge issued an order for restitution to customers totaling approximately $900,000 over the next 20 years.
