= Abominator (album) =

Studio album by Doyle
- Released: July 30, 2013
- Studio: Slugcult Studios and Von Frankenstein Studios
- Genre: Heavy metal, horror punk
- Length: 48:10
- Label: Monsterman Records
- Producer: Doyle Wolfgang von Frankenstein

Doyle chronology
Abominator (2013)	As We Die (2017)

Abominator is the debut album of the horror punk/heavy metal band Doyle, founded and led by guitarist Doyle Wolfgang von Frankenstein of the Misfits. The album was released in July 2013.

== Release ==
Abominator was digitally released in June 2013 and physically on CD and vinyl in July of that year. It was independently distributed and released on Doyle's own label, Monsterman Records. The CD version of the album included an additional track, "Drawing Down the Moon". Doyle toured extensively in support of the album until the release of their sophomore album in 2017.

== Track listing ==
All tracks are written by Alex Story and Doyle Wolfgang von Frankenstein, except where noted.

No.	Title	Writer(s)	Length
1.	"Abominator"		4:00
2.	"Learn to Bleed"		3:15
3.	"Dreamingdeadgirls"		4:13
4.	"Headhunter"		3:37
5.	"Valley of Shadows"		4:24
6.	"Land of the Dead"		3:36
7.	"Cemeterysexxx"		4:08
8.	"Love Like Murder"		3:31
9.	"Mark of the Beast"	Story, Doyle, Lucas Banker	4:12
10.	"Drawing Down the Moon"	Story, Doyle, Banker	4:16
11.	"Bloodstains"		4:36
12.	"Hope Hell Is Warm"		3:59
Total length:			48:10

Note: The vinyl release switches the tracks "Headhunter" and "Drawing Down the Moon".

== Personnel ==
- Alex "Wolfman" Story – vocals, lyrics
- Doyle Wolfgang von Frankenstein – guitars, bass, musical arrangements, production
- The Abominable Dr. Chud – drums
- Nick Chinboukas – mixing engineer
- Paul Suarez – assistant engineer
- Roger Lian – mastering
- Boriss Wolfgang von Frankenstein – executive producer
