= Chucky Workclothes =

American rapper

- Also known as: Big Chuck, Work Truck Chuck
- Born: Charles Raymond Ditchley; October 5, 1984 (age 41); Indianapolis, Indiana, U.S.
- Genres: Hip hop
- Years active: 2010–present
- Labels: Team Insomniac (Current); Express Life Entertainment; RBC Records (Former)

Charles Raymond Ditchley, also known as Chucky Workclothes (born October 5, 1984) is an American hip-hop artist based out of Indianapolis, Indiana.

== Career ==
Since the start of his rap career in 2010, Chucky Workclothes established his own label, Express Life Entertainment recording "Express Life" Volumes 1, 2, and 3. He has become a well known and established artist in the local rap community.

In January 2014, he was signed to RBC Records for a two album release. The first of the two, "Country Boy Livin'" with Young Bleed was released in June 2014 and followed up with the "Country Boy Livin" Tour to promote the release.

"Tax Season", the second of the two releases, was to be his debut solo album via RBC Records and was released on August 24, 2015. The album features guest appearances from E-40, Pusha T, Kurupt, Young Buck, Young Bleed, Crooked I and more. He has also shared the stage with artist like Lil Wyte and JellyRoll, as well as toured with E-40 on his "Choices Tour".

He is currently working on a three part EP Series titled "Professor Works Laboratory", with the first installment scheduled to be released December 2015.

== Discography ==
=== Studio albums ===
- Tax Season - 2015

=== EP's ===
- Professor Works Laboratory Vol. 1 - 2015
- Professor Works Laboratory Vol. 2 - 2016
- Professor Works Laboratory Vol. 3 - 2017
- Professor Works Laboratory Vol. 4: The Shake Back - 2018

=== Collaboration albums ===
- Country Boy Livin' (with Young Bleed) - 2014
- Consistency Theory (with M7ofatc) - 2018
- Consistency Theory II (with M7ofatc) - 2019

=== Mixtapes ===
- Country Boy Livin' (Blend Tape) (with Young Bleed) - 2015
