= Young Bleed =

American rapper (1974–2025)

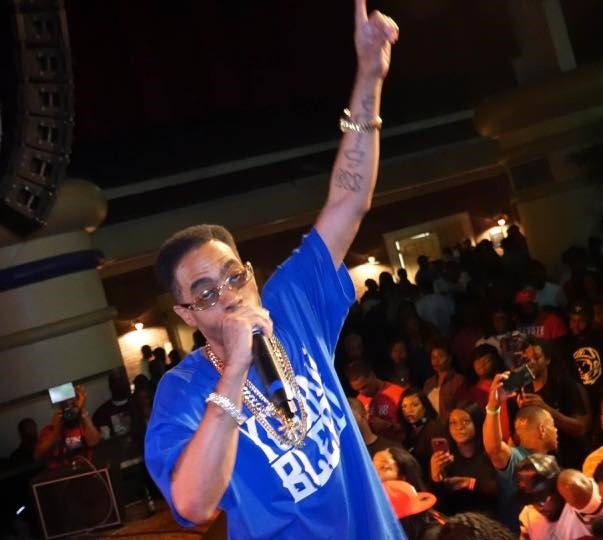
- Bleed in 2017

Background information
- Born: Glenn Clifton Jr. June 6, 1974; Baton Rouge, Louisiana, U.S.
- Died: November 1, 2025 (aged 51) Las Vegas, Nevada, U.S.
- Genres: Hip hop; southern hip hop; gangsta rap
- Occupation: Rapper
- Years active: 1994–2025
- Labels: Trap Door; Strange Lane; Priority; West Coast Mafia; No Limit

Glenn Clifton Jr. (June 6, 1974 – November 1, 2025), also known as Young Bleed, was an American rapper from Baton Rouge, Louisiana.

== Background ==
Young Bleed started rhyming at the age of nine at home in his native Baton Rouge, Louisiana. He was influenced by his mother, who read poetry to him from a young age, as well as by the music of Run-DMC. By his teenage years, Bleed had begun recording his rhymes, selling hip-hop tapes independently to friends on the streets of his neighborhood. He was eventually signed to a local record label. In 1995, he joined with four of his fellow Baton Rouge-based hip-hop artists – C-Loc, Max Minelli, J-Von, and J-Von's younger brother Chris Hamilton – to form the group Concentration Camp, with which he was still affiliated as of 2022.

== Career ==
Young Bleed's first glimpse of national fame was when his song with C-Loc, “How You Do That”, was remixed by Master P of No Limit Records. It was released on the 1997 soundtrack of Master P's film I'm Bout It, which peaked at number one on Billboard’s R&B/Hip Hop album charts in mid-1998. Then, with the help of Master P, he signed a deal with Priority Records to release his major label debut album My Balls & My Word in 1998. The album peaked in at number ten on the Billboard 200 and number one on the Top R&B/Hip Hop album charts and also reached gold & later platinum status in the U.S. The follow-up My Own was released independently of No Limit on Priority, and although it charted on both the Billboard 200 and the Top R&B & Hip-Hop albums charts, it failed to make similar waves as its predecessor.

While in the process of recording his third solo album with Priority, Vintage, Young Bleed was released from his contract and forced to go independent. He joined C-Bo's West Coast Mafia Records and released Rise Thru da Ranks from Earner Tugh Capo in 2005 and Once Upon a Time in Amedica in 2007.

On September 23, 2008, Young Bleed released his fifth album, Off Tha Curb. It is a collaborative album with the up-and-coming rapper Freize.

Young Bleed was signed to a Strange Music subsidiary called Strange Lane Records in 2011, and his first album with the label, Preserved, was released on October 11, 2011. On April 24, 2012, it was announced that Young Bleed had been dropped from Strange Music and signed to another label. In late 2012, he announced his newest album, 'All Amedican', and revealed a release date for October or November 2012. However, the album was pushed back several times and ultimately was not released.

In 2016, Young Bleed announced that he was working on a new studio album. The album, Livin', was released on January 20, 2017.

On March 26, 2018, Young Bleed made an announcement that he would be releasing a new album entitled Wut' Uh' Life. It was the second project to be released under his Trap Door Entertainment aegis.

== Death ==
On October 25, 2025, Clifton appeared at the No Limit Records vs. Cash Money Records Verzuz battle in Las Vegas, Nevada, where he performed "How Ya Do Dat". Following the event, he attended an after-party, where he suffered a sudden brain aneurysm and collapsed. He was rushed to the hospital in critical condition and died on November 1, 2025, at the age of 51.

== Discography ==
=== Studio albums ===
List of albums, with selected chart positions
| Title | Album details | Peak chart positions | | | Certifications |
| Title | Album details | US | US R&B | US Rap | Certifications |
|---|---|---|---|---|---|
| My Balls and My Word | Released: January 20, 1998; Label: No Limit / Priority; Format: CD, digital download, LP | 10 | 1 | - | RIAA: Gold |
| My Own | Released: February 1, 2000; Label: Priority; Format: CD, digital download, LP | 61 | 17 | - | |
| Carleone's Vintage | Released: July 30, 2002; Label: Da'Tention Home; Format: CD, digital download | - | - | - | |
| Rise Thru da Ranks from Earner Tugh Capo | Released: August 23, 2005; Label: West Coast Mafia; Format: CD, digital download | – | 84 | - | |
| Once Upon a Time in Amedica | Released: September 11, 2007; Label: West Coast Mafia; Format: CD, digital download | – | 48 | 25 | |
| Preserved | Released: October 11, 2011; Label: Strange Music; Format: CD, digital download | – | 56 | - | |
| Livin' | Released: February 10, 2017; Label: Trap Door Ent. / Team Mashn; Format: CD, Digital Download | – | – | - | |
| Wut' Uh' Life | Released: June 28, 2019; Label: Trap Door Entertainment; Format: CD, Digital Download | – | – | - | |
| Signs N' Wonders | Released: November 6, 2020; Label: Trap Door Entertainment & Team Insomniac; Format: Digital Download | - | - | - | |

=== Collaboration albums ===
List of collaboration albums and details
| Title | Album details |
|---|---|
| Family Business (with Da Carleone Family) | Released: April 6, 2004; Label: Da'Tention Home; Format: CD, digital download, LP |
| Off Tha Curb (with Freize) | Released: October 21, 2008; Label: Big Weight Entertainment; Format: digital download, LP |
| Country Boy Livin' (with Chucky Workclothes) | Released: July 1, 2014; Label: Trap Door Entertainment; Format: digital download, LP |

=== Mixtapes ===
- Signs N' Wonders (Chopped Not Slopped) (Hosted by OG Ron C) - 2015
- Signs N' Wonders (Slowed & Reverb) (Hosted by DJ Michael Douglas) - 2015
- No Guidelines (Hosted by DJ Choice) - 2015
- Country Boy Livin' (Blendtape) (Hosted by DJ Choice) - 2015
