= 2022 in radio =

The following is a list of events affecting radio broadcasting in 2022. Events listed include radio program debuts, finales, cancellations, and station launches, closures and format changes, as well as information about controversies and deaths of radio personalities.

== Notable events ==
=== January ===
Date	Event	Source
1	Moira Stuart, Kate Garraway and Margherita Taylor are among British broadcasters to be recognised in the 2022 New Year Honours.	
1	US radio station WWHX—Bloomington, Illinois, switches from rhythmic CHR to hot AC after four years at midnight, with a new slogan of "Now 100.7".	
3	US radio station Sports KZIA-HD4/K298BM—Cedar Rapids, Iowa flips from an 'Overtime' brand extension of co-owned KGYM to alternative rock "X107.5".	
6	US company Binnie Media makes format changes for its northern Boston metro cluster in New Hampshire. The adult hits trimulcast of WFNQ—Nashua, WLNH-FM—Laconia and WBYY—Somersworth/Portsmouth flipped to an adult-based Top 40 format, but retained its "Frank FM" branding, while CHR WJYY—Concord/Manchester shifted to rhythmic contemporary with a lean towards hip hop.	
9	Malaysian private radio station Molek FM is officially launched.	
31	US radio station KSEK-FM—Girard, Kansas, changes formats to sports while its former classic rock format moves to KMOQ.	

=== February ===
Date	Event	Source
2	After identifying with the call sign for 96 years, US radio station all-news KOMO—Seattle and FM simulcast KOMO-FM—Oakville change calls to KNWN and KNWN-FM, respectively. The change was necessitated after Lotus Communications purchased the stations from Sinclair Broadcast Group, which retained KOMO-TV and all registered trademarks for the "KOMO" brand. KNWN AM-FM also re-brand as "Northwest News Radio"; the callsign change was prematurely made effective by the FCC at the end of 2021 (and reverted to KOMO AM-FM at Lotus's request), prompting KIRO-FM—Tacoma, Washington to adopt the slogan "Your Northwest News Station".	
9	At 6:00 a.m. EST, after a last playing of "End of the Road" by Boyz II Men, US radio station WMIA-FM—Miami drops its all-90s format after two years and returns to its previous hot AC format and "93.9 MIA" branding.	
14	Friends of US radio station WLRN Inc., which has served as the fundraising arm for the broadcasting operations of the Miami-Dade County Public School District since 1974, agrees to take over full-time management of public radio station WLRN-FM—Miami (and its sister television station) and Florida Keys satellite station WKWM—Marathon. The group had clashed with the school board in recent years after Schools Superintendent Alberto Carvalho and a committee recommended that a competing bid and effective merger into South Florida PBS (owner of WPBT—Miami and WXEL-TV—West Palm Beach) be selected. As with many current arrangements of the same type, the district will retain the license assets and final program authority over the radio and television stations.	
16	US radio station WSYB—Rutland, Vermont, flips from conservative talk to sports.	
24	After 10 days of an A-to-Z marathon, Mexican radio station XETRA-FM—Tijuana switches to classic alternative.	
27	Ukrainian radio station Kraina FM relocates to an undisclosed location in the Carpathian Mountains, following the Russian invasion of Ukraine.	

=== March ===
Date	Event	Source
1	Russian commercial radio station Echo of Moscow is taken off-air by Roskomnadzor because of its coverage of the Russian invasion of Ukraine.	
2	Paul Izard returns US radio station WGWE—Little Valley, New York, to the air after 11 months of silence. Izard later discovered predatory language in WGWE's tower lease agreement and a malfunctioning transmitter that forced WGWE off the air after six weeks; Izard, admitting he had failed to exercise due diligence on WGWE's previous owner the Seneca Nation of Indians, quickly gave the WGWE license (initially surrendered, then restored by the FCC at his request) to regional Christian broadcaster Family Life Ministries for $1 and assumption of debts.	
3	The Board of Directors of Russian commercial radio station Echo of Moscow vote to close the station down.	
4	Radio stations across Europe simultaneously broadcast John Lennon's "Give Peace a Chance".	
11	After nearly 3½ years carrying soft AC under iHeart's The Breeze format, US radio station WISX—Philadelphia changes format to Spanish CHR as WUMR "Rumba 106.1".	
21	Today FM is launched in New Zealand, a talk radio network replacing Magic Talk. Hosts include Tova O'Brien.	
28	US company Ideastream Public Media merges operations of NPR members WKSU—Kent (owned by Kent State University and operated by Ideastream via a public service operating agreement) and WCPN—Cleveland, which adopt a full-time news and information format employing all on-air staff between the two stations. Callsigns and formats are swapped between WCPN and classical music WCLV—Lorain; the former inherits WCPN's former jazz programming in late nights while the latter is turned into a full-power repeater for WKSU. WKSU drops all classical programming and simulcasts WCLV on their HD3 subchannel.	
31	Australian radio network ARN Media rebranded The Edge 96.ONE as CADA, reformatted as an urban contemporary station.	

=== April ===
Date	Event	Source
1	Maritime Broadcasting System's CHLQ-FM in Charlottetown, Prince Edward Island drops its longtime Q93 branding and rebrands to Max 93.1. The station's format remains Mainstream Rock.	
4	US company Ryman Hospitality Properties, parent company of Opry Entertainment Group and WSM—Nashville and co-owner of Circle, sells a minority stake in the company to a group consisting of Atairos and NBCUniversal, for approximately $300 million. Outside network news talent licensing agreements for newscasts and commentary and the defunct NBC Sports Radio network, it is the network's first involvement in a radio property since the NBC Radio Network wound down between 1987 and 1989.	
18	US company Cumulus Media purchases the intellectual property and associated trademarks for "Q101", including the q101.com domain name, from Broadcast Barter Radio Networks for an undisclosed amount. Broadcast Barter, which acquired the intellectual property from Emmis Communications in August 2011 after their sale of alternative WKQX—Chicago (and format flip to "FM News 101" WIQI), launched internet station Q101 Chicago, which operated up to this sale. WKQX, which reverted to alternative in 2014 but instead branded as "101 WKQX", readopted the "Q101" name on May 3 during the station's "10th anniversary" concert (which celebrated the launch of the current iteration of the format on then-WKQX-LP).	
20	US company Marquee Broadcasting purchases the Southeastern Ohio Broadcasting System, Inc. (d/b/a WHIZ Media Group), owner of WHIZ—Zanesville, Ohio (full-service–talk), WHIZ-FM—South Zanesville, Ohio (CHR), WZVL—Philo, Ohio (country) and WHIZ-TV. This ends nearly 75 years of continuous ownership of WHIZ AM-FM-TV by the Littick family, which retains the license for Columbus-market WWLG—Baltimore, Ohio (operated under long-term LMA by Urban One), while also becoming Marquee's first radio properties.	
28	After nearly 35 years of being known as either "Oldies 98" or "98.1 WOGL", classic hits US radio station WOGL—Philadelphia relaunches as "Big 98.1". Morning host Sean "Coop" Tabler is retained but all other air talent departs, though most of them were voice-tracked from other Audacy-owned stations. Bob Pantano’s Dance Party, which debuted with the original oldies format in 1987, is moved to WOGL's second digital subchannel. The "fresh start" rebrand is done as part of the long-term industry distancing from the oldies label of older music, as WOGL continued to be known casually as "Oldies 98" among listeners long after it dropped the branding.	
29	Danny Bonaduce announces a medical leave of absence from The Danny Bonaduce and Sarah Morning Show on US radio station KZOK-FM—Seattle.	
29	Spanish Broadcasting System takes over the operations of US radio stations WSUN—Holiday/Tampa and WPYO—Maitland/Orlando from a divestiture trust held by Cox Media Group since Apollo Global Management's 2019 takeover of the chain. The trust had a required deadline of December 2021 for a sale of both stations; a request from Cox to extend the deadline by one year prompted SBS to allege Cox was not acting in good faith after repeated delays in sale negotiations. The FCC extended the deadline to February, when the purchase was made. Cox moves the formats of WSUN (alternative rock) and WPYO (CHR) to HD digital subchannels elsewhere in the cluster, with the former adding a low-power analog translator. SBS begins stunting on both stations in anticipation of debuting Spanish tropical formats branded "El Zol".	

=== May ===
Date	Event	Source
3	After a 41-year run as morning host at US radio station WXKS-FM—Medford/Boston, Matt Siegel abruptly announces his retirement via a pre-recorded message and following a prior unannounced and unexplained two-week absence. Billy Costa, a co-host on Matty in the Morning, takes over as interim host.	
3	US radio station WSM—Nashville's Midnite Jamboree airs a diamond anniversary special which also acts as the series finale, concluding its 75-year run. The weekly program ended production in March after the Ernest Tubb Record Shop—which brokered the time slot from WSM and originated the Jamboree broadcasts—went out of business due to "circumstances out of (the shop's) control."	
11	US soft adult contemporary station KQKK—Walker, Minnesota switches to classic hits as “101.9 The Arrow”, while KAKK switches from classic hits format to sports.	
18	US classic rock station KTRX—Dickson, Oklahoma, after 21 years in the format, relaunches as hot AC "Star 92.7".	
27	US adult contemporary station KZSQ-FM—Sonora, California, flips to classic hits as "Star 92.7".	
30	US CHR station KDWO—Fresno, California, flips to classic hits as "K-Jewel" KJWL, while classic hits KJWL—San Joaquin, California, flips to classic country as "The Legend" KDWO.	

=== June ===
Date	Event	Source
2	The State University of New York, United States, allows the licenses of four of its student-run college radio stations—WCEB from Corning Community College, WAIH from SUNY Potsdam, WQKE from SUNY Plattsburgh and WETD from Alfred State College—to lapse during the colleges' summer vacation, thus ending the stations' over-the-air operations. A fifth SUNY radio station, Genesee Community College's WGCC-FM, was previously allowed to lapse but was reinstated to allow its sale to Family Life Network. SUNY's other student radio stations were unaffected.	
3	US company TelevisaUnivision agrees in principle to sell 18 of their radio stations, including WAQI—Miami, WADO—New York City and KTNQ—Los Angeles, to Latino Media Network for $60 million in a year-long transitional process. The composition and financing of Latino Media Network, which includes several political activists affiliated with the Democratic Party, attracts negative attention from both WAQI's anti-Castro Cuban exile listenership and Florida Republican politicians.	
8	Russian radio station Kommersant FM is quickly taken off air after hackers take over and interrupt the lunchtime news bulletin by playing the Ukrainian national anthem and anti-war songs.	
10	Australian commercial radio station 2CH, owned by Sports Entertainment Network, changes formats to all-sports.	
29	After cancelling their morning show the day before, Canadian Hot AC "Kiss Radio" CKKS-FM—Chilliwack/Abbotsford/Vancouver abruptly dismisses the rest of their air staff and proceeds to play Rage Against the Machine's "Killing in the Name" in a loop for 24 hours, a stunt that unexpectedly results in international press coverage. CKKS-FM relaunches as modern rock "Sonic Radio" the next day; the brand had been previously used by CKKS-FM predecessor CFUN-FM from 2011 to 2015, but with a CHR presentation.	

=== July ===
Date	Event	Source
1	After 8 months of two US iHeartMedia stations in Rochester, New York (WDVI and WNBL) playing an identical country format after WDVI's flip to country in October 2021, WNBL flips to 1980s' hits as "Big 107.3".	
1	Five radio stations in Eagle Pass and Uvalde, Texas, owned by US company South Texas Radio—KINL, KEPS, KBNU, KUVA and KVOU-FM—suspend operations, dismissing all off- and on-air personnel. Attributed to economic conditions on the Mexico–U.S. border and the loss of transmitter tower site leases for all five stations, South Texas Radio's holdings are later sold for a combined $200.	
2	Jim Pattison's Group CHWK-FM in Chilliwack, British Columbia drops its classic hits format and the "Drive" branding and flips to country branded as 89.5 JR Country patterned after its sister station CJJR-FM in Vancouver.	
6	A trio of radio stations in Tifton, Georgia, United States: WFFM, WTIF, & WTIF-FM cease operations because their parent company was sold leaving them without transmission equipment.	
7	Vista Radio's CJCS-FM in Stratford, Ontario drops its "Juice" branding and returns to using its previous historic call letters but retains its classic hits format.	
14	After 14 years of simulcasting US radio station KDVV—Topeka, move-in station KDVB flips to hip hop/R&B under the “96.9 The Beat” branding and KQRB callsign, becoming the second such formatted station in Kansas’ capital city, United States.	
18	Durham Radio launches Wave 98.3 FM in Vancouver, British Columbia with a smooth jazz/rhythmic AC format.	
19	After 18 months as a regional Mexican format as “Lo Mejor 94.7 FM” US radio station KVLL-FM flips to Spanish adult hits as “94.7 Juan FM” meaning that there are 3 Spanish stations named “Juan” in the Lufkin, Texas, media market	
25	Canadian radio station CKPK-FM—Vancouver changes to adult contemporary as "Now 102.7! Radio", and its previous alternative format moves to its HD2 signal.	

=== August ===
Date	Event	Source
1	Following a weekend of stunting, US station WOTW—Windermere/Orlando adopts rhythmic-leaning Top 40 as WFYY “Fly 103.1”.	
8	US radio station WSWW-FM—Craigsville, West Virginia flips from a simulcast of talk WJLS to country as “95.7 Lake Country 3WS”.	
10	Angela Yee announces her departure from The Breakfast Club after 12 years to launch her own show.	
13	US CHR station WNOW-FM—Indianapolis begins simulcasting hip-hop WHHH for 17 days, brought on by WHHH owner Urban One selling the station to BBN (itself necessitated by Urban One's purchase of Emmis Communications's Indianapolis properties). WHHH is relaunched as WYHX on August 30, while WNOW-FM assumes the WHHH calls and format outright.	
22	Heize takes over from Shin Ye-eun as presenter of Volume Up on Korean radio station HLKC-FM.	

=== September ===
Date	Event	Source
6	US country station KATO-FM—New Ulm, Minnesota, launches classic hits "KATO Hits 93.1", with KXAC—St. James, Minnesota, assuming the country format and "Minnesota 100" branding.	
10	For the benefit of Italian minorities in Slovenia and Croatia, Rai Radio 1, makes the medium wave radio signal from the Venezia1 transmitter, previously receivable on the 936 kHz frequency throughout the Upper Adriatic basin, available live on Radio1 on digital terrestrial for smart TV owners, in streaming on the regional Rai website and in free-to-air on the satellite 13.0 ° E Hot Bird 13C frequency 11766.00 MHz polarization V 52 HB9 Europe DVB-S2 8PSK 29900 3/4.	
19	US radio station KKBR—Billings, Montana, flips formats from CHR "KISS 97.1" to Hot AC "Mix 97.1".	
23	WWJ—Detroit news anchor Jim Matthews is found murdered in his home in Chesterfield, Michigan, United States. His girlfriend and their two children and two other children from his previous relationship were also wounded in the incident, as well as a friend who tried to intentionally overdose.	
30	Australian DJ Kyle Sandilands launches a verbal attack on his employer, Sydney radio station 2WFM. He states that "Everyone is a loser, except for everyone on this show, everyone else outside of this show is a massive loser. I am not joking."	

=== October ===
Date	Event	Source
3	Filipino radio journalist Percy "Lapid" Mabasa, 63, host of DWBL's Lapid Fire, is shot dead in Manila while driving home from work. Reporters Without Borders calls for an independent investigation into the death of the government critic.	
3	US active rock station KEGL—Fort Worth, Texas, switches to a talk/sports hybrid as "97.1 The Freak". Among the on-air hosts is Mike Rhyner, credited for helping launch KTCK's all-sports format in 1994 and a fixture at that station until 2020.	
7	Jim Pattison Group rebrands its country stations CHBZ-FM in Cranbrook, British Columbia, CHLB-FM in Lethbridge, Alberta and CHAT-FM in Medicine Hat, Alberta to the "Wild" branding patterned after its Calgary station CKWD-FM.	
10	US company Audacy announced all-news WINS—New York City would add an FM simulcast on October 27 over alternative WNYL, to be renamed WINS-FM. This announcement was tied to a new agreement with SAG-AFTRA allowing Audacy to begin consolidation of off- and -on-air staffing between WINS and WCBS, which were co-owned since Westinghouse Broadcasting's 1995 merger with CBS Inc., but heretofore operated as distinct, competing all-news stations.	
14	Eleven radio stations across Europe participate in Europe's Biggest Dance Show 2022. The dance music simulcast is presented by Euroradio and hosted by BBC Radio 1 (UK), in collaboration with ten other radio stations from across Europe: 1LIVE (Germany), FM4 (Austria), Fritz (Germany), NPO 3FM (Netherlands), NRK mP3 (Norway), RTÉ 2FM (Ireland), Studio Brussel (Belgium), SR P3 (Sweden), YleX (Finland), and Radio Promin of Ukrainian national broadcasting company UA:PBC.	
14	US broadcaster Jim Bohannon retires from radio, ending his late-night talk show which was launched in 1993 over Mutual. Bohannon's announcement came after he revealed his diagnosis with terminal stage 4 esophageal cancer in an interview with Talkers Magazine. Bohannon had missed much of summer 2022 and ultimately died 29 days later. Rich Valdes, a producer for The Mark Levin Show, took over the Westwood One program the following week.	
16	French radio network RTL announces that it will end long wave broadcasts on January 1, 2023, in order to reduce the company's energy use.	
18	BBC Radio celebrates the 100th anniversary of the creation of the British Broadcasting Company Ltd	
26	US company Cumulus Media debuts a virtual museum for "99X Atlanta" commemorating the 30th anniversary of WNNX—Atlanta's flip to modern rock, which it featured from 1992 to 2008. The format and "99X" name have since been revived multiple times over the current WWWQ-HD2 and various low-power translators.	
28	In one of the latest such instances in a decade, KRMD—Shreveport, Louisiana becomes the first station in the United States to flip to Christmas music for the 2022 season. The flip goes largely unnoticed for nearly three days after the change.	

=== November ===
Date	Event	Source
1	US CHR station WNUU—Starview, Pennsylvania, begins stunting with Christmas music.	
1	US classical music outlet WCLV—Cleveland marks the 60th anniversary of WDGO (95.5 FM)'s call sign change to the first WCLV. While WCLV's name and format was re-established twice—first on a suburban FM signal in 2001 and on 90.3 FM in March 2022—and converted from commercial to non-commercial broadcasting in 2013, its intellectual property is regarded as uninterrupted.	
9	US radio station WTWW 5.085/9.94 in Lebanon, Tennessee, abruptly leaves the air, with intent to continue as a streaming station. WTWW had operated as a commercially supported gold classic hits station—the only shortwave station in the United States to program itself in such a manner—for its entire existence. Ted Randall, manager of the station and owner of the format rights, cited an increase in transmitter rental cost, driven mainly by electricity prices, that was far beyond the amount of money the station earned in revenue. Glenn Hauser claimed that the shutdown stemmed to issues with the station's primary financial supporter, LaPorte Church of Christ, which the station's managers eventually confirmed when reviving the format on WRMI five days later. The classic hits programming returned to 5.085, under WRMI's license from their Okeechobee, Florida transmitter, site, for several days beginning December 18, before LaPorte objected and returned WTWW to the air later that week. WRMI has since aired the classic hits programming on 4.980.	
14	Maritime Broadcasting System's CKNB in Campbellton, New Brunswick abandons its AM 950 signal and moves to the FM dial at 100.7 relaunching as Hits 100.	
18	US radio station WZTK—Alpena, Michigan, announces a pending switch to all-Christmas music on Thanksgiving, dropping talk programming inherited from the former WATZ in 2014 and implied a format change at the beginning of 2023.	
22	US conservative talk stations KQOB and KZLS—Enid, Oklahoma, rebrand from "The Eagle" to "Freedom 96.9".	
24	Digital radio station River Radio, based in Derry, tops the Northern Ireland list for Digital Radio Station of the Year at the UK Community Radio Awards.	

=== December ===
Date	Event	Source
5	After dropping the syndicated Elliot in the Morning and stunting throughout the preceding weekend with a loop of The Verve's "Bitter Sweet Symphony", US active rock station WNNX—College Park, Georgia, is relaunched as classic alternative "99X", reviving a brand which co-owned WWWQ—Atlanta featured from 1992 to 2008 under the WNNX calls and heretofore on WWWQ-HD2 in various incarnations. (The first song played, "Video Killed the Radio Star" by The Buggles, was also the same song used to launch the original "99X" in 1992.) The weekend-long stunt, interspersed with "same as it ever was" liners, was a callback to when the original "99X" looped "Bitter Sweet Symphony" for 30 minutes in 1997 to bring attention to the song.	
31	Westwood One will cancel The Lia Show after a 24-year run in syndication. Lia had been syndicated across the United States as an evening show for country music stations since 1998 (including on delay on Nash FM from 2020 until its end), and several years before that on stations in Washington.	

== Deaths ==
Date	Name	Age	Nationality and notability	Source
January 1	Dan Reeves	78	American football player (Dallas Cowboys), coach (Dallas Cowboys, Denver Broncos, New York Giants, Atlanta Falcons) and broadcaster (color commentator for the NFL on Westwood One Sports)	
January 15	Ralph Emery	88	American country music disc jockey (WSM—Nashville)	
February 3	Dieter Mann	80	German actor, director, university professor, and radio personality	
February 12	Frank Beckmann	72	German-American talk show host (WJR—Detroit) and sportscaster (Michigan Sports Network)	
February 15	P. J. O'Rourke	74	American political satirist, journalist, and frequent panelist on NPR's Wait Wait... Don't Tell Me!	
March 13	Mary Lee	100	Scottish singer and broadcaster (Radio Clyde)	
March 17	Bobby Nalzaro	58	Filipino broadcast journalist and radio commentator	
April 18	Sid Mark	88	American radio host best known for nationally syndicated Frank Sinatra-themed broadcasts (WHAT-FM/WWDB, later WPHT—Philadelphia) from 1957 to 2022	
April 28	Vira Hyrych	54	Ukrainian journalist and radio producer (Radio Free Europe/Radio Liberty), killed in missile attack	
May 3	Bobby O'Jay	68	American R&B disc jockey (WDIA—Memphis, Tennessee)	
May 7	Bob Romanik	72	American paleoconservative shock jock (KQQZ—Fairview Heights, Illinois) later revealed to be a silent partner in the ownership of KQQZ and three other AM stations in Greater St. Louis despite being a convicted felon.	
May 8	André Arthur	78	Canadian radio host and politician	
May 20	Hillar Palamets	94	Estonian historian and radio presenter	
June 4	John Berks	80	South African radio presenter (Radio 702, Johannesburg)	
June 10	Baxter Black	77	American writer, poet, and essayist for NPR's Morning Edition	
June 12	Vello Lään	85	Estonian sports journalist, writer and radio broadcaster, director of Tartu Radio	
July 5	Cacho Fontana	90	Argentine broadcaster	
August 2	Vin Scully	94	American sportscaster (Los Angeles Dodgers)	
August 19	Ed Christian	78	American businessman/executive (founder/CEO of Saga Communications)	
September 11	Kim Lenaghan	61	Northern Irish freelance radio and television broadcaster, writer and critic (BBC Radio Ulster)	
September 12	Lowry Mays	87	Founder and CEO of Clear Channel Communications	
October 3	Nicolas Tikhobrazoff	76	French artist and radio host (Radio Courtoisie)	
October 4	Loretta Lynn	90	American country musician (member of the Grand Ole Opry)	
October 5	Bernard McGuirk	64	American radio host and producer (producer on Imus in the Morning and host of its successor Bernie & Sid with Sid Rosenberg)	
October 7	Art Laboe	97	Armenian-American disc jockey, songwriter, record producer, and radio station owner (KDAY—Los Angeles)	
October 8	Charlie Brown	80	American disc jockey & host of the syndicated Carolina Beach Music show On the Beach with Charlie Brown.	
October 8	Val Joyce	91	Irish radio broadcaster	
October 17	Reza Haghighatnejad	45	Iranian journalist (Radio Farda)	
October 25	Halit Kıvanç	97	Turkish journalist, television and radio presenter	
October 31	Jeremy Mansfield	59	South African radio and TV presenter	
November 12	Jim Bohannon	78	American talk show host (hosted America in the Morning and The Jim Bohannon Show for Westwood One from 1993 until his death)	
November 17	Annika Biørnstad	64	Norwegian broadcasting executive	
December 2	Jharana Das	77	Indian journalist, actress and announcer	
December 4	Norman Pattiz	79	American broadcasting executive; founder of the original Westwood One network and podcast distributor PodcastOne; purchased the Mutual Broadcasting System in 1985 and both the NBC Radio Network and Radio & Records in 1987.	
December 31	Walter Ulloa	74	American broadcasting executive; co-founder, chairman and CEO of Entravision Communications.	

== See also ==
- 2022 in British radio
