= WTIF =

WTIF may refer to:

- WTIF (AM), a radio station (1340 AM) licensed to Tifton, Georgia, United States
- WTIF-FM, a radio station (107.5 FM) licensed to Omega, Georgia, United States
