= WJLS =

WJLS can refer to:

- WJLS (AM), a radio station broadcasting at 560 kHz on the AM band, licensed to Beckley, West Virginia
- WJLS-FM, a radio station broadcasting at 99.5 MHz on the FM band, licensed to Beckley, West Virginia
