= Return to Earth =

Return to Earth may refer to:

- Return to Earth (film), a 1976 American biopic TV movie
- Return to Earth (album), a 2006 album by Michale Graves
- Doctor Who: Return to Earth, a 2010 video game for the Nintendo Wii
