= KVOU =

KVOU may refer to:

- KVOU-FM, a radio station (104.9 FM) licensed to serve Uvalde, Texas, United States
- KGWU, a radio station (1400 AM) licensed to serve Uvalde, Texas, which held the call sign KVOU until 2012
