= WAIH =

WAIH may refer to:

- WAIH (FM), a radio station (96.5 FM) licensed to serve Holly Springs, Mississippi, United States
- WAIH (New York), a defunct radio station (90.3 FM) formerly licensed to serve Potsdam, New York, United States
