= WSWW =

WSWW may refer to:

- WSWW (AM), a radio station (1490 AM) licensed to Charleston, West Virginia.
- WSWW-FM, a radio station (95.7 FM) licensed to Craigsville, West Virginia.
