= Gotham Road =

American horror punk band

- Origin: New Jersey, U.S.
- Genres: Heavy metal, horror punk
- Years active: 2002–2004; 2008, 2009, 2014 (reunions)
- Labels: None
- Members: Michale Graves; Carlos "Loki" Cofino; J.V. Bastard; Paul Lifeless

Gotham Road (or Gotham Rd.) is a horror punk/heavy metal band formed after the demise of the band Graves by Michale Graves, Carlos "Loki" Cofino, J.V. Bastard and Paul Lifeless.

== History ==
=== Formation ===
The band first formed under the assumed name of Graves and recorded a demo in 2002 which was essentially composed of re-recorded Graves songs with a heavier musical element. In 2003, the group went on to change its name to Gotham Road and recorded the Seasons of the Witch EP which contained five new songs as well as two reworked Graves songs.

Gotham Road went on the "Seasons of the Witch Tour" to support the EP in 2003. The following year they recorded a three-song demo and thus departed on their sixty city "Mourning Light Tour", during which the band was denied entry to Canada and had to cancel subsequent shows. The band had also booked a European tour which they had to cancel due to venues backing out according to Graves due to his outspoken "conservative punk" views.

The band would go on to play numerous shows and, in December 2004, played a farewell show before Michale Graves' departure for the Marines.

Graves was then approached by Horror High Records to record a solo album, the subsequent album Punk Rock Is Dead featured Paul Lifeless on drums. He was later honorably discharged from the Marines due to a back injury, and embarked on a tour to promote his new album that featured the members of Gotham Road as his backing band as well as openers Trashlight Vision. Few one-off Gotham Road shows followed.

=== Hiatus ===
The band has, as of late, been on indefinite hiatus as each of the members have all gone on to different projects. Michale has continued on with his solo efforts, taking JV Bastard along as a touring bassist for his solo band; Paul Lifeless went on to work with Know Your Enemy and currently Mister Monster as well as The Banner; Loki and JV Bastard recently formed The Doomsday Prophecy, a metal band which has been developing a cult following in the New York/New Jersey area.

=== Reunion ===
On April 12, 2008, Gotham Road reunited for one show in Belmar, New Jersey. The band also re-released their CD Seasons of the Witch through MP3 download, replete with eight bonus tracks. The band also contributed two songs to the German compilation CD Get Acquainted Vol. 1.

The latest word is that due to Paul's obligation to his successful hardcore band The Banner he will not rejoin the band in the immediate future. Paul currently plays in the punk/surf band Killed by the Bull from North Jersey, which also features ex-members of the Banner as well as Captives and Distance.

On December 31, 2009, Gotham Road played a show at Dingbatz and then again on January 4, 2014 as part of a benefit show for a friend of the bands.

== Members ==
- Michale Graves – vocals
- Carlos "Loki" Cofino – guitar
- J.V. Bastard – bass
- Paul Lifeless – drums

== Discography ==
- Untitled five-song demo (2003)
- Seasons of the Witch (2003) – EP
- Untitled three-song demo (2004)
- Seasons of the Witch (2008) – internet-only LP
- Sampler: Get Acquainted Vol. 1 (2008) (including "On My Way" and "Say Something")
- Sampler: Get Acquainted Vol. 2 (2009) (including "All the Cars" and "You Awful Me")
- Sampler: The Sound of Horror Vol. 1 (2010) (including "On My Way")
