= WBKW (disambiguation) =

WBKW may refer to:

== Radio stations ==
- 1070 WBKW Beckley, West Virginia (Facility ID #61276) — an AM radio station known as "Relevant Radio", formerly WIWS from 1990 to 2011
- 99.5 WJLS-FM Beckley, West Virginia (Facility ID #52336) — an FM radio station with the call sign WBKW from 1957 to 1990
- 91.5 WPIN-FM Dublin, Virginia (Facility ID #53090) — an FM radio station that was WBKW from August 1990 to September 1993
- 98.7 WCNK Key West, Florida (Facility ID #34363) — an FM station that was briefly WBKW in 1996

== Other ==
- Tawau Airport — an airport in Tawau, Sabah, Malaysia, with the ICAO airport code WBKW and IATA code TWU
