= Nick Rizzuto =

Nick Rizzuto may refer to:

- Nick Rizzuto (radio producer)
- Nicolo Rizzuto (1924–2010), Montreal-based Mafioso don, father of Vito Rizzuto
- Nick Rizzuto Jr. (died 2009), Montreal-based Mafioso, son of Vito Rizzuto

== See also ==
- Rizzuto crime family
