= WMGA (AM) =

Radio station in Moultrie, Georgia (1939–2003)

Moultrie, Georgia; United States
- Frequency: 580 kHz

Ownership
- Owner: Radio Moultrie, Inc.

History
- First air date: November 25, 1939; 85 years ago
- Last air date: 2003
- Former frequencies: 1370 kHz (1939–1941); 1400 kHz (1941–1969); 1130 kHz (1969–1989)
- Call sign meaning: Moultrie, Georgia

Technical information
- Facility ID: 54680
- Power: 900 watts day; 250 watts night
- Transmitter coordinates: 31°12′7.87″N 83°47′2.03″W

WMGA was a radio station broadcasting on 580 kHz in Moultrie, Georgia, United States. Last licensed to Radio Moultrie, Inc., it operated between 1939 and 2003 from a site on the town's northern edge.

WMGA was the first radio station built in Colquitt County. However, it had its license revoked by the Federal Communications Commission (FCC) in 2003 due to a series of unauthorized transfers of control.

== History ==
Frank R. Pidcock, Sr., a railroad executive and local businessman, was granted a construction permit to build a radio station with 250 watts day and 100 night (changed before launch to 250 watts) on 1370 kHz in Moultrie on July 12, 1939. WMGA began its broadcasts on November 25, and it remained on 1370 until March 29, 1941, when NARBA reallocation moved it to 1400 kHz. Frank Pidcock sold the station to his son John in 1946, and in 1948, it began a long-running association with ABC Radio. Roy Zess, station manager, acquired a stake in the station in 1954, and it increased daytime power to 1,000 watts on the 1400 frequency in 1961.

In 1964, WMGA applied for a second upgrade—to move to 1130 kHz and increase power to 10,000 watts day—which would make it the most powerful station between Macon and Jacksonville. After four years of work with the FCC, approval was given in June 1968. The move to 1130 came on April 18, 1969, after the original 335-foot (102 m) tower was flanked by two new 217.5-foot (66.3 m) masts to produce a directional pattern.

The Pidcock–Zess partnership continued to own WMGA until 1986, when Radio Moultrie, Inc. (RMI) acquired the station; the company was a partnership of two men from other cities in Southwest Georgia, Jim Hardy and Douglas Sutton. A minority owner was 25-year-old Art Sutton, who also was the general manager and morning host and had saved money from his sales commissions at his previous job at WTIF in Tifton; the new ownership sought to revive the once-"atrocious" station where listeners had once been invited by announcers to donate their records. The new ownership revamped the adult contemporary format and applied for a second change in frequency, this time to the lower frequency of 580 kHz, which would result in a nighttime signal covering all of Colquitt County. WMGA made the move to 580 on December 11, 1989. After a stock sale in 1990 (not reported to the FCC until the next year) in which Hardy sold all of his stake and new stock was issued to make Sutton a one-third partner with new owners James Elder Sr. and G. Christopher Elder, a dispute occurred that saw Sutton resign as general manager and be removed as an officer; he then sold the remainder of his stake in 1992.

In 1998, a sequence of events began that would lead to the station's ultimate downfall. That year, the Elders entered into a time brokerage agreement with Dixie Broadcasting, Inc., which would operate the station until the two parties could agree on a sale price. No sale application was ever filed, in part because Radio Moultrie, Inc., the licensee, refused to cooperate. In 2000, Dixie then acquired a lien held by Hardy and agreed to sublease the station to Aubrey Smith and Sam and Grace Zamarron; Dixie represented to Smith and the Zamarrons that it owned the studios and equipment, even though it was not the licensee. Under the Smith-Zamarrón management, the station rebroadcast Atlanta-area Spanish-language station WAOS "La Favorita".

As a result, control of the station had been transferred two times without FCC consent, as an FCC field agent learned upon visiting Moultrie on April 21, 2001. The inspector not only found evidence that RMI had completely abdicated control over WMGA's affairs, but the station was in technical disarray: the towers had been left unlit at night and were in need of repainting, the station was not using the appropriate directional array during critical hours, and its Emergency Alert System equipment was not in service, among other violations. An investigation followed, during which Radio Moultrie failed to respond to two letters of inquiry directed at the firm; as a result of RMI's lack of response and the unauthorized transfers of control, the FCC determined that Radio Moultrie "does not possess the requisite qualifications to be or remain a Commission licensee" and ordered the license revoked on November 4, 2003.
