= Open carry guitar rally =

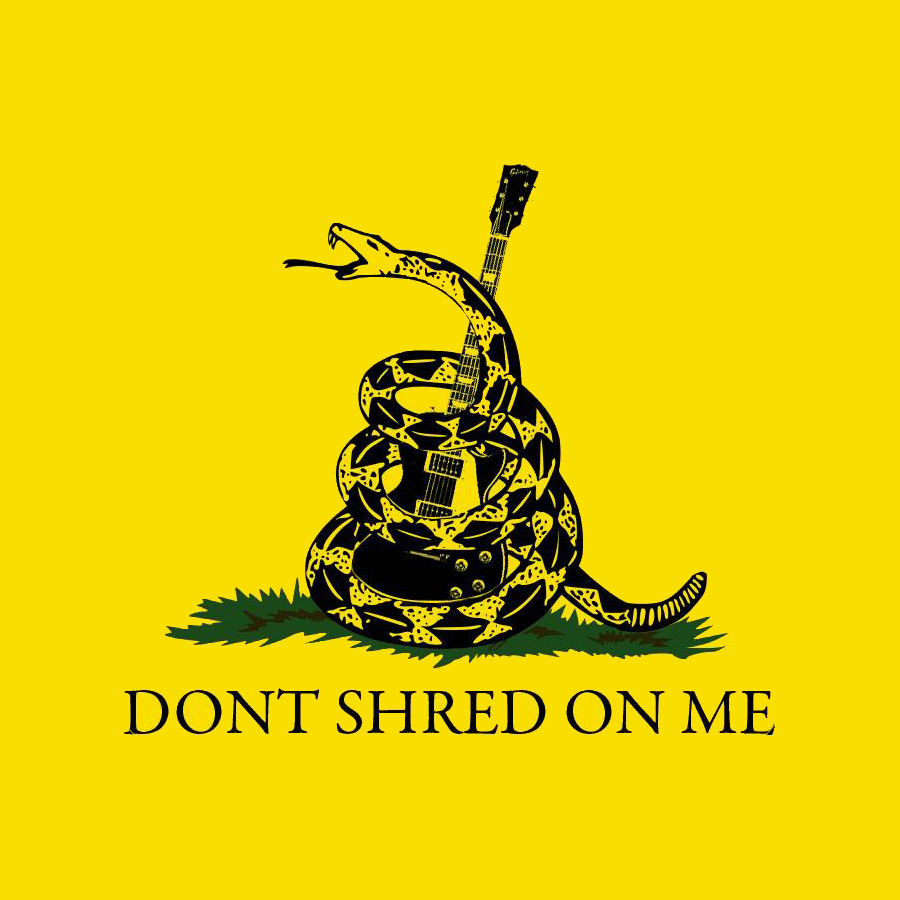
Don't Shred On Me Logo created by Pat Ramseur for the Open Carry Guitar Rally held July 4, 2014 in Dallas, Texas

Open Carry Guitar Rally is a concept created by Barry Kooda in response to the Open Carry gun movement. During an Open Carry Guitar Rally, citizens congregate in a public place while displaying their instruments, a parody of similar gatherings held by gun rights activists.

== Background ==
The event originated in Dallas, Texas, where it received the support of the local Dallas art and music communities. Kooda is a member of the Dallas-based punk rock band The Nervebreakers. Since then, these rallies have occurred in several cities across the United States. These events are attended by people with varying degrees of opinions concerning gun rights and legislation; while some attendees express anti-gun sentiment, others view the gatherings simply as an opportunity to enjoy the camaraderie of fellow guitar enthusiasts.

The Open Carry Guitar Rally was organized using the open source concept. The idea, and all artwork and images are free for use for others to use to organize their own open carry guitar rallies, provided proper credit is given to the artists and contributors.

== Events ==
=== Dallas, Texas ===
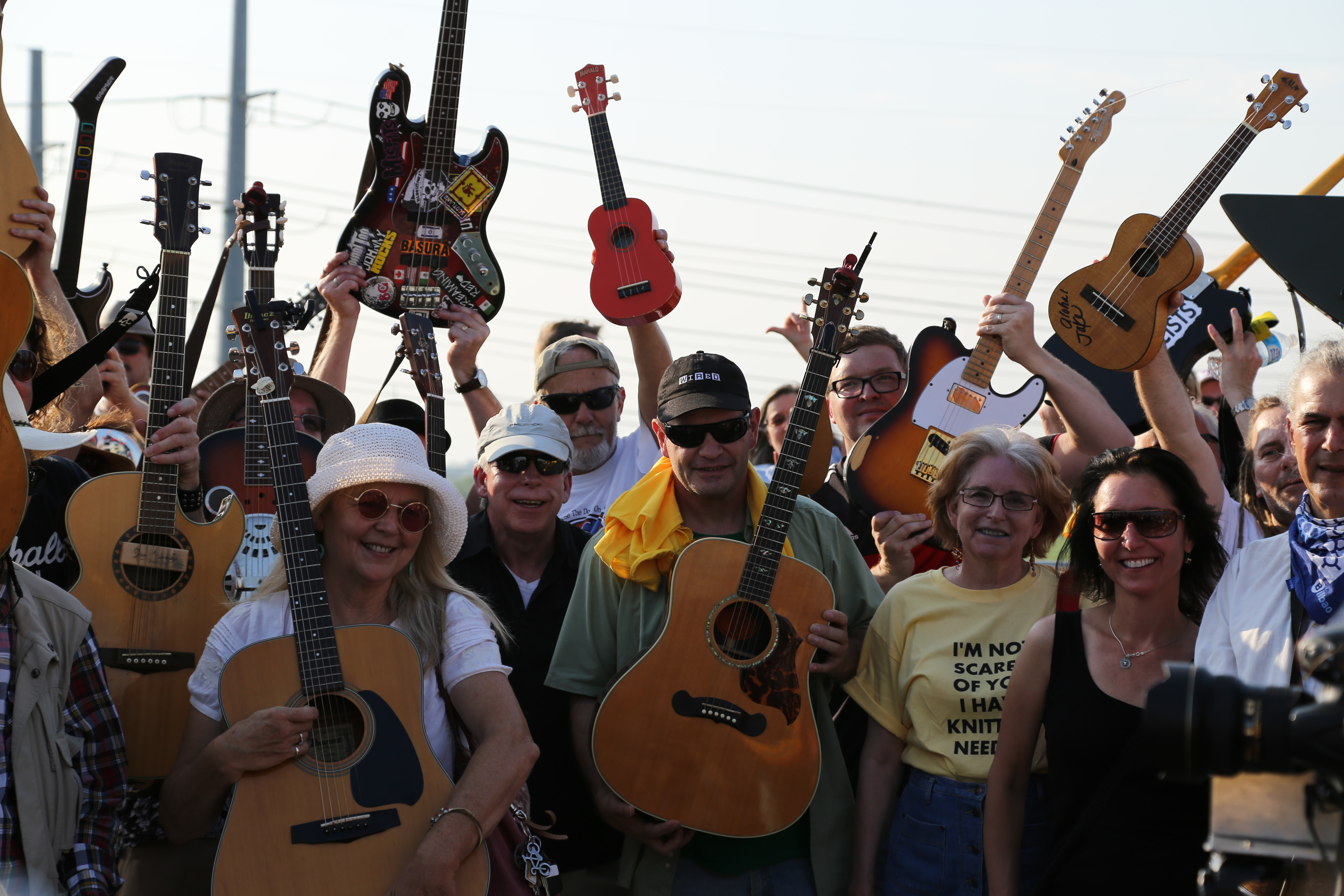
The first annual Open Carry Guitar Rally, July 4, 2014 in Dallas, Texas.

The original Open Carry Guitar Rally occurred on July 4, 2014, at the Continental Avenue Bridge Park in Dallas, Texas. This event was conceived and coordinated by Barry Kooda, co-coordinated by Kyle Reynolds, and promoted by graphic designer Pat Ramseur with event coordination assistance from Mike Schwedler and Reid Robinson. Over 1,000 people RSVP'ed on the group's Facebook page.

The event was continued in 2015, 2016, and 2017 as well. Next one is October 27, 2019.

=== Cleveland, Ohio ===
Inspired by the Dallas event, an open carry guitar rally was held on July 13, 2014, in Public Square in Cleveland, Ohio. This event was co-organized by Daniel McGraw and Ariel Clayton.

=== Fresno, California ===
On August 30, 2014, a group gathered at KJWL ("Jewel FM") radio station and exercised their right to bear guitars through the streets of downtown Fresno, California.

=== Austin, Texas ===
On August 30, 2014, a group assembled at the Texas State Capitol building in Austin in another iteration of the Open Carry Guitar Rally. This event was organized by Scott Carlin and attended by Dallas coordinators Barry Kooda and Kyle Reynolds.
