= WCEB =

WCEB may refer to:

- WCEB (FM), a radio station (94.7 FM) licensed to serve Deposit, New York, United States
- WCEB (Corning, New York), a radio station (91.9 FM) formerly licensed to serve Corning, New York, which operated from 1974 to 2022
