= Demos and Live Cuts Vol. II =

Compilation album by Michale Graves
- Released: 2007
- Recorded: 2002–2006
- Genre: Punk
- Length: 30:37

Michale Graves chronology
Demos and Live Cuts Vol. I (2007)	Demos and Live Cuts Vol. II (2007)	Illusions with Damien Echols (2007)

Demos and Live Cuts Vol. II is the second compilation album by Michale Graves. The album features rare demos and songs written from 2002-2006, including original demo versions of Return To Earth material.

== Track listings ==
No.	Title	Length
1.	"Walk Me Thru the Graveyard"	0:36
2.	"Shoelace (9-11-01)"	3:21
3.	"Butchershop ("Bay Ave" Demo)"	3:04
4.	"One Moment Away (Original Demo)"	3:11
5.	"Return to Earth (Original Demo)"	2:44
6.	"Air Superiority (Demo)"	1:25
7.	"Monster (Original Demo)"	2:58
8.	"Nobody Thinks About Me (Original Demo)"	2:11
9.	"House (Original Demo)"	1:53
10.	"Whitelight (Toronto Sessions '99)"	3:37
11.	"All the Cars Behind Me (Original Demo)"	3:09
12.	"Sometimes the Buildings Cry (Original Demo)"	2:28
Total length:		30:37
