= Demos and Live Cuts Vol. III =

Compilation album by Michale Graves
- Released: 2008
- Recorded: August 8, 2002
- Genre: Horror punk, punk, heavy metal
- Length: 71:48

Michale Graves chronology
Illusions (2007)	Demos and Live Cuts Vol. III (2008)	Illusions Live/Viretta Park (2008)

Demos and Live Cuts Vol. III is the third compilation album by former Misfits vocalist Michale Graves. It features songs from a 2002 live performance in New Jersey.

== Track listing ==
No.	Title	Length
1.	"Casket"	2:23
2.	"Blackbird"	1:51
3.	"One Million Light Years from Her"	3:05
4.	"Die Monster Die"	2:08
5.	"Groundzero NYC"	2:00
6.	"Wasting"	1:58
7.	"Hate the Living, Love the Dead"	1:29
8.	"Witch Hunt"	1:22
9.	"Lost in Space"	2:38
10.	"Weeds"	7:34
11.	"Fiend Without a Face"	2:31
12.	"Mort D'amour"	2:10
13.	"Speak of the Devil"	2:27
14.	"Spiderman"	2:32
15.	"Crying on Saturday Night"	3:40
16.	"The Haunting"	1:34
17.	"Attack of the Butterflies"	2:54
18.	"Shoelace"	3:27
19.	"White Light"	2:51
20.	"Tell Me"	1:35
21.	"So Don't You Know"	1:57
22.	"Dig Up Her Bones"	2:50
23.	"Ophelia"	5:42
24.	"Resurrection"	1:39
25.	"Creo Burn"	3:35
26.	"You Awful Me"	3:56
Total length:		71:48
