= Scream! (Misfits song) =

"Scream"

Single by the Misfits

from the album Famous Monsters
- Released: September 1999
- Recorded: April 1999
- Genre: Punk rock
- Length: 2:34
- Label: Roadrunner
- Songwriter(s): Michale Graves, Jerry Only, Doyle Wolfgang von Frankenstein, Dr. Chud
- Producer(s): Daniel Rey

Misfits singles chronology
| "I Wanna Be a NY Ranger" (1998) | "Scream" (1999) | "Monster Mash" (1999) |

Audio sample
- Scream!: file; help

"Scream" is the ninth single by the horror punk band the Misfits, and the first single released from their 1999 album Famous Monsters. The music video for the song was directed by George A. Romero, famous for his Living Dead series of zombie films.

== Background ==
"Scream" was written in a parking lot in Seattle while the Misfits were on tour. The band had learned that director Wes Craven was interested in using Misfits songs for his film Wishmaster, but instead they decided to submit a song for the upcoming Scream 2. They recorded a demo version of the song at a studio in Phoenix, Arizona. Singer Michale Graves described this early version as having a Peter Murphy influence. The demo was submitted to Craven but was not used for the film.

"Scream" was later re-recorded for the band's 1999 album Famous Monsters. This version had a slightly different arrangement than the demo version. It was released as the album's only single at the choosing of Roadrunner Records. The band later stated in the Cuts from the Crypt liner notes that they "never felt it was the strongest choice for either the single nor the corresponding music video that followed."

== Music video ==
The music video was directed by George A. Romero, famous for his Living Dead film series. Bassist Jerry Only has expressed admiration for Romero, calling Night of the Living Dead "still to this day one of the scariest movies ever made." At the time Romero was in Toronto filming Bruiser and needed a band to perform during the film's final murder scene. The Misfits agreed to perform in the film and to record two songs for the soundtrack in exchange for Romero directing their "Scream" video. According to Only, "It was an even trade, we shook hands and the deal was done. Business complications soon followed and I became very unhappy with my record label and my publishing company." No soundtrack was issued for Bruiser. The Misfits' two songs, "Fiend Without a Face" and "Bruiser", along with the demo version of "Scream", were released in 2001 on the compilation album Cuts from the Crypt.

The "Scream" music video consists of black-and-white footage of the band members as zombies terrorizing a hospital along with a number of Misfits fans, interspersed with color footage of the band performing live. A promotional VHS version of the video was included for free with the purchase of a set of Misfits action figures from 21st Century toys in 1999 and 2000. The video was also included in an enhanced CD-ROM portion of Cuts from the Crypt in 2001.

== Track listing ==
| No. | Title | Writer(s) | Length |
|---|---|---|---|
| 1. | "Scream" | Michale Graves, Jerry Only, Doyle Wolfgang von Frankenstein, Dr. Chud | 2:34 |
| Total length: | | | 2:34 |

== Personnel ==
- Michale Graves – vocals
- Jerry Only – bass guitar
- Doyle Wolfgang von Frankenstein – guitar
- Dr. Chud – drums

== See also ==
- Misfits discography
