= Illusions Live / Viretta Park =

Illusions Live/Viretta Park

Live album / EP by Michale Graves
- Released: October 2008
- Recorded: April/July 2008
- Genre: Punk, rock, acoustic
- Length: 72:33
- Label: Screaming Crow
- Producer: Michale Graves

Michale Graves chronology
Demos and Live Cuts Vol. III (2007)	Illusions Live/Viretta Park (2008)	Arkansas Sessions (2008)

Professional ratings
Review scores
Source	Rating
Live-Metal.net	

Illusions Live/Viretta Park is a combination live album and demo EP by Michale Graves. It was recorded on April 24, 2008 at club Bourbon in New Port Richie, Florida and July 8 and 9, 2008 in Bucharest, Romania, respectively.

== Track listing ==
No.	Title	Length
1.	"Blackbird"	2:22
2.	"Fiend Club"	2:38
3.	"Almost Home"	3:04
4.	"Beware"	3:23
5.	"Gorch"	3:08
6.	"Butchershop"	2:51
7.	"Ophelia"	4:07
8.	"Shining"	3:45
9.	"Lucifer I Am"	2:18
10.	"Wormwood"	2:58
11.	"Casket"	3:18
12.	"You Awful Me"	2:38
13.	"One Million Light Years from Her"	2:33
14.	"Frost Bite"	3:11
15.	"Nothing"	2:32
16.	"Scream"	3:20
17.	"Crying on Saturday Night"	4:57
18.	"Blackbird (Romania Demo)"	2:31
19.	"The Best of Me (Romania Demo)"	3:35
20.	"A Generation Coming Down (Romania Demo)"	2:12
21.	"Locked Away (Romania Demo)"	3:30
22.	"The Eternal Haunting (Romania Demo)"	5:29
23.	"Viretta Park (Romania Demo)"	2:13
Total length:		72:33

== Info ==
- Audio CD (October 21, 2008)
- Original release date: October 21, 2008
- Number of discs: 1
- Format: Live
- Label: Screaming Crow
