= Illusions (Michale Graves album) =

Studio album by Michale Graves and Damien Echols
- Released: October 30, 2007
- Recorded: 2007
- Genre: Alternative rock, acoustic, punk
- Length: 46:01
- Label: SOS Records

Michale Graves and Damien Echols chronology
Demos and Live Cuts Vol. II (2007)	Illusions (2007)	Demos and Live Cuts Vol. III (2008)

Illusions is the third solo album by former Misfits vocalist Michale Graves. It is a collaborative album which Graves co-wrote with Damien Echols, who at the time was on death row. Echols was one of the West Memphis Three. The album was produced in part due to an early example of a successful crowdfunding campaign, and the contributors' names are printed inside the CD booklet.

== Track listing ==
No.	Title	Length
1.	"The Blackness and the Forest"	2:19
2.	"Almost Home"	2:14
3.	"Teenage Monster"	1:56
4.	"Frostbite"	3:24
5.	"Wormwood"	3:11
6.	"Nothing"	3:03
7.	"1000 Cracks of Daylight"	3:51
8.	"Gorch"	3:10
9.	"Lucifer I Am"	2:37
10.	"Where the Sky Ends"	3:56
11.	"Shelter"	2:36
12.	"Dig Up Her Bones"	4:50
13.	"Crying on Saturday Night (Live at CBGB's NYC March 2006)"	3:58
14.	"When We Were Angels"	3:06
15.	"Silent Partner"	1:50
Total length:		46:01
