= SiriusXM Patriot =

- Broadcast area: United States; Canada
- Frequency: Sirius XM 125
- Branding: Patriot

Programming
- Format: Conservative talk radio

Ownership
- Owner: Sirius XM Radio

History
- First air date: July 2004

Technical information
- Class: Satellite radio station

Links
- Website: www.siriusxm.com/siriusxmpatriot

SiriusXM Patriot is a conservative talk radio channel on Sirius Satellite Radio channel 125 and XM Satellite Radio channel 125 . The channel features exclusive hosts such as Mike Slater (Breitbart News Daily), David Webb, Andrew Wilkow, and Stacy Washington. It also features popular syndicated programs including Sean Hannity and Mark Levin. The station is the result of a merger between former channels SIRIUS Patriot and America Right. Hourly news updates (aired at the top of each programming hour) are produced by Townhall.

== History of Sirius Patriot ==
Logo for SIRIUS Patriot, the second conservative talk channel on Sirius.

SIRIUS Patriot was initially launched in July 2004 as a companion to the now defunct SIRIUS Right, which was dropped in 2006 in favor of the Fox News Talk channel. Patriot launched with a lineup including Geoff Metcalf, Laura Ingraham, Bob Dornan, Cam Edwards, Joseph Farah’s Worldnet Daily, Michael Reagan, and The Pentagon Channel overnights. The following year, Sirius added exclusive hosts Mike Church to late mornings and Andrew Wilkow to afternoons. Cam & Company was moved to nights.

In 2006 and 2007, the Patriot lineup underwent many changes as conservative talk channels SIRIUS Right and ABC News & Talk were deleted. The channel added Bill Bennett's Morning in America program to mornings after Sirius Right was removed. Patriot absorbed both Sean Hannity and Mark Levin, moving Andrew Wilkow to midday and eventually removing Michael Reagan from the lineup.

In 2015, the Mike Church morning drive program was cancelled and replaced by Breitbart News Daily. In addition, the TheBlaze Radio News, which produced news updates at the top and bottom of each hour, was replaced with Townhall.com.

Sirius Canada added the channel in the summer of 2008 (along with the now-defunct Hot Jamz and SIRIUS Left). The channel did not join the XM Satellite Radio lineup on November 12, 2008, like many Sirius channels.

== History of America Right ==
America Right, originally known as Buzz XM, launched in 2001 under the control of Clear Channel, which kept it until March 2006.

=== Buzz XM (2001–2004) ===
Buzz XM started off on channel 166 during the launch of XM, and carried shows including The Phil Hendrie Show, The David Lawrence Show, Bill Handel, Matt Drudge, The Glenn Beck Program, Bill Cunningham, and The John and Ken Show. Many of these programs originated from KFI in Los Angeles, California, especially on the weekends. Since it was a Clear Channel satellite station, the lineup was dominated mainly by Clear Channel programming. Also, since XM had less than a million subscribers at the time, there wasn't a lot of concern over how local Los Angeles some of the programs were. Nonetheless, Buzz XM went on for a few years without any big problems, like the ones its sister Extreme XM suffered from.

There was one casualty, albeit a minor one on Saturday nights. The clinical sex talk show Sex with Dr. Natasha which aired Saturday nights from 11 p.m. to 2 a.m. ET was pulled from the air in March 2004 as a reaction to the Super Bowl and the Federal Communications Commission (FCC) crackdown on indecency. The show was syndicated on terrestrial AM and FM radio, but was never cited nor fined by the FCC. The only incident coming close to this was when Dr. Natasha appeared on another talk show. Complaints were filed, but the FCC rejected them, claiming that the show's sex talk was for clinical purposes, not obscene ones. Still, Clear Channel cancelled the show entirely and it was removed from any and all affiliates, including Buzz XM.

==== Conservative talk focus begins ====
Over time, the channel slowly began to become a bit more conservative focused. With XM launching a new channel for left-leaning talk shows, it looked as if Buzz XM would be a good choice to reformat, and so it was.

=== America Right (2004–2010) ===
Logo for America Right.

The channel was renamed "America Right" in April 2004, and was retailored to include only conservative and Republican talk shows; though many of these shows were already on the lineup beforehand. Non-conservative hosts, such as Phil Hendrie and David Lawrence, were absorbed by Extreme XM. Some of the shows added to the America Right lineup included Rusty Humphries, Michael Savage and Michael Reagan. At the same time, the Air America Radio channel, was created for liberal talk programming, mostly from the Air America Radio network.

==== Michael Savage leaves ====
In March 2005, America Right talker Michael Savage stated that satellite radio should be censored by the Federal Communications Commission. Savage claimed that his lawyers were working on getting him off of both satellite services because he didn't want to be associated with the type of talk presented by hosts who frequently use obscene language. His show, "The Savage Nation" left the XM and Sirius lineups the following week.

In late 2005, after more lineup shuffling, Dr. Laura was added to America Right. Her presence on America Right was considered out of place by some listeners, as her show promotes conservative values, but is not political in nature.

==== XM takes control ====
In May 2006, Clear Channel decided to return the channel back to XM Satellite Radio. Several changes were made to America Right's lineup, including the swapping and shuffling of shows with sister station Talk Radio, still programmed by Clear Channel. Glenn Beck exchanged slots with G. Gordon Liddy's program. Matt Drudge's weekend program was also added, and The Wall Street Journal's hours were extended. America Right also debuted a show in the 1-5 a.m. slot, Advice Line with Roy Masters.

After sixteen months of a stable lineup, America Right announced in September 2007 that Dr. Laura would be moving to Take 5 to make room for Sean Hannity and Mark Davis, who were previously on the now-discontinued ABC News & Talk channel.

==== Controversy over advertorial ====
On September 15, 2007, America Right aired the first installment of Real Estate Wealth Myths Facts and Strategies, a brokered program featuring Fredric Dryer and Gary Eldred. The program was sponsored by Convergent Acquisitions and Development Inc. - a company that acquires rental properties for investors. The show was pulled after one show upon learning Dryer was indicted on 67 felony charges, including theft to securities, and fraud. XM spokesman Nathaniel Brown said XM pulled the show because it was "not aware of the legal issues surrounding one of the personalities that Convergent chose to use for the advertorials." He also added, "The advertorial aired once and it won't air again."

==== Merger effects ====
In February 2009, Andrew Wilkow's program was added to mid-days on America Right, which moved Laura Ingraham to a live slot and bumped G. Gordon Liddy off the weekday lineup. His show became a weekend best-of show. In addition, Mike Church was added to a tape delayed timeslot from midnight to 3 a.m. Eastern. To make room for sports preemptions, much of America Right's weekend programming wound up on sister channel Sirius XM Stars Too, as well as Clear Channel controlled America's Talk.

== SIRIUS XM Patriot (2010–) ==
On May 12, 2010, Sirius XM announced that The Glenn Beck Radio Program would be added to a newly merged SIRIUS XM Patriot channel. This would be the first time a program produced by Clear Channel Communications would be heard on a Sirius XM produced channel. As a result, Mike Church's show was moved to morning drive, and the Rusty Humphries show, heard on America Right at the time, would move to overnights. The channel now features a live lineup from 6am to midnight Eastern time.

== Lineup ==
NOTE: Programming is subject to preemption by special events.

=== Weekdays ===
ET	PT	Show	Network	Notes
12 a.m.	9 p.m.	The Mark Levin Show	Westwood One	Replay
3 a.m.	12 a.m.	The Wilkow Majority with Andrew Wilkow	Sirius XM Radio	Replay
5 a.m.	2 a.m.	The Fox News Rundown	Fox News Radio	Live
6 a.m.	3 a.m.	Breitbart News Daily with Mike Slater	Sirius XM Radio	Live
9 a.m.	6 a.m.	The David Webb Show	Sirius XM Radio	Live
12 p.m.	9 a.m.	The Wilkow Majority with Andrew Wilkow	Sirius XM Radio	Live
3 p.m.	12 p.m.	The Sean Hannity Show	Premiere Networks	Live
6 p.m.	3 p.m.	The Mark Levin Show	Westwood One	Live
9 p.m.	6 p.m.	Stacy on the Right with Stacy Washington	Sirius XM Radio	Live

- Source: SiriusXM

=== Saturday ===
ET	PT	Show	Network	Notes
12 a.m.	9 p.m.	The Mark Levin Show	Westwood One	Replay
3 a.m.	12 a.m.	The Wilkow Majority with Andrew Wilkow	Sirius XM Radio	Replay
6 a.m.	3 a.m.	The Best of The David Webb Show	Sirius XM Radio	Best-of
9 a.m.	6 a.m.	Just the News Radio with John Solomon	Bentley Media Group	Pre-recorded
10 a.m.	7 a.m.	Breitbart News Weekend	Sirius XM Radio	Live
1 p.m.	10 a.m.	Sonnie's Corner with Sonnie Johnson	Sirius XM Radio	Live
3 p.m.	12 p.m.	The Best of The Brian Kilmeade Show	Fox News Radio	Best-of
6 p.m.	3 p.m.	The Best of The Sean Hannity Show	Premiere Networks	Best-of
9 p.m.	6 p.m.	The Best of The David Webb Show	Sirius XM Radio	Best-of

- Source: SiriusXM

=== Sunday ===
ET	PT	Show	Network	Notes
12 a.m.	9 p.m.	The Wilkow Majority with Andrew Wilkow	Sirius XM Radio	Replay
3 a.m.	12 a.m.	The Best of The David Webb Show	Sirius XM Radio	Best-of
6 a.m.	3 a.m.	Breitbart News Weekend	Sirius XM Radio	Replay
9 a.m.	6 a.m.	Stacy on the Right with Stacy Washington	Sirius XM Radio	Replay
10 a.m.	7 a.m.	Just the News Radio with John Solomon	Bentley Media Group	Replay
12 p.m.	9 a.m.	The Wilkow Majority with Andrew Wilkow	Sirius XM Radio	Replay
2 p.m.	11 a.m.	Sonnie's Corner with Sonnie Johnson	Sirius XM Radio	Replay
4 p.m.	1 p.m.	The Best of The Sean Hannity Show	Premiere Networks	Best-of
7 p.m.	4 p.m.	Breitbart News: Sunday Edition	Sirius XM Radio	Live
10 p.m.	7 p.m.	Just the News Radio with John Solomon	Bentley Media Group	Replay

- Source: SiriusXM

== See also ==
- SIRIUS XM Patriot Plus
