= KVOU-FM =

Currently silent
- Uvalde, Texas; United States
- Broadcast area: Uvalde County
- Frequency: 104.9 MHz

Ownership
- Owner: Javier Navarro Galindo
- Sister stations: KUVA, KBNU

History
- First air date: 1976
- Former call signs: KYUF (1976–2001)
- Former frequencies: 95.3 MHz (1976–2001)

Technical information
- Licensing authority: FCC
- Facility ID: 69621
- Class: C3
- ERP: 25,000 watts
- HAAT: 83 meters (272 ft)
- Transmitter coordinates: 29°11′16″N 99°46′37″W

Links
- Public license information: Public file; LMS

KVOU-FM (104.9 FM) is a radio station licensed to Uvalde, Texas, United States. The station is owned by Javier Navarro Galindo.

On June 29, 2022, KVOU-FM ceased operations.
