= KJFX =

Coordinates: 36.949°N 119.487°W

- Fresno, California; United States
- Broadcast area: Fresno metropolitan area
- Frequency: 95.7 MHz
- Branding: 95.7 The Fox

Programming
- Format: Classic rock
- Affiliations: Westwood One

Ownership
- Owner: John & Katie Ostlund; (One Putt Broadcasting)
- Sister stations: KFRR, KJWL, KWDO

History
- First air date: May 15, 1970
- Former call signs: KYNO-FM (1970–1972, 1977–1990); KPHD (1972–1977)
- Former frequencies: 95.5 MHz (1970–1984)
- Call sign meaning: Fox

Technical information
- Licensing authority: FCC
- Facility ID: 65773
- Class: B
- ERP: 17,500 watts
- HAAT: 259 meters (850 ft)

Links
- Public license information: Public file; LMS
- Webcast: Listen live
- Website: 957thefox.com

KJFX (95.7 FM) is a commercial radio station licensed to Fresno, California, United States, serving the Fresno metropolitan area. Owned by One Putt Broadcasting, KJFX airs a classic rock format branded as "95.7 The Fox", with studios located at 1415 Fulton Street in downtown Fresno.

The transmitter is sited off California State Route 168 in Humphreys Station. KJFX broadcasts using HD Radio technology.

== History ==
=== KYNO-FM ===
The origin of this station goes back to legendary radio owner, Gene Chenault. He already owned KYNO 1300 AM (now KWRU). It played Top 40 hits, using a format known as "Boss Radio" and was popular among the young people of Fresno. The FCC granted it a construction permit in 1970 for an FM station at 95.5 MHz. The call sign would be KYNO-FM.

The station signed on the air on May 15, 1970. The first format on KYNO-FM was the automated "Hit Parade '70" playing the softer songs from the current Top 40 and some recent hits. The radio syndication company, Drake-Chenault, with Gene Chenault as a key executive, provided the FM station's programming.

=== Rock and Disco ===
In 1972, the station's call letters changed to KPHD but they went back to KYNO-FM in 1977. The format switched to album oriented rock (AOR), branded as "Rock 96 FM".

In 1978, the disco music sound was becoming very popular. KYNO-FM flipped to all-disco in response. KYNO-FM moved from 95.5 to 95.7 MHz in 1984. Also in the 1980s, the format was changed to Top 40 branded as "96 FM" to compete with rival contemporary stations 94.9 KBOS and 103.7 KMGX. In the late 1980s, the branding was changed to "Hot 96".

=== Classic Rock ===
In February 1990, the format flipped to a classic rock with a change to its present call letters, KJFX. The FX stands for "Fox", the station's mascot. At that time, KJFX was owned by Wilks Broadcasting.

On Tuesday, November 25, 2014, KJFX and sister stations KFRR and KJZN were purchased by One Putt Broadcasting from Wilks Broadcasting. On January 30, 2015, the purchase was consummated.

Today, "95.7 The Fox" is a popular music station with adult men in Central California, despite a crowded radio market. In morning drive time, the station carries the syndicated Bob and Tom Show from Indianapolis. Also heard on KJFX are Kacy Allen, Koyote, Jeff Mora, Big Dog and the syndicated Pink Floyd weekend program "Floydian Slip."
