= Andrew Wilkow =

American radio host

- Born: Andrew Steven Wilkow; August 18, 1972 (age 54); Hollywood, Florida
- Education: University of Florida
- Occupation: Conservative political talk radio host
- Height: 5 ft 5 in (165 cm)

Andrew Steven Wilkow (born August 18, 1972) is a conservative political talk radio host on the Sirius XM Patriot channel, specifically on SIRIUS channel 125 and XM channel 125. Until July 2006, Wilkow had been on WGY in Schenectady, New York, (weekday mornings) and WABC in New York City (Sunday mornings). Wilkow is also a contributor to the website Conservative Punk. He also has a television show on TheBlaze.

== Early career ==
Wilkow was raised in the Long Island town of Bellmore, New York. Wilkow's interest in radio began during his freshman year of college at SUNY Delhi at the college's campus station, WDTU.

Before entering talk radio in 2002, he had stints as a disc jockey at WCLG-FM in Morgantown, West Virginia, (as "Andrew Steele") and at WMRQ in Hartford, Connecticut (as "Wilkow"). Wilkow became a regular Sunday morning host at WABC while keeping his air shift at WMRQ. When WMRQ switched format from alternative rock to hip hop, he moved into talk radio full-time when he filled the 5-7 p.m. shift on WGY in October 2003. After becoming a ratings success, Wilkow moved to the 9-11:40 a.m. slot in May 2005, replacing Glenn Beck, when WGY wanted to clear the third hour of Sean Hannity. At WGY, Wilkow became known for being a vocal rival of the Democratic party in Albany.

In June 2006, Wilkow announced his departure from both WGY and WABC in order to host a talk show on Sirius Satellite Radio; his last show on WGY was July 14, and his last show on WABC was on July 30. Since August 9, 2006, Wilkow has hosted his own program on the Sirius Patriot channel on Sirius Satellite radio, The Wilkow Majority. The advertising for the program claims it is rooted in "one thing and one thing only, and that is rational thought."

== Current career ==
Wilkow currently hosts a three-hour session beginning at 9 A.M. West/12 P.M. East Monday-Friday, with replays after Rusty Humphries in the evenings and on weekends. He frequently appeared as a panelist on TheBlaze internet program Real News from the Blaze. Wilkow joined TheBlaze in a new show called Wilkow!

On June 27, 2014, Wilkow announced through social media that he would no longer be hosting Wilkow! on The Blaze. On his radio program airing that same day, Wilkow cited the reason for his desire to spend more time with his children.

Wilkow appears in Attack of Life: The Bang Tango Movie, a 2016 documentary film about 80s hard rock band Bang Tango, directed by Drew Fortier.

On January 31, 2018, Andrew Wilkow started hosting a new version of Wilkow on CRTV, which would merge with TheBlaze to form BlazeTV later in 2018. The beginning of Wilkow's show contains the same opening spiel as his radio show, with Wilkow stating that he is a patriot first, conservative second, republican third.

== Personal life ==
On July 14, 2007, Wilkow married Brittany, the daughter of WABC program director, Phil Boyce.
