= Mike Church =

American radio host

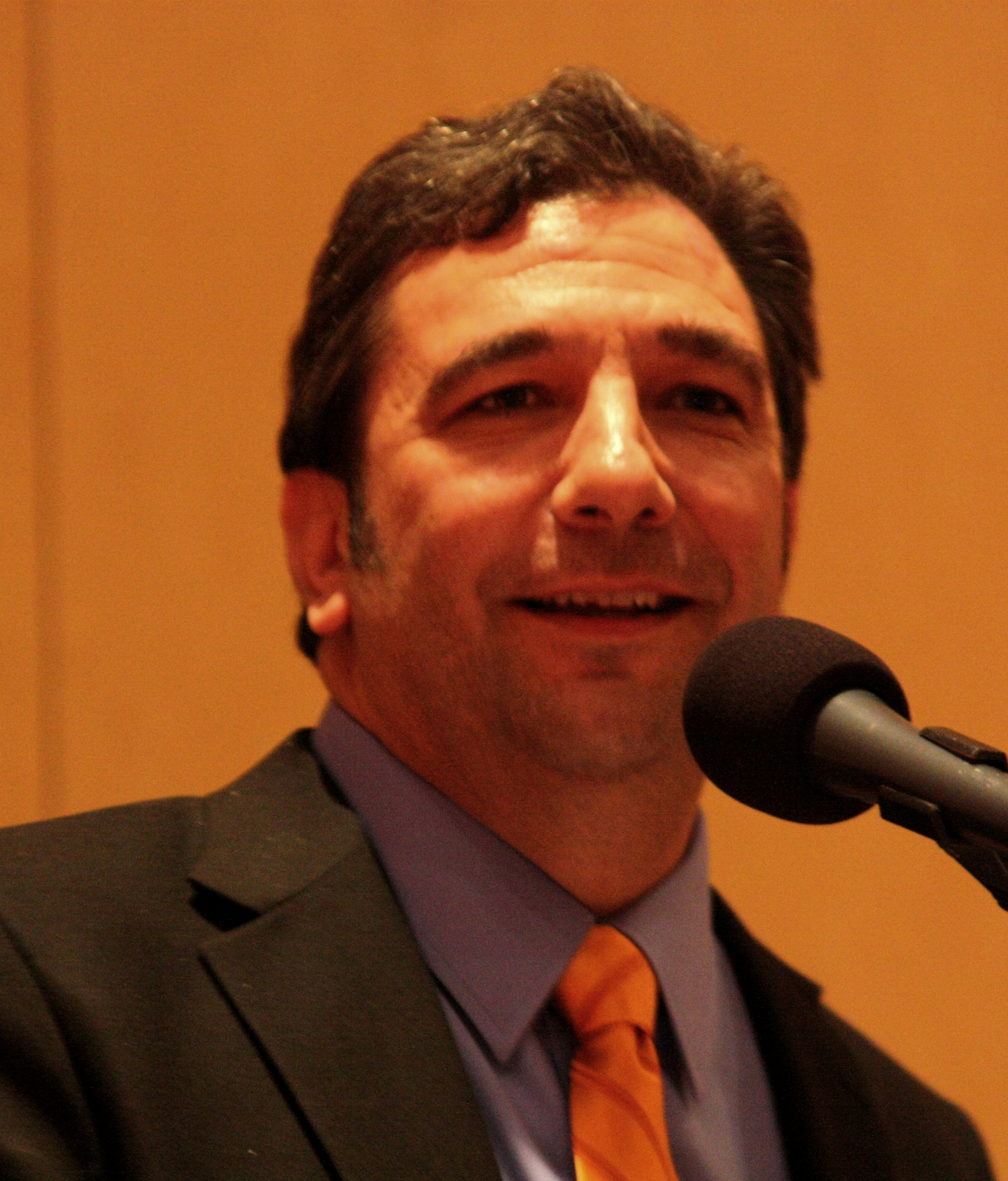
- Born: 1962 (age 63–64); United States
- Occupation: Radio talk show host
- Website: www.mikechurch.com

Mike Church (born 1962) is an American radio and internet talk show host and singer/songwriter.

The Mike Church Show was the first-ever produced talk show on Sirius Satellite Radio (now SiriusXM Radio). Prior to its cancellation in October 2015, Church's show was the longest-running program on satellite radio. His final live show on Sirius XM aired on the morning of Tuesday, October 27, 2015. In 2011 Michael Dougherty, writing for The American Conservative, called Church "the most radical man on the radio".

Church also created original conservative-themed parody songs, which include "Manuel Went Down To Georgia," "There's Democrats Somewhere"; "Obama," a take on the Toto song "Rosanna"; and "Mr. Jefferson", a rendition of the Simon & Garfunkel song "Mrs. Robinson".

His show was aired on SIRIUS XM Patriot, SIRIUS and XM channel 125 Monday through Friday from 6:00 am – 9:00 am Eastern Time Zone. Shows were generally aired live, with an occasional rebroadcast of a previous show. The show was also later rebroadcast on SIRIUS XM Patriot Plus, SIRIUS 816, and XM 138 (online only) from 12 midnight to 3 am. His show was broadcast live from self-supported studios in Mandeville, Louisiana, a suburb of New Orleans.

The Mike Church Band was a part of the show, which provided conservative-themed parody songs as comedic elements to the sociocultural topics of discussion, most of which were aimed at the political left. Headed up by Mike Church, the band has released albums including UnAmerican Idiots (2005), Libs on the Run (2007), and The White Album (2008).

Church is also the author, producer, and voice talent behind three documentaries:

- Road to Independence – the story of the United States Declaration of Independence;
- The Fame of Our Fathers: How Immortality Inspired Our Constitution;
- Spirit of '76 – writing and ratifying the U.S. Constitution.

The three documentaries, taken from source material, including personal letters, notes, and transcripts of debates, portrayed the Founding Fathers in their own words. The first two projects were originally audio-only documentaries, while Spirit of '76 is animated. Church has also adapted Road to Independence into an animated feature.

Following the cancellation of his show on satellite radio, Church formed a new streaming online service, Veritas Radio Network, which carries a new version of his program and content from other hosts. The new network and programming launched on Wednesday, November 11, 2015.
