= KEPS =

Radio station in Eagle Pass, Texas (1957–2022)

- Eagle Pass, Texas; United States
- Frequency: 1270 kHz

Programming
- Format: Defunct

Ownership
- Owner: Javier Navarro Galindo; (South Texas Radio, LLC)
- Sister stations: KINL

History
- First air date: 1957
- Last air date: June 29, 2022 (License canceled on December 5, 2023)
- Call sign meaning: "Eagle Pass"

Technical information
- Licensing authority: FCC
- Facility ID: 18107
- Class: D
- Power: 890 watts (day); 32 watts (night)
- Transmitter coordinates: 28°43′57″N 100°29′34″W

Links
- Public license information: Public file; LMS

KEPS (1270 AM) was a radio station licensed to serve Eagle Pass, Texas, United States. The station was owned by Javier Navarro Galindo, through licensee South Texas Radio, LLC.

Until June 29, 2022, KEPS broadcast a Spanish Contemporary music format. The station also broadcast local news, sports, plus CNN en Español newscasts. The station ceased operations on June 29, 2022, with its license cancelation coming in 2023.

== History ==
KEPS was on air since 1957. It was initially owned by Uvalde Broadcasters and was sold in 1964 to Eagle Pass Broadcasters, both in the Harpole family. Texrock Radio bought the station in early 1998.

In 2013, Rhattigan Broadcasting sold KEPS and KINL to MBM Eagle Pass Radio, a subsidiary of R Communications.

On June 29, 2022, KEPS ceased operations. The Federal Communications Commission cancelled the station's license on December 5, 2023.
