= Cuts from the Crypt =

Cuts From the Crypt

Compilation album by Misfits
- Released: October 30, 2001
- Genre: Horror punk; heavy metal; hardcore punk
- Length: 47:55
- Label: Roadrunner

Misfits chronology
Famous Monsters (1999)	Cuts From the Crypt (2001)	Project 1950 (2003)

Professional ratings
Review scores
Source	Rating
Allmusic	2.5/5 stars
Ultimate Guitar	8.3/10 stars

Cuts From the Crypt is a collection of demos, formerly unreleased tracks and cover songs by the American horror punk band Misfits. All the album's tracks were recorded by the band in the years following their reformation without original singer Glenn Danzig. The enhanced version also contains the music video for the song "Scream!".

== Track listing ==
No.	Title	Writer(s)	From	Length
1.	"Dead Kings Rise" (demo version)	Jerry Only	Mars Attacks Demos	2:55
2.	"Blacklight" (demo version)	Michale Graves	Mars Attacks Demos	1:29
3.	"The Haunting" (demo version)	Only, Graves, Doyle Wolfgang von Frankenstein, Dr. Chud	Mars Attacks Demos	1:35
4.	"The Hunger" (demo version)	Only, Graves, Doyle, Chud	Mars Attacks Demos	1:41
5.	"Mars Attacks" (demo version)	Only	Mars Attacks Demos	2:19
6.	"Dr. Phibes Rises Again" (demo version)	Only, Doyle	Mars Attacks Demos	6:52
7.	"I Got a Right" (originally performed by The Stooges)	Iggy Pop	We Will Fall: The Iggy Pop Tribute	3:00
8.	"Monster Mash" (originally performed by Bobby (Boris) Pickett and the Crypt-Kickers)	Bobby Pickett, Leonard L. Capizzi	"Monster Mash"	2:38
9.	"I Wanna Be a NY Ranger"	John Cafiero	"I Wanna Be a NY Ranger"	1:38
10.	"Scream" (demo version)	Only, Graves, Doyle, Chud	previously unreleased	3:33
11.	"1,000,000 Years B.C."	Only	Famous Monsters sessions	2:19
12.	"Helena 2"	Graves, Doyle	Famous Monsters sessions	3:22
13.	"Devil Doll"	Doyle, Graves	Famous Monsters sessions	3:14
14.	"Fiend Without a Face"	Graves	Bruiser	3:00
15.	"Bruiser"	Only	Bruiser	2:27
16.	"No More Moments"	Lyrics: Graves, Doyle, Don Oriolo Jr. Music: Doyle, Oriolo	Campfire Stories	3:08
17.	"Rise Above" (live; originally performed by Black Flag)	Greg Ginn	previously unreleased	2:44
Total length:				47:55

== Personnel ==
=== Band ===
- Michale Graves – vocals, backing vocals on "Monster Mash"
- Jerry Only – bass, backing vocals, lead vocals on "Monster Mash"
- Doyle Wolfgang von Frankenstein – guitar
- Dr. Chud – drums

=== Additional musicians ===
- John Cafiero – vocals on "I Wanna Be a NY Ranger"
- Dez Cadena – guitar and vocals on "Rise Above"
- Robo – drums on "Rise Above"
