= Michale Graves =

American singer (born 1975)

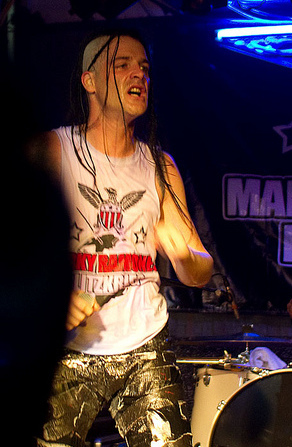
- Graves performing in 2010

Background information
- Born: Michael Emanuel; March 21, 1975 (age 51); Dumont, New Jersey, U.S.
- Genres: Horror punk; heavy metal
- Occupations: Singer; songwriter
- Years active: 1995–present
- Labels: Geffen; Roadrunner; GDU; Hydraulic/Vile of Venom; Horror High; SOS
- Formerly of: Graves; Misfits; Gotham Road

Michael Emanuel (born March 21, 1975), better known by his stage name Michale Graves, is an American singer. He is best known as the lead vocalist for the 1990s re-incarnation of the horror punk band Misfits from 1995 to 2000, leaving briefly in 1998. He has also released several albums as a solo artist.

== Life and career ==
=== Misfits ===
Graves was born and raised in Dumont, New Jersey. As a teenager Graves got his start singing for local punk acts, including Bambi Slam and Valmont, to little success. In 1995, he was recording a demo with his band the Mopes in Lodi, New Jersey, when their engineer, Bob Alecca, mentioned that the Misfits were reforming and holding auditions for a new singer. Being unfamiliar with the Misfits Graves bought the Collection I and Walk Among Us albums to familiarize himself with the band and became an official member about a year after trying out.

On November 1, 1997, Graves and the Misfits appeared on an episode on WCW Monday Nitro to help Vampiro win his match. He and the Misfits would appear on a few more televised events for the company however they would be let go soon after following Jerry Only’s attempt to unionize the wrestlers.

Graves took a hiatus from the band in 1998, during which Myke Itzazone of Empire Hideous filled in as singer during tours of South America and Europe. After Graves' return the band signed to Roadrunner Records, releasing Famous Monsters in October 1999. During a performance at the House of Blues in Orlando, Florida on October 25, 2000, Graves and drummer Dr. Chud both quit the band and walked off stage.

In September 2008, Graves confirmed that he would return to the Misfits if asked: "Jerry and I do not have a dysfunctional working relationship. Him and I both know and I know he knows that I am on board. It is a phone call away. I won't step back into what I walked away from, but the problem isn't with Jerry and I. The problem is with Doyle and with Chud."

On December 26, 2009, Graves appeared on stage with Doyle Wolfgang von Frankenstein and Dr. Chud's band Gorgeous Frankenstein at the Starland Ballroom in Sayreville, New Jersey, who was opening for Danzig. While on stage, the band (along with Graves on vocals) played four late-1990s-era Misfits songs ("Helena", "Lost in Space", "Scarecrow Man" and "Shining"), but they were cut short from playing "Dig Up Her Bones" due to time.

Graves' singing can be found on American Psycho, Famous Monsters, backup vocals on the 1999 single "Monster Mash", and "Cuts from the Crypt". He also wrote original songs for the band such as "Dig Up Her Bones", "American Psycho", "Scream!", "Saturday Night", "This Island Earth", "Fiend without a Face", "Shining", "The Haunting","Devil Doll", "Witch Hunt", and "Fiend Club".

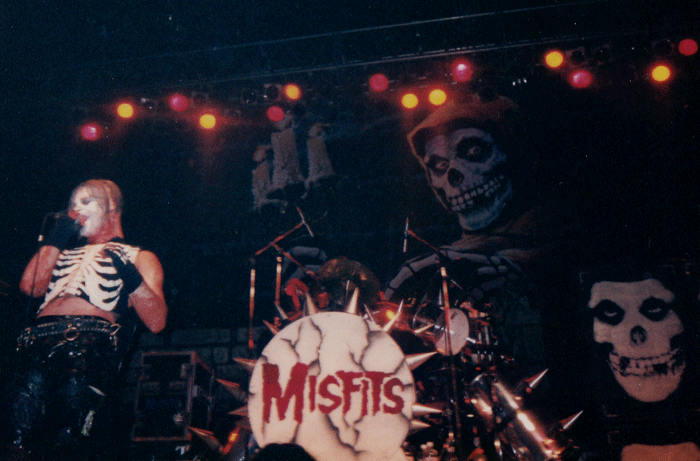
Graves (left) with the Misfits in 1998

=== Lost Boys ===
During a break in touring in 2000, Graves and Dr. Chud formed a band called The Lost Boys. They played two shows before the Misfits regrouped to embark on another tour, which was their last tour with this lineup. The first Lost Boys show consisted of Graves on an acoustic guitar and vocals while Dr. Chud played drums. They played Misfits songs they had written as well as songs later used for the band Graves which Graves wrote. The second show was the same music played as the first show, only this time the lineup consisted of Graves on vocals and electric guitar (he used Misfits guitarist Doyle's old Ibanez Iceman which was given to Graves as a gift upon joining the Misfits back in 1995), Dr. Chud on drums, and "J-Sin Trioxin" (Mister Monster) on bass. Later on as an encore set, J.V. Bastard (of Mister Monster, Gotham Road, Darrow Chemical Company, and Blitzkid) took the stage joining the band to play guitar as Graves sang. The four played a set of "classic" Misfits songs from the 1977–1983 era of the band.

=== Graves ===
After Graves and Dr. Chud's split with the Misfits on October 25, 2000, they formed the band Graves which made one album called Web of Dharma. Before the band finished writing songs, recording, touring and even solidifying a lineup, Graves rejoined the Misfits, but only as a guest vocalist for a month during the M25 kickoff tour. He would perform Misfits songs written during the time of his tenure with the band to raise money for his new project, Graves. During a two-day break on their Web of Dharma 2 tour, the band recorded what was to be new material for a second album in Ripsnorter Studios, located in Minneapolis, Minnesota. The studio is owned by members of the Minneapolis horror rock band Ripsnorter, who offered the band free studio time. The recordings were never finished due to disagreements between the mixing of the songs and have never officially been released. After two successful US tours and the verge of a breakout record contract, Graves dissolved due to differences between Graves and Dr. Chud, after only releasing one album.

=== Gotham Road ===
Graves formed Gotham Rd shortly after with Loki, JV Bastard and Paul Lifeless. Under the assumed name of Graves they recorded a five-song demo of redone Graves songs, three which were released on Web of Dharma and two other songs which had been written and demoed with the original Graves lineup but not officially released. Around this time is also when Graves announced via his website that he would begin producing other bands albums on his off time. One such band is Stressbomb from Connecticut who recorded their first album, Self Medicate, with Graves as producer and his drummer Quincy as engineer during January 2006. After a few months of the band practicing, they decided to change the band's name to Gotham Rd. They released one album before going on hiatus so Graves could join the U.S. Marines. His last show ever was to be on December 31, 2004. They went on two successful tours: 2003's Seasons of the Witch tour and 2004's Mourning Lights tour. Before their Mourning Lights tour, the band entered a studio to record three new songs they had written after their first tour. Out of the three songs, only one ("My Way") had been mixed. The only way it was available for listening was by requesting it on Seton Hall University's WSOU, Pirate Radio. Before going on indefinite hiatus they would play one-off shows in New Jersey when home from the Punk Rock Is Dead, Graves solo tour. Their second-to-last show to date was held at the now defunct Connections in Clifton, New Jersey, in March 2005. The band announced The Nightmare Rides Are Back all over the net and played a one-time-only reunion show in Belmar, New Jersey, at the Goodwill Fire Hall with Cryptovyrus, The Zombie Mafia, Morbid Visions, and Johnny B. Morbid. They played a mix of material from Graves' solo works, Graves re-records, and Gotham Road, as well as some Misfits songs written by Graves. In 2008 and 2009, the band contributed some songs to the German compilation CDs Get Acquainted Vol. 1 and Vol. 2.

=== Solo projects and beyond ===
==== 2005–2008 ====
Right before his leave for the Marines, Graves was approached by Horror High Records to do a solo album. He eventually recorded his debut solo record Punk Rock Is Dead in 2005. The entire album was written and recorded with friend and bandmate in Gotham Road, Paul Lifeless, on drums in only one month. After being honorably discharged due to a back injury, Graves went to embark on a tour in support of the album with Loki, JV Bastard and Matt Johnson.

In March 2006, Graves began a tour in support of Damien Echols and the West Memphis Three. Matt Johnson was replaced with Quincy Smash, who had played bass guitar for one of Graves' bands, The Mopes, before the Misfits. To coincide with the 2006 Halloween/Almost Home 2 tour, Graves' second solo effort titled Return to Earth was released on Halloween day of 2006.

Graves has written an album entitled Illusions with Echols. It consists of 15 songs and was released October 31, 2007. The lyrics are written by Echols and Graves, and feature J~Sin Trioxin and Quincy Smash. A year later, in October 2008, Graves released Illusions Live/Viretta Park, a combination live album and demo EP. It was recorded on April 24, 2008, at Club Bourbon in New Port Richey, Florida, and July 8 and 9, 2008 at Bucharest, Romania.

==== Marky Ramone's Blitzkrieg ====
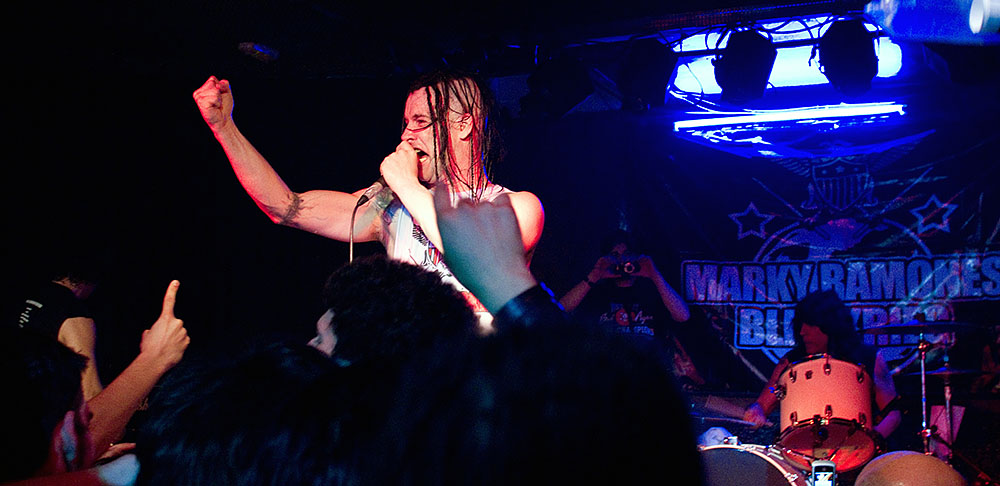
Graves performing with Marky Ramone's Blitzkrieg in 2010

Graves began touring as the singer for Marky Ramone's Blitzkrieg, which features the namesake drummer and at one stage members of the band Antiproduct, although the band now features a rotating lineup. The band covers vintage Ramones songs live, and in 2010 recorded a cover of a Graves song called "When We Were Angels", originally featured on Illusions. In March 2011, Blitzkrieg also released another song written by Graves entitled "If and When".

==== 2012–present ====
In March 2012, Graves met Mark Allen Stuart, CEO of Hydraulic Entertainment. After several meetings discussing potential projects, Stuart and Graves decided to create their first album Vagabond. On September 28, 2012, Graves began a pledge through Kickstarter to release the album, which eventually was released on February 6, 2013. With Vagabond, Graves showed a completely different side of his songwriting, as the album genre ranges between folk, rock and country. The release marked the beginning of the highly productive and successful partnership between Graves and Hydraulic Entertainment. On August 27, 2013, the album Vagabond Acoustic was released, containing eight acoustic songs from Vagabond with a short description of each song.

Later in 2012, a second Kickstarter release was announced, Lost Skeleton Returns, which Graves referred to as a return to horror punk, and stated would feature ten re-recorded classics as well as four new songs. Lost Skeleton Returns was released on June 20, 2013. Motionless in White vocalist Chris Motionless provided guest vocals on the track "Forbidden Planet". The album was supported by nationwide touring with Graves performing as his infamous "Skele-Crow" character for the first time in nearly a decade. Following the release of Lost Skeleton Returns, an instrumental version of the album was issued and made available to fans online. An extremely limited number of copies of this edition were made. An acoustic album called Supernatural was released on February 7, 2014, and features acoustically performed songs of Lost Skeleton Returns.

On June 3, 2014, Graves released a new album titled Wanderer, a musical follow-up to Vagabond, which was once again funded through his Kickstarter project. An acoustic version of the record called Wanderer Acoustic was released on February 3, 2015, following the tradition of Vagabond Acoustic and Supernatural. Later in 2015, a CD titled The Hydraulic Entertainment Demo's Volume 1 with demo recordings of songs from Vagabond, Lost Skeleton Returns, Vagabond Acoustic and Supernatural was released.

In January 2016, the full-band album When Worlds Collide was released as the follow-up to Lost Skeleton Returns. The album contained 11 new songs and combined punk, horror punk and monster rock in Graves' typical manner. The record also included the sequel to the fan-favorite song "Saturday Night", which is called "Dying on Sunday Morning". In summer 2016, Graves recorded and released the album Bedlam, which is the acoustic counterpart to When Worlds Collide. A new take on "Dying on Sunday Morning" was added with the song "Feels Like I'm Dying". In the spirit of Lost Skeleton Returns Instrumental, Graves released When Worlds Collide Instrumental later that year. Graves and Hydraulic Entertainment also made the demos of When Worlds Collide available for the fans and released a limited CD with early versions of the songs. Graves began extensive touring in support of the albums playing in 20+ countries.

So far, Graves has produced and worked on 14 music projects/albums with Hydraulic Entertainment.

Michale Graves' current solo project is managed by Arturo Santaella (Lynch-Moore Studios). Graves and Santaella started an acoustic tour around the U.S. in September 2021 performing in venues and private parties. Per Santaella, Graves is scheduled to tour in South America in 2022. In 2025, Graves revealed he was working on new music. He toured throughout South America in the Fall of that year.

In 2026, it was announced Graves had signed with the Christian label Epochal Artists Records, he also embarked on the "God Bless America" tour throughout the Spring of that year. During the Fall he will embark on a aucostic tour throughout the US.

==== Other projects / guest vocals ====
Along with the month-long writing and recording session of Punk Rock Is Dead, Graves also laid down vocal tracks for the band Summer's End's debut self-titled release. He wrote the lyrics and recorded the vocals for the song "Headwound". Graves wrote and sang on the album The All-Star Sessions, made by all the bands which reside on the Roadrunner record label, before his departure into the Marines. His vocals can be found on the track he penned with Trivium's guitarist/singer Matt Heafy, "I Don't Wanna Be (a Superhero)".

Graves appeared as a guest vocalist on the song "Zombie Romance" in Snow White's Poison Bite's album Snow White's Poison Bite: Featuring Dr. Gruesome and the Gruesome Gory Horror Show, released in April 2013.

In October 2014, Graves and the Russian punk band Night of Samhain released a double-album on the Hydraulic Entertainment label. The first disc contains the entire album with English vocals, translated and sung by Graves. The second disc contains the original album by Night of Samhain, sung in Russian by the band's lead singer Michael Shaforostov. The concept for the two-CD album was created by Hydraulic Entertainment CEO Mark Allen Stuart and the project was nominated for an Independent Music Award – Album of the Year. In 2015, the second double-album Revenge of the Zombies was released, featuring acoustic renditions of songs from Zombies Unite. The first eight tracks are English versions performed by Graves, while the second eight are Russian versions performed by Night of Samhain.

On August 28, 2015, Graves started another Kickstarter campaign for Nightmares, featuring a collection of classic horror stories read by himself. The project was successfully funded and released in late 2015.

On August 27, 2016, Swedish punk band Zombiesuckers released their album From Ashes, including the single "Endless Sleep" featuring lead vocals by Graves.

On April 23, 2021, American horror punk band The Sadists released the album Moonlight Murders, which included the song "Bride of the Monster" taken from studio sessions recorded a few years prior with Graves on guest vocals.

== Musical style and influences ==
Many of Graves musical influences come from 1960s and 70s music which he grew up listening to such as Bruce Springstein, Simon & Garfunkel, The Rolling Stones and The Beach Boys. He was introduced to punk music via bands such as the Ramones, Bad Brains and Sex Pistols. He has also noted that he was inspired by solo artist such as John Denver, Ozzy Osbourne and David Bowie.

Graves Christian background has had an impact on his song writing once stating "the music that I've written and the lyrics that I've written have always come from that place. Not all the songs, but many, many, lots of those songs come from that Christian perspective."

Many of Graves early solo albums kept the horror-punk style however with later releases he began to incorporate songs played in acoustic.

== Political views ==
Graves became a contributor to the Conservative Punk website in the early 2000s. In 2004, he was interviewed on his conservative positions on a piece for The Daily Show with Jon Stewart. He identified as a libertarian in 2013. In 2020, Graves endorsed the Proud Boys in an Instagram post. The post was later deleted.

In 2021, Graves posted on his website a page titled "See You In Washington DC on January 5th and 6th" and an image of a poster advertising "InfoWars Alex Jones Rally to Save America" (Jan. 5), with the statement "I will be in Washington DC on January 5th and 6th taking part in several different missions alongside hundreds of thousands of fellow American patriots rally in the capital." Similar poster art was posted on his Instagram page, including one apparently by "Latinos for Trump" with a photo of Graves and the words "FREEDOM RALLY SPECIAL APPEARANCE" with the date January 6. In mid-December 2020, Graves posted on his Parler account "Seems like the choice is war"—no context was given. On January 5, 2021, he posted "The next two days changes everything. We are ready. We are awake. We are fuckin' pissed!" On January 6, he posted a picture apparently of members of Congress lying on the floor between rows of seats, apparently taken that day, along with these words: "When the people fear the government, there is tyranny... When the government fears the people... There is liberty." He later posted "R. I. P. America 1776-2021."

Graves reportedly agreed to play a private show for the Proud Boys in Washington, D.C., on the afternoon of January 6, 2021, but failed to appear for the show. In March, he was listed as a possible witness for the defense by lawyers representing Ethan "Rufio" Nordean who was charged with conspiracy in connection with the January 6 United States Capitol attack.

In February 2025, an upcoming Graves show in Pittsburgh was cancelled by the venue after an online backlash made the venue aware that he was an "open member of the Proud Boys." Graves attempted to move the show but two more venues cancelled for the same reason. Soon after, a show in Colorado Springs was cancelled, an offer to headline a Halloween festival in Las Vegas was rescinded and a show in Mansfield, Texas was cancelled.

In February 2026, Graves had all his upcoming shows in Wales cancelled due to his links with US far-right movement The Proud Boys. He was meant to play The Bunkhouse in Swansea, Fuel in Cardiff and Jacs in Aberdare, Rhondda Cynon Taf, at the end of this month. According to the tour's promoters, Deadwave Records, the gigs are among a number of his to have been shelved around the UK "to avoid trouble" after "a group of people protested against them". As of March 2026 another show from his "God Bless America" tour was canceled. The show was a benefit for local veterans, scheduled for April 20, 2026. Due to local backlash regarding his role and support of the Proud Boys, the show was canceled.

== Personal life ==
Graves has three children. He is a Christian.

== Discography ==
=== The Misfits ===
Studio albums

- American Psycho (1997)
- Famous Monsters (1999)

Live albums

- Evillive II (1998)

Compilation albums

- Cuts from the Crypt (2001)

Singles

- "Dig Up Her Bones" (1997)
- "Scream!" (1999)
- "Monster Mash" (1999)

=== Graves ===
- Web of Dharma (2002)

=== Gotham Road ===
- Seasons of the Witch (2003)
- Gotham Rd. Live in Portland (2004)

=== Solo ===
Studio albums

- Punk Rock Is Dead (2005)
- Return to Earth (2006)
- Illusions (with Damien Echols) (2007)

Studio albums with Hydraulic Entertainment LLC AV

- Vagabond (2013)
- The Lost Skeleton Returns (2013)
- Vagabond Acoustic (2013)
- Supernatural (2014)
- Wanderer (2014)
- Wanderer Acoustic (2015)
- Nightmares (2015)
- When Worlds Collide (2016)
- Bedlam (2016)
- Backroads (2017)
- The World Turned Upside Down (2017)
- Keys (2018)

Compilation albums

- Demos and Live Cuts Vol. I (2007)
- Demos and Live Cuts Vol. II (2007)
- Demos and Live Cuts Vol. III (2008)
- Demos and Live Cuts Vol. IV: The 1998 Sessions (2008)
- The Scarecrow Selections (Box Set) (2009)

Compilation albums with Hydraulic Entertainment LLC AV

- Supernatural Instrumental (2014)
- Drifter (2015)
- The Hydraulic Entertainment Demo's Volume 1 (2015)
- When Worlds Collide Instrumental (2016)
- The Legacy Collection (Box Set) (2016)
- When Worlds Collide Demo Disc (2016)
- The World Turned Upside Down (Demos) (2017)

Live albums

- Illusions Live (2008)
- Halifax: Live at the Musicroom (2009)

Extended plays

- Viretta Park (2008)
- Arkansas Sessions (2008)
- Burn Baby Burn (2011)
- Trilogy (2017)

Singles

- "No Rain" (Blind Melon cover) (2012)

=== Collaborations ===
Studio albums

- Zombies Unite (with Night of Samhain) (2014)
- Revenge of the Zombies (with Night of Samhain) (2015)

Singles

- "I Don't Wanna Be (A Superhero)" (with Roadrunner United) (2005)
- "When We Are Angels" (with Marky Ramone's Blitzkrieg) (2010)
- "If And When" (with Marky Ramone's Blitzkrieg) (2011)
- "Touch Me" (with Sardonica) (2012)
- "Endless Sleep" (with Zombie Suckers) (2016)
- "East Versus West" (with No Buffer) (2016)
- "Bride of the Monster" (with The Sadists) (2021)

== Filmography ==
- Animal Room (1995) credited as The Misfits
- Big Money Hustlas (2000), credited as The Misfits
- Bruiser (2000), credited as the Misfits
- Campfire Stories (2001), credited as The Misfits
- Perkins' 14 (2009), credited as Michale Graves
- The Pier (2011), credited as Michale Graves
- Zombie (2012), credited as Michale Graves
- Half Human (2014), credited as Michale Graves
- Wanderer (2014), credited as Michale Graves
- Zombies (2014), credited as Michale Graves
- Ripper (2015), credited as Michale Graves
