= Demos and Live Cuts Vol. I =

Compilation album by Michale Graves
- Released: February 26, 2007
- Recorded: 2000–2007
- Genre: Horror punk, punk rock
- Length: 37:30

Michale Graves chronology
Return to Earth (2006)	Demos and Live Cuts Vol. I (2007)	Demos and Live Cuts Vol. II (2007)

Demos and Live Cuts Vol. I is the first compilation album by Michale Graves. The album includes a collection of demos, pre-production drafts, and live outtakes from a 2006 performance at CBGB’s in New York City.

== Track listing ==
No.	Title	Length
1.	"Almost Home (Octopod Studio Demo - Melancholy Mix)"	2:23
2.	"Creepy Crawly (Octopod Studio Demo - Mopes Mix)"	2:32
3.	"Dead Beat (Octopod Studio Demo - Psycho Mix)"	1:49
4.	"Lucifer, I Am (Demo)"	2:16
5.	"Frostbite (Demo)"	3:22
6.	"I Like to Watch Them"	2:48
7.	"Shoelace (Original Demo)"	3:23
8.	"Dig Up Her Bones / Crying On Saturday Night (Live Acoustic CBGB '06)"	8:19
9.	"Almost Home (Live Acoustic CBGB '06)"	2:47
10.	"Blackbird (Original Demo)"	1:58
11.	"Thousand Cracks Of Daylight"	3:58
12.	"The Blackness and the Forest"	1:55
Total length:		37:30
