= KFRR =

Radio station in Woodlake–Fresno, California

Coordinates: 36.637°N 118.944°W

- Woodlake, California; United States
- Broadcast area: Fresno metropolitan area
- Frequency: 104.1 MHz
- Branding: New Rock 104.1

Programming
- Format: Alternative Rock
- Affiliations: Compass Media Networks

Ownership
- Owner: John Ostlund; (One Putt Broadcasting)
- Sister stations: KJFX, KJWL, KWDO

History
- First air date: September 1992
- Former call signs: KFCL (1992–1994)
- Call sign meaning: Fresno Radio

Technical information
- Licensing authority: FCC
- Facility ID: 29051
- Class: B
- ERP: 17,000 watts
- HAAT: 260 meters (850 ft)
- Translator: 100.3 K262DK (Fresno)

Links
- Public license information: Public file; LMS
- Webcast: Listen live
- Website: newrock1041.fm

KFRR (104.1 FM) is a commercial radio station licensed to Woodlake, California, United States, and serving the Fresno metropolitan area. It airs an alternative rock format and is owned by John Ostlund. The studios and offices are at One Putt Broadcasting in Downtown Fresno, across from the historic Warnors Theater.

KFRR's transmitter is sited in Hartland, California, at Eshom Point, about 20 miles (32 km) east of Fresno. The station is also heard on FM translator K262DK at 100.3 MHz in Fresno.

== History ==
=== Classical and AC ===
KFRR signed on the air in September 1992. The original call sign was KFCL, as Fresno's first commercial classical music station. But it was difficult for the station to find advertisers for the classical music format. Two years later, it flipped to adult contemporary music with a change of call letters to KFRR. It used the slogan, "K104-In-A-Row" (where the station plays four songs in a row without commercial interruptions).

To generate publicity, KFRR gave away plastic "credit card style" cards which were branded with a unique number. The station would call out for a numbered card, and if those listeners phoned in within 10 minutes, they'd receive a cash prize. If nobody called in, the cash prize amount would increase until someone won it. This was known as the "Cash Call Jackpot". The jackpot always started at $104.01 when it was reset, tying in with the station's spot on the FM dial. KFRR's main competitor at this time was KTHT Mix 102.7 (now country station KHGE).

=== Modern Rock ===
In 1995, KFRR's format was changed to modern rock, branded as "New Rock 104". The station slogan was "This Is Not For You". KFRR was the first alternative station in Fresno after KKDJ "105.9 The Edge" ended its modern rock sound. KFRR played much of the New Wave 1980s hits (labeled as "Retro-Flashbacks"), as well as current and recent modern rock titles. Key artists included Nirvana, Smashing Pumpkins, Jewel and Counting Crows.

KFRR had no competition in the modern rock format until KVSR "Star 101" debuted with modern adult contemporary. While it played a number of the same artists as KFRR, it was pop-leaning, whereas KFRR took a more rock approach. Shortly afterwards, the competition increased again when 96.7 KALZ debuted as "Alice 102.7" to go up against KVSR as a modern adult contemporary station.

=== Morning shows ===
In 1995, KFRR began airing a nationally syndicated morning program to its line up. The Bob & Tom Show, based in Indianapolis, was heard in mornings on KFRR. The show was not successful in the ratings. The Bob & Tom Show was mostly heard on classic rock station, aimed at middle aged listeners.

In October 1995, Rob Frazier (aka Robnokshus) took over the morning show with Andy as his co-host. Meanwhile, The Bob & Tom Show was moved to classic rock sister station 95.7 KJFX, where it continues to be heard.

The Robnokshus Show lasted less than a year. On April 29, 1996, the station announced it was bringing The Howard Stern Show to Fresno mornings. Stern held a press conference which aired on the station. It featured a heated battle between Stern and TV news reporter Michael Golden. Stern became angry because he believed Golden was insulting co-host Robin Quivers. Stern got so furious, he ended that press conference early.

=== Kevin & Bean and Adam Carolla ===
In August 1999, KFRR made some noticeable changes to the playlist, adopting a harder-edged rock style. It began playing rock "hits" over lesser known songs. It deleted more pop-leaning artists that were heard on rival stations KVSR and KTHT, such as the Goo Goo Dolls, Verve Pipe and The Dave Matthews Band. Instead, KFRR opted to play more songs that were heard on active rock stations.

On April 20, 2001, KFRR dropped The Howard Stern Show. It began carrying The Kevin and Bean Show from Los Angeles. The station also dropped its moniker "New Rock 104", replacing its slogan to "The Valley's Alternative".

On January 3, 2005, Wilks Broadcasting announced it was purchasing KFRR, KJFX, and KTSX from Mondosphere Broadcasting.

On January 3, 2006, Kevin & Bean was replaced with The Adam Carolla Show. That program was created when Howard Stern ended his terrestrial radio show and went to Sirius Satellite Radio. Carolla's show was offered in syndication to mostly West Coast rock and hot talk stations.

Signaling yet another shift in format, on Monday, September 10, 2007, KFRR changed its slogan to "104.1, It Just Rocks." The station began featuring more 1980s and 90s mainstream rock.

On February 19, 2009, Westwood One, the company that syndicated Adam Carolla, announced that his show would be cancelled as of February 20, 2009. KFRR continued to broadcast "Best of" recorded editions of the Adam Carolla Show. An online and telephone poll was conducted by KFRR to determine what would be played on the station on weekday mornings replacing Carolla. On April 20, 2009, KFRR announced it would again be broadcasting the Kevin and Bean Show from KROQ-FM in Los Angeles, starting with the Kevin & Bean Rewind. Live broadcasts of Kevin & Bean started on May 4, 2009.

=== Harder-edged rock ===
On October 13, 2010, Clear Channel Communications-owned KRZR 103.7 dropped its active rock format. It flipped to the company's new 90s-focused "Gen-X Rhythmic" format, switching its call letters to KFBT. With no active rock competition, KFRR began to focus on a broader rock sound. It again dropped the syndicated Kevin & Bean Morning Show. It filled the morning hours with more music. As KFRR remained alternative rock with Nielsen BDS, Mediabase moved it to the active rock panel. KFRR has since reverted to Mediabase's alternative rock panel as of March 2012.

On December 10, 2010, KFFR debuted The Morning After, a local morning show featuring Skippy, who was a fixture on KRZR afternoons before the format change. That show was later replaced with The Rev hosting wake-ups on the station.

On Tuesday, November 25, 2014, KFRR and sister stations KJFX and KJZN were purchased by One Putt from Wilks Broadcasting for $6.6 million. On January 30, 2015, the purchase was consummated.
