= Get Acquainted Vol. 1 =

Compilation album by various artists
- Released: 2008
- Recorded: 1996–2008
- Genre: Heavy metal, horror punk
- Length: 79:57
- Label: TheNextArt

Get Acquainted is a CD compilation of rare material of horror punk, alternative rock, garage rock, stoner rock and heavy metal bands. It was released in 2008 with the German book Metall macht Musik, illustrated by Tim Eckhorst and published by TheNextArt).

Among others, the CD features previously unreleased songs by ex-Misfits-singer Michale Graves and his band Gotham Road. Those songs were made available on a factory pressed CD for the first time.

The album also contains three songs by American horror punk group Blitzkid.

== Track listing ==
1. Gotham Road – "On My Way"
2. Brazen Angel – "What's Out There"
3. April Fool – "Less You Talk"
4. Die Bilderwelten – "Hausarrest"
5. Elektrohahn und die Legebatterie – "The People of Santa Fée"
6. Elektrohahn und die Legebatterie – "H.A.N.F."
7. Grid Iron – "Second Song"
8. Brazen Angel – "For the World"
9. Strange Heart – "Alone in the Dark"
10. Butterfinger – "Fall (Rock Remix)"
11. Apiskuko – "I Feel Alive"
12. Apiskuko – "Walk Away"
13. Blind Fury – "This Is Life"
14. Janus – "Sour Wine"
15. Gotham Road – "Say Something"
16. Michale Graves – "Shoestring (Acoustic Demo)"
17. Michale Graves – "Casket (Acoustic Demo)"
18. Blitzkid – "I'm a Zombie"
19. Blitzkid – "Hate You Better"
20. Blitzkid – "Ad Nauseum [sic] Memorie (live)"
21. Peter Carr – "Insanity"
22. Silent Fear – "Broken Man"
23. Willy G. and his Mother's Sons – "I Bet Satan Made Love to Your Mother"

== Metal macht Musik ==
- ECKHORST, Tim, Metall macht Musik, TheNextArt-Verlag, 2008. ISBN 978-3-939400-18-9
