= The Mark Levin Show =

American conservative talk radio program

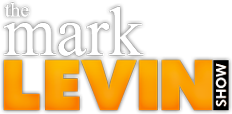
- Genre: Conservative talk
- Running time: 3 hours (6–9 p.m. ET and PT)
- Country of origin: United States
- Language: English
- Home station: WABC, New York City (2002–present); WMAL, Washington, D.C. (2006–present)
- Syndicates: Westwood One
- TV adaptations: Life, Liberty & Levin
- Hosted by: Mark Levin
- Recording studio: Loudoun County, Virginia
- Original release: May 5, 2002 (local); January 30, 2006 (national) – present
- Opening theme: "Somewhere I Belong" by Linkin Park (live show) "The Star-Spangled Banner"
- Website: www.marklevinshow.com

The Mark Levin Show is an American conservative talk radio show hosted by Mark Levin.

== History ==
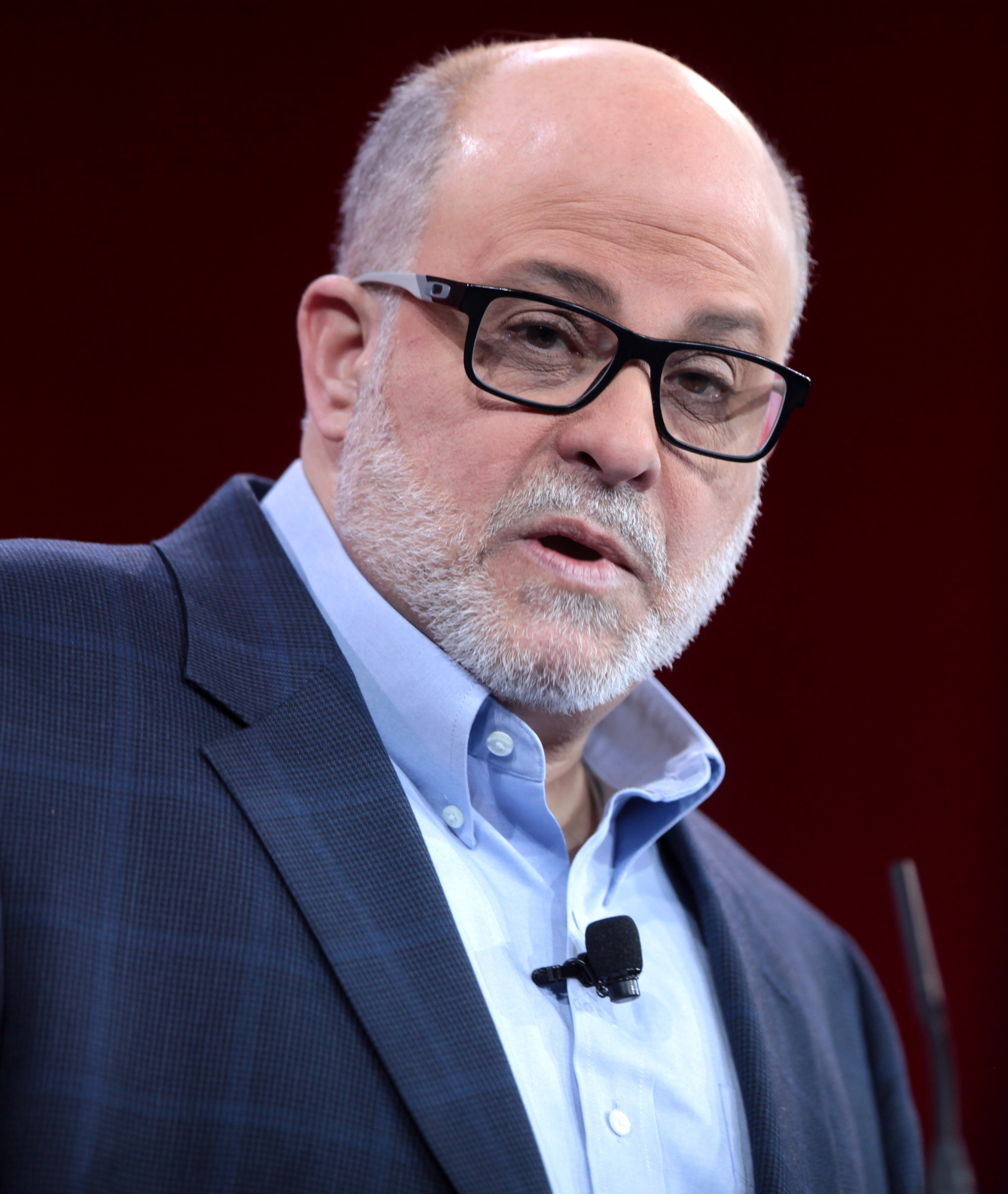
Mark Levin

Levin began his career as a radio host in 2002 in a Sunday afternoon timeslot on WABC. WABC assigned Levin to fill in starting on June 16, 2003, after the station dropped The Savage Nation for the 6–8 pm.time period weeknights. On September 2, 2003, his show moved to the 6–8 p.m. timeslot on WABC. Levin's WABC program expanded to 2 hours starting May 17, 2004.

On January 30, 2006, ABC Radio Networks began syndicating the show. Initially, ABC expanded the program to three other stations, including WMAL in Levin's local Washington metropolitan area. On February 2, 2009, the program expanded to 3 hours (6–9 p.m. ET). ABC's radio assets later changed hands to Citadel Broadcasting in 2007, then to Cumulus Media in 2011; in 2013, Cumulus combined all of its radio assets under the banner of Westwood One. Levin signed a five-year contract extension with Westwood One in January 2015. He signed further extensions in 2016 and 2024, with Levin indicating he intended to stay at Westwood One for the rest of his life.

The Mark Levin Show can be heard on over 150 stations and the SIRIUS XM Patriot channel. Levin's show has been rated number one in its time slot in New York, Chicago, Detroit, Dallas–Fort Worth and Washington, D.C.

On June 25, 2018, Levin was elected into the Radio Hall of Fame.

== Format ==
His radio show, a mix of political and social commentary from a conservative point of view, covers legal issues, including decisions of the Supreme Court of the United States. Levin follows the conventional talk radio model of taking listener calls throughout the show; he is often hostile to callers opposing his views, frequently cutting them off with words like "get off the phone, you idiot!".

The show's program segments often feature Levin recounting contemporary news items and controversies. The pace of these segments starts as slow and brooding and eventually escalate into Levin angrily shouting questions at "Mr. Producer" (Rich Sementa, Executive Producer of the program), who occasionally has a speaking role on the show.

Levin uses his own on-air slurs, some of which he invented and some of which he popularized. He uses disparaging nicknames for mainstream media outlets, politicians, journalists, etc. such as "The New York Slimes" for The New York Times, "The Washington Compost" for The Washington Post, "MSLSD" for MSNBC, "Dizzy Lizzy" for Liz Cheney, "Meritless Garland" for Merrick Garland, "Michael Bloomturd" for Michael Bloomberg, "The Daily Bestiality" for The Daily Beast, "Deface the Nation" for Face the Nation, "Schmucky Schumer" for Chuck Schumer, "Stretch Pelosi" for Nancy Pelosi, "National Pubic Radio" for National Public Radio, "Maggot Haberman" for Maggie Haberman, "Kamala Embarrass" for Kamala Harris, "Chatsworth Qatarlson" for Tucker Carlson, "The Transgendering Weiner" for Michael Savage, "The Department of Injustice" for the Department of Justice, "Mediocre-ite" for Mediaite, and "Morning Schmoe" for Morning Joe.
