= Reza Haghighatnejad =

Iranian journalist (1977–2022)

- Born: Reza Haghighatnejad; 26 June 1977
- Died: 17 October 2022 (aged 45); Berlin, Germany
- Occupations: Journalist; Political commentator
- Years active: 2000s–2022
- Known for: Research on corruption in the IRGC; Research on the structure of the Office of the Supreme Leader of Iran

Reza Haghighatnejad (Persian: رضا حقیقت‌نژاد; born 26 June 1977 – 17 October 2022) was an Iranian journalist who worked as an analyst and political commentator with Persian-language media inside and outside Iran.

Haghighatnejad started working as a journalist at the beginning of the 2000s and worked in Iran's domestic media until 2012. After that, he left Iran and started working with Persian-language media outside Iran. Haghighatnejad worked at Radio Farda from 2019 until his death and was one of the editors of this media. Late in his life, he was diagnosed with colon cancer and died at the age of 45 at the Charité hospital in Berlin, Germany.

== Body abduction ==
On Wednesday, October 26, 2022, and at the same time as the 40th day of Mahsa Amini's death, the body of Haghighatnejad which was sent to Iran for burial in his hometown, was kidnapped at Shiraz airport by IRGC agents. The security forces have pressured the family of Haghighatnejad to immediately move his body out of Shiraz and bury it in another cemetery by four o'clock on Wednesday evening. His body was kidnapped while permission to bury his body in Iran had been issued earlier.

After days of effort to retrieve the body from the security agents finally, on Sunday, October 30, they were informed that the IRGC buried the body in an unnamed grave far from his hometown.
