= Nicolas Tikhobrazoff =

French painter and radio host (1946–2022)

- Born: 6 June 1946; Paris, France
- Died: 3 October 2022 (aged 76)
- Occupations: Painter; Radio host

Nicolas Tikhobrazoff (6 June 1946 – 3 October 2022) was a French painter and radio host.

== Biography ==
Born on 6 June 1946 in Paris, Tikhobrazoff was a member of the Conseil national français des arts plastiques. He then became a member of the Salon d'Automne in 1973, the Société Nationale des Beaux-Arts in 2001, and later the Fondation Taylor.

Tikhobrazoff's style centered around lines, anamorphic effects, and medieval calligraphy. In 2000, he took over Jean-Claude Montagné's Libre journal des collectionneurs on Radio Courtoisie. He was founding president of Artcorusse, a Franco-Russian arts club established in 2007.
