= Conservative Punk =

Website promoting conservative views in punk subculture

- Website type: Political
- Creator: Nick Rizzuto

Conservative Punk was a website that promoted conservative views in the punk subculture. It was created by Nick Rizzuto in 2004.

== History ==
Nick Rizzuto, a publicist for KROCK, a New York City radio station, created the website partially in response to the left-liberal group Punkvoter, which was created by NOFX lead singer Fat Mike (aka Mike Burkett). The Conservative Punk website received significant press coverage during the 2004 presidential election.

An early contributor to the site was Dave Smally of the band Down by Law. The site also received contributions from talk radio personality Andrew Wilkow and former Misfits singer and Gotham Road frontman Michale Graves. Dorian Lynskey of The Guardian wrote about Rizzuto: "To his critics he's a crank bringing punk's good name into disrepute – but to his supporters he's the fearless voice of a formerly silent minority."

In early 2010, Nick Rizzuto, without notice, stopped paying the hosting fees for Conservativepunk.com, causing the website and discussion forum to become inaccessible. Longtime members and regular posters created a replacement site, ConPunk.com, in order to maintain the community. However, that site went offline in May 2013, in favor of a Facebook group; as of 2014, the Facebook group had also closed.
