= KWDO =

Coordinates: 36.608°N 119.998°W

- San Joaquin, California; United States
- Broadcast area: Fresno, California
- Frequency: 105.5 MHz
- Branding: The Legend 105.5

Programming
- Format: Classic country

Ownership
- Owner: John & Katie Ostlund; (One Putt Broadcasting)
- Sister stations: KFRR, KJFX, KJWL

History
- First air date: 1999 (as KWOL)
- Former call signs: KVPC (1989–1999, CP); KWOL (1999–2004); KTSX (2004–2005); KUUS (2005–2006); KJZN (2006–2017); KJWL (2017–2022)

Technical information
- Licensing authority: FCC
- Facility ID: 64144
- Class: B1
- ERP: 25,000 watts
- HAAT: 100 meters (328 ft)

Links
- Public license information: Public file; LMS
- Website: thelegendfresno.com

KWDO (105.5 FM) is a commercial radio station licensed to San Joaquin, California, broadcasting to the Fresno, radio market. It airs a classic country radio format. KWDO is owned by John & Katie Ostlund with the license held by One Putt Broadcasting. The studios and offices are located at 1415 Fulton Street in downtown Fresno.

The transmitter is off Manning Avenue, west of downtown Fresno, near Riverdale. KWDO has an effective radiated power (ERP) of 25,000 watts, broadcasting from a tower that is 100 meters (328 feet) in height above average terrain.

== History ==
The station signed on in 1999 as KWOL, although while it was still unbuilt, the Federal Communications Commission construction permit used the call sign KVPC.

On January 14, 2005, the station began stunting; after the stunt, the station officially signed on with a smooth jazz format as KJZN. This was the second station in Fresno to use the smooth jazz format, which was previously heard on KEZL (now KALZ).

On April 29, 2009, the station began stunting with Christmas music interspersed with Santa Claus-voiced liners which invited listeners to tune in at noon on May 1, if they "can handle the truth." At the promised time, the station flipped to a conservative talk format, branded as "105.5 The Truth."

On January 28, 2013, KJZN flipped to sports radio, branded as "105.5 The Game," with programming from the CBS Sports Radio Network.

On November 25, 2014, KJZN and sister stations KFRR and KJFX were purchased by One Putt Broadcasting from Wilks Broadcasting. The purchase was consummated on January 30, 2015.

On March 5, 2015 at 6 a.m., KJZN flipped to classic hip-hop. Initially set to be branded as "Bling 105.5”, One Putt instead held an online poll to determine the new name; in mid-March, the branding was revealed as "Rewind 105.5".

On January 1, 2017, KJZN dropped the classic hip-hop format, flipped to Soft Adult Contemporary, and adopted the "K-Jewel" branding and KJWL call sign previously heard on 99.3 FM (now KJWL once again). On January 5, 2017, KJZN officially changed its call sign to KJWL.

On May 23, 2022, it was announced that KJWL would move back to 99.3 FM on May 30, replacing the "Now FM" format on that frequency when it launched in 2017. A new permanent format was to debut at 105.5 FM after a month of simulcasting.

On July 4, 2022, at 6 am, KJWL changed its format from classic hits to classic country, branded as "The Legend 105.5". On July 9, 2022, the station took on the KWDO call sign.

== Previous logos ==
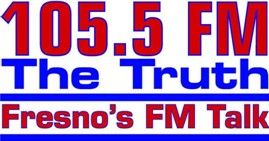
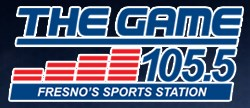
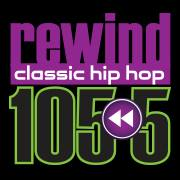
