= WETD =

Alfred, New York; United States
- Frequency: 90.7 MHz
- Branding: 90.7 FM the Leap

Programming
- Format: Defunct (was college radio)

Ownership
- Owner: Alfred State College; (State University of New York)

History
- First air date: 1973; 53 years ago
- Last air date: June 2, 2022; 3 years ago
- Call sign meaning: Engineering Technology Department

Technical information
- Licensing authority: FCC
- Facility ID: 63129
- Class: A
- ERP: 3,200 watts
- HAAT: 91.0 meters (298.6 ft)
- Transmitter coordinates: 42°15′37.00″N 77°47′51.00″W

Links
- Public license information: Public file; LMS

WETD (90.7 FM) was a college radio station broadcasting a variety format. Licensed in Alfred, New York, United States, the station was owned throughout its existence by Alfred State College and operated by the college's student body.

== History ==
In the early 1960s, Alfred State College students tinkered with radio paraphernalia, providing entertainment to Happy Valley. A few members of the Engineering Technology faculty and staff took an interest, and soon WETD ("Engineering Technology Department") was an official radio station, broadcasting at 10 watts from the Engineering Building. There were strict programming rules and hours of operation; it was a character-building time for WETD, but mostly engineering-based.

By the late 1960s, music and radio were a powerful means of increasing social awareness, which drew more than just engineers to the studio. In the 1970s, there was campus-wide involvement by students from all curricula, resulting in Alfred State College Student Senate funding the operation as a student club/organization.

Also in the 1970s, the station moved its operations to the basement of the Orvis Activities Center, with much-needed equipment improvements installed in 1989 — new turntables, CD players, mixing board, reel to reel tape decks, cart machines, and powered by a 50-watt transmitter. But visibility was an issue, so plans were drafted in the 1990s to move the studios to the Orvis Activities Center with much more transmitter power and many more technology options. WETD received a construction permit from the Federal Communications Commission (FCC) to increase power from 350 watts to 3.5 kilowatts. On August 14, 2013, the WETD Main Studio was moved to a prime 4th floor location in the new $33 million Student Leadership Center (SLC) at Alfred State College. WETD DJs & alumni welcomed visitors on September 27, 2013, during ASC's Homecoming and Family Weekend events.

WETD was actively involved in the local communities through on-air radio interviews and event announcements, as well as off-air through DJ events and community service projects. In March 2008, WETD set a goal and succeeded in raising over $1,100 from fellow students for needed children’s supplies at Jones Memorial Hospital in Wellsville (town), New York; for this, the station was later awarded the 2007-08 Community Service Award by the Alfred State College Student Senate. In November 2008, WETD DJs assisted in raising over $1,500 for Literacy Volunteers of Allegany County's Breakfast with Santa program, and then volunteered to serve as Santa's Helper for these students and their families at the breakfast. Out of 80+ ASC clubs and organizations, WETD was awarded the Community Service Award (now called the Civic Engagement Award) five times.

WETD students were committed to providing the best variety of music and programming in accordance with FCC regulations, as well as meeting the communities' needs both on-air and off. WETD held educational membership with the New York State Broadcasting Association (NYSBA) and the College Broadcasters Inc. (CBI). In August 2013, WETD was approved as an Associate member of the Wellsville (NY) Chamber of Commerce for its years of volunteer service at the Main Street Festival and the Great Wellsville Area Balloon Rally Clambake.

WETD's license was cancelled June 2, 2022. It was one of several State University of New York-owned student radio stations whose licenses were allowed to lapse that day, without filing for renewal.
