= Punk Rock Is Dead =

Studio album by Michale Graves
- Released: December 20, 2005
- Recorded: 2005
- Genre: Horror punk, punk, heavy metal
- Length: 24:01
- Label: Horror High Records

Michale Graves chronology
Punk Rock Is Dead (2005)	Return to Earth (2006)

Professional ratings
Review scores
Source	Rating
Ox-Fanzine	2/10 stars

Punk Rock Is Dead is the debut solo album by former Misfits singer Michale Graves. Horror High had approached Michale to record this as a sort of farewell before he was to embark on a stint with the United States Marines.

== Track listings ==
No.	Title	Length
1.	"Beware"	1:58
2.	"Teenage Monster"	2:03
3.	"Earth vs. Spider"	2:23
4.	"Exit"	1:45
5.	"1119"	3:22
6.	"Storybook and Rhyme"	1:35
7.	"Godzilla"	2:16
8.	"Queen Taste"	2:03
9.	"Radio Deadly"	1:26
10.	"Punk Rock Is Dead"	2:25
11.	"Dawn of the Dead"	2:45
Total length:		24:01
