= WFFM =

Radio station in Ashburn, Georgia

- Ashburn, Georgia; United States
- Broadcast area: Ashburn/Tifton
- Frequency: 105.7 MHz

Programming
- Format: Silent

Ownership
- Owner: Journey Church of Tifton, Inc.
- Sister stations: WTIF, WTIF-FM

History
- First air date: December 1989

Technical information
- Licensing authority: FCC
- Facility ID: 72056
- Class: A
- ERP: 6,000 watts
- HAAT: 100 meters (330 ft)
- Transmitter coordinates: 31°41′17.00″N 83°38′38.00″W
- Translator: (100.9 MHz) W265CC (Albany)

Links
- Public license information: Public file; LMS

WFFM (105.7 FM) is a radio station licensed to Ashburn, Georgia, United States. The station is currently owned by Journey Church of Tifton, Inc.

== History ==
The station began broadcasting in 1989. On July 1, 2013, WFFM changed its format from contemporary Christian (branded as "Hook FM") to country, branded as "The Flame". By 2017, the station had adopted a classic rock format.

On July 6, 2022, WFFM ceased operations.
