= KUVA =

- Uvalde, Texas; United States
- Frequency: 102.3 MHz

Programming
- Format: Silent

Ownership
- Owner: Javier Navarro Galindo; (South Texas Radio, LLC)

History
- First air date: 1984 (as KLXQ)
- Former call signs: KLXQ (1984–1991); KKXS (1991–1992)
- Call sign meaning: UVAlde

Technical information
- Licensing authority: FCC
- Facility ID: 43438
- Class: A
- ERP: 4,000 watts
- HAAT: 66 meters (217 ft)
- Transmitter coordinates: 29°11′16″N 99°46′36″W

Links
- Public license information: Public file; LMS

KUVA (102.3 FM) is a silent radio station licensed to serve Uvalde, Texas, United States. The station is owned by Javier Navarro Galindo, through licensee South Texas Radio, LLC.

Until June 29, 2022, KUVA broadcast a Tejano music format.

The station was assigned the call sign KUVA by the Federal Communications Commission on November 2, 1992.

On June 29, 2022, KUVA ceased operations.
