= WAIH (New York) =

Student-run radio station at SUNY Potsdam

- Potsdam, New York; United States
- Broadcast area: SUNY Potsdam, a 10-mile radius around the Barrington Student Union
- Frequency: 90.3 MHz

Ownership
- Owner: State University of New York

History
- First air date: September 24, 1994
- Last air date: June 2, 2022
- Former call signs: WRPS, WARP

Technical information
- Class: A
- ERP: 100 watts
- HAAT: −5 meters (−16 ft)

WAIH was a student-run non-commercial radio station located in Potsdam, New York. Its 100-watt broadcast signal originated from the campus of the state university (SUNY Potsdam) on the frequency of 90.3 FM. The station began free-air broadcasts on September 24, 1994, replacing a cable FM station (WRPS). The format of the station was mixed music, leaning towards "alternative" or less "pop-oriented" acts. WAIH also had a tradition of hosting many talk shows centered on subjects like sexuality, politics, and the general mix of talk and music. For many years, the station was referred to locally as "The Way," a moniker which students working at WAIH eventually adopted as an on-air tagline. On March 1, 2007, WAIH began simulcasting its radio signal over the Internet on its website.

WAIH's license was cancelled June 2, 2022. It was one of several SUNY-owned student radio stations whose licenses were allowed to lapse that day, without filing for renewal.

== Trivia ==
- Until the end in 2022, 90.3 "The Way" met every Sunday at 17:00 (5:00PM) in the second floor of the Barrington Student Union in the Fireside Lounge for their staff meetings
- Every year until 2019, "The Way" hosted a shadow-cast of The Rocky Horror Picture Show, complete with a costume contest, and other means of obtaining prizes
