= KINL =

Radio station in Eagle Pass, Texas

Coordinates: 28.733°N 100.493°W

- Eagle Pass, Texas; United States
- Frequency: 92.7 MHz

Ownership
- Owner: Javier Navarro Galindo

History
- First air date: November 2, 1971

Technical information
- Licensing authority: FCC
- Facility ID: 18108
- Class: C3
- ERP: 20,000 watts
- HAAT: 56 meters (184 ft)

Links
- Public license information: Public file; LMS

KINL (92.7 FM) is a radio station based in Eagle Pass, Texas. The station broadcasts with an ERP of 20,000 watts.

== History ==
KINL signed on November 2, 1971 as the sister station to KEPS.

The station was sold by Rhattigan Broadcasting to MBM Radio Eagle Pass, a subsidiary of R Communications, in 2013.

On June 29, 2022, KINL ceased operations.

KINL Power 92.7 FM went live again on June 15, 2023, at 10:30 am.
