= WSWW-FM =

- Craigsville, West Virginia; United States
- Broadcast area: Summersville, West Virginia; Webster Springs, West Virginia; Richwood, West Virginia; Burnsville, West Virginia
- Frequency: 95.7 MHz
- Branding: Lake Country 95.7 3WS

Programming
- Format: Country

Ownership
- Owner: WVRC Media

History
- First air date: 2008
- Call sign meaning: nod to sister WSWW

Technical information
- Licensing authority: FCC
- Facility ID: 166030
- Class: B1
- ERP: 25,000 watts
- HAAT: 99 meters (325 feet)
- Transmitter coordinates: 38°24′56.3″N 80°31′48.3″W

Links
- Public license information: Public file; LMS
- Webcast: Listen Live
- Website: 3ws957.com

WSWW-FM (Lake County 95.7 3WS) is a country music formatted broadcast radio station licensed to Craigsville, West Virginia, serving the Summersville/Webster Springs/Richwood area. WSWW-FM is owned and operated by WVRC Media.

WSWW-FM previously simulcast the format of WJLS 560 AM Beckley.

On August 8, 2022, WSWW-FM dropped its simulcast with WJLS and changed its format to country, branded as "Lake Country 95.7 3WS".
