= KJWL =

Coordinates: 36.735°N 119.787°W

- Fresno, California; United States
- Broadcast area: Fresno metropolitan area
- Frequency: 99.3 MHz
- Branding: K-Jewel 99.3 FM

Programming
- Format: Classic hits
- Affiliations: Premiere Networks

Ownership
- Owner: John Edward Ostlund
- Sister stations: KFRR, KJFX, KWDO

History
- First air date: 1994; 32 years ago
- Former call signs: KAGZ (1993–1994, CP); KJWL (1994–2017); KJZN (2017); KWDO (2017–2022)
- Call sign meaning: K JeWeL

Technical information
- Licensing authority: FCC
- Facility ID: 31538
- Class: B1
- ERP: 14,500 watts
- HAAT: 105 meters (344 ft)

Links
- Public license information: Public file; LMS
- Webcast: Listen live
- Website: www.kjwl.com

KJWL (99.3 FM) is a commercial radio station located in Fresno, California. The station airs a classic hits format and is branded as "K-Jewel 99.3 FM". Its studios are located on the Fulton Mall strip in downtown Fresno, while its transmitter is located atop the Golden State County Plaza, also in downtown.

== History ==
The station signed on the air in 1994 as KJWL with an adult standards music format. The station later evolved towards soft adult contemporary, and then adult album alternative, all under the "K-Jewel" branding.

On January 2, 2017, after stunting on New Year's Day with a loop of "Right Now" by Van Halen (as "K-Jewel" moved to KJZN and shifted back to Soft AC), KJWL flipped to Top 40/CHR as "99.3 Now FM". On January 5, 2017, KJWL changed its call letters to KJZN. On January 18, 2017, KJZN changed its call letters to KWDO.

On May 23, 2022, it was announced that the KJWL call letters and its classic hits format would return to 99.3 FM on May 30.

== Previous logo ==
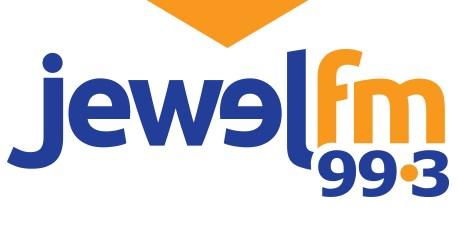
