= KBNU =

- Uvalde, Texas; United States
- Frequency: 93.9 MHz

Programming
- Format: Silent

Ownership
- Owner: Javier Navarro Galindo; (South Texas Radio LLC)

History
- First air date: 1996

Technical information
- Licensing authority: FCC
- Facility ID: 69552
- Class: C3
- ERP: 25,000 watts
- HAAT: 89 meters
- Transmitter coordinates: 29°16′34″N 99°41′44″W

Links
- Public license information: Public file; LMS

KBNU (93.9 FM) is a radio station licensed to Uvalde, Texas, United States. The station is currently owned by Javier Navarro Galindo, through licensee South Texas Radio, LLC.

== History ==
On April 4, 2017, KBNU changed their format from classic rock to hot adult contemporary, branded as "Hits 93.9".

On June 29, 2022, KBNU ceased operations.
