= WTIF-FM =

- Omega, Georgia; United States
- Broadcast area: Tifton, Georgia
- Frequency: 107.5 MHz

Programming
- Format: Silent

Ownership
- Owner: Journey Church of Tifton, Inc.
- Sister stations: WFFM, WTIF

History
- First air date: April 1993
- Former call signs: WXJF (July 12, 1990-August 30, 1991); WQBX (August 30, 1991-May 10, 1993)

Technical information
- Licensing authority: FCC
- Facility ID: 63841
- Class: A
- ERP: 6,000 watts
- HAAT: 100 meters
- Transmitter coordinates: 31°27′17.00″N 83°33′37.00″W

Links
- Public license information: Public file; LMS

WTIF-FM (107.5 FM) is a radio station licensed to Omega, Georgia, United States. The station is currently owned by Journey Church of Tifton, Inc.

== History ==
The station received its first call sign, WXJF, on July 12, 1990. On August 30, 1991, the station changed its call sign to WQBX, and on May 10, 1993 to the current WTIF-FM.

WTIF-FM had been airing a Country music format. On July 6, 2022, WTIF-FM ceased operations.
