= WJLS (AM) =

- Beckley, West Virginia; United States
- Broadcast area: Southeastern West Virginia
- Frequency: 560 kHz
- Branding: WJLS AM 560

Programming
- Language: English
- Format: Talk radio (day); Classic country music (night)
- Affiliations: Premiere Networks; Westwood One; West Virginia Miners

Ownership
- Owner: WVRC Media; (West Virginia Radio Corporation of Raleigh, LLC)
- Sister stations: WJLS-FM

History
- First air date: 1939
- Call sign meaning: "Joe L. Smith", father of station founder Joe L. Smith, Jr.

Technical information
- Licensing authority: FCC
- Facility ID: 52335
- Class: B
- Power: 4,500 watts day; 470 watts night
- Transmitter coordinates: 37°45′32.0″N 81°11′12.0″W
- Translator: 104.1 W281AJ (Beckley)

Links
- Public license information: Public file; LMS
- Webcast: Listen live
- Website: www.wjlsam.com

WJLS (560 kHz) is a commercial AM radio station licensed to Beckley, West Virginia, serving Southeastern West Virginia with talk radio programming during the daytime and country music in evenings and overnights. The sister station to WJLS-FM, it is owned and operated by WVRC Media, who bought both stations in the 2010s from First Media Radio, LLC. The station began broadcasting in 1939, the first radio station in Beckley, and was a CBS affiliate from 1943 to 1990.

== History ==
Logo when simulcasting on WSWW-FM

The station was founded in 1939 by Joe L. Smith Jr., the first radio station in Beckley. It used the tag "The Personality Station". When it became a CBS affiliate during World War II, Beckley was the smallest community with an affiliate station. WJLS was mentioned by name in episode 630 of the radio program Yours Truly Johnny Dollar, entitled "The Baldero Matter", which aired 03/15/1959. Yours Truly, Johnny Dollar is a radio drama that aired on CBS Radio from February 18, 1949 to September 30, 1962.

WJLS became a country music station in 1969, and a religious station in 1990, when it swapped formats with WJLS-FM. After being acquired by West Virginia Radio Company in the 2010s, it became a news/talk station in 2017. Simulcasting on 104.1 FM began in 2018; later that year the station was rebranded as WJLS News Network and simulcasting on 95.7 FM in Summersville was added. In 2016, WJLS moved from its original building in Beckley to occupy a floor in a building across the street.
