= Return to Earth (album) =

Studio album by Michale Graves
- Released: October 31, 2006
- Genre: Punk, horror punk, alternative rock
- Length: 24:26
- Label: Horror High
- Producer: Michale Graves

Michale Graves chronology
| Punk Rock Is Dead (2005) | Return to Earth (2006) | Demos and Live Cuts Vol. I (2007) |

Return to Earth is the second solo album by former Misfits vocalist Michale Graves, released on October 31, 2006. The album features the songs "Nobody Thinks About Me" and the long waited release of "Butchershop".

== Track listing ==
All songs written by Michale Graves.

| No. | Title | Length |
|---|---|---|
| 1. | "Monster" | 2:30 |
| 2. | "We Wait" | 1:38 |
| 3. | "One Moment Away" | 2:55 |
| 4. | "Fountains of Heroine" | 2:25 |
| 5. | "Creepy Crawly" | 2:24 |
| 6. | "Dead Beat" | 2:19 |
| 7. | "Nobody Thinks About Me" | 3:05 |
| 8. | "The House" | 1:50 |
| 9. | "Return to Earth" | 2:26 |
| 10. | "Butchershop" | 2:54 |
| Total length: | | 24:26 |
