= WJLS-FM =

- Beckley, West Virginia; United States
- Broadcast area: Southeastern West Virginia; Southwestern Virginia
- Frequency: 99.5 MHz
- Branding: 99-5 WJLS: The Big Dawg

Programming
- Language: English
- Format: Country music
- Affiliations: West Virginia MetroNews

Ownership
- Owner: WVRC Media; (West Virginia Radio Company of Raleigh, LLC)
- Sister stations: WJLS

History
- First air date: February 1947
- Call sign meaning: Taken from WJLS (AM)

Technical information
- Licensing authority: FCC
- Facility ID: 52336
- Class: B
- ERP: 34,000 watts
- HAAT: 320 meters (1,050 ft)
- Transmitter coordinates: 37°35′23.0″N 81°6′51.0″W

Links
- Public license information: Public file; LMS
- Webcast: Listen live
- Website: wjls.com

WJLS-FM (99.5 MHz) is a commercial radio station licensed to Beckley, West Virginia, United States, serving Southeastern West Virginia and Southwestern Virginia with a country music format. The station, which utilized the call letters WBKW from 1957 to 1990, was the second FM radio station to go on the air in West Virginia, and is the oldest to still exist. Since February 2013, it and its sister AM station have been owned by WVRC Media, which purchased them from First Media Radio, LLC.

== History ==
The AM station was founded in Beckley in 1939 by Joe L. Smith Jr. During World War II it became the smallest CBS affiliate in the country. The FM station launched as WBKW, a 4:00 pm–midnight music station, in late 1957. Both were purchased in the mid-2010s by the West Virginia Radio Corporation. In 2016, WJLS moved from its original building in Beckley to occupy a floor in a building across the street.
