= WCEB (Corning, New York) =

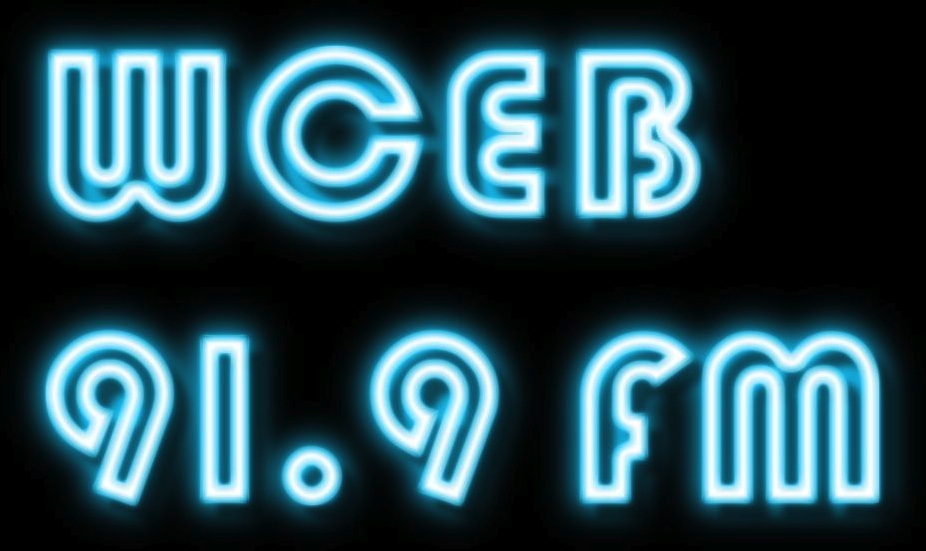
- Corning, New York; United States
- Frequency: 91.9 MHz
- Branding: 91.9 the Impact

Programming
- Format: Defunct (was variety)

Ownership
- Owner: Corning Community College

History
- First air date: April 1, 1974
- Last air date: June 2, 2022
- Call sign meaning: "Corning Educational Broadcasting"

Technical information
- Licensing authority: FCC
- Facility ID: 13942
- Class: D
- ERP: 15 watts
- HAAT: 123.0 meters (403.5 ft)
- Transmitter coordinates: 42°7′10″N 77°5′2″W

Links
- Public license information: Public file; LMS

WCEB (91.9 FM) was a radio station broadcasting a variety format. Licensed to Corning, New York, United States, the station was last owned by Corning Community College. Because of the location of its tower, the station was heard through much of the Corning, New York, area despite its low power.

== History ==
The station began broadcasting a mix of news and rock music from a trailer on the Corning Community College campus on April 1, 1974, with an 18-hour broadcast in a day. It carried news broadcasts from the UPI Radio network on the hour, and local news on the half-hour.

WCEB grew out of the school's Radio Club, which had broadcast a closed-circuit signal to the student union for a number of years while exploring the feasibility of a broadcast station. WCEB was programmed and staffed completely by students, and was first managed by sophomore student David Game, the station's first general manager.

Following Game's election as president of the Radio Club in 1973, funding was secured from the school, and Game supervised the project to obtain the necessary Federal Communications Commission license. He selected the station's call letters, which stood for "Corning Educational Broadcasting". The station's first broadcast was simulcast on local commercial station WCBA.

The radio station continued to be run by students, including Brian Burquwist, who became general manager in 1986. During Burquwist's tenure as general manager, William Bilancio served as program director.

WCEB's license was cancelled on June 2, 2022. It was one of several State University of New York-owned student radio stations whose licenses were allowed to lapse that day, without filing for renewal.
