= WTIF (AM) =

- Tifton, Georgia; United States
- Frequency: 1340 kHz

Programming
- Format: Silent

Ownership
- Owner: Journey Church of Tifton, Inc.
- Sister stations: WFFM, WTIF-FM

History
- First air date: 1957
- Call sign meaning: TIFton, Georgia

Technical information
- Licensing authority: FCC
- Facility ID: 67097
- Class: C
- Power: 1,000 watts
- Transmitter coordinates: 31°28′16.00″N 83°29′12.00″W
- Translator: 99.9 W260AT (Tifton)

Links
- Public license information: Public file; LMS

WTIF (1340 kHz) was an AM radio station licensed to Tifton, Georgia, United States. The station is currently owned by Journey Church of Tifton, Inc.

WTIF had been airing a classic country format. On July 6, 2022, WTIF ceased operations.

== FM translator ==
WTIF was rebroadcast on F.M. translator station W260AT on 99.9 MHz.

Broadcast translator for WTIF
Call sign	Frequency	City of license	FID	ERP (W)	HAAT	Class	Transmitter coordinates	FCC info
W260AT	99.9 FM	Tifton, Georgia	152360	250	108.5 m (356 ft)	D	31°30′34.7″N 83°31′12.6″W	LMS
