= Argyle Goolsby discography =

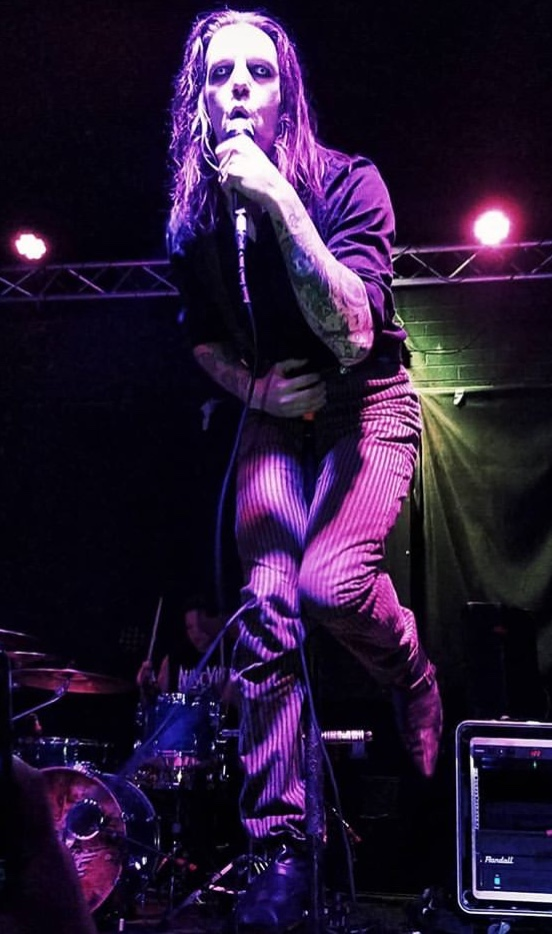
- Goolsby in 2018
- Studio albums: 2
- EPs: 2
- Compilation albums: 1
- Singles: 5
- Music videos: 4

The discography of Argyle Goolsby, an American horror punk musician, consists of two studio albums, one compilation album, two extended plays (EPs), and four music videos. After the disestablishment of Blitzkid in 2012, Goolsby started his solo career and toured under the band names Argyle Goolsby and the Roving Midnight and Argyle Goolsby and the Hollow Bodies. He released his debut album Darken Your Doorstep in 2017, which featured various members from bands Goolsby routinely toured with. His second full-length studio album Hollow Bodies was released on 21 August 2018.

== Albums ==
=== Studio albums ===
Title	Year	Format	Label
"Darken Your Doorstep"	2017	Vinyl (12"); CD; Digital	A Corpse with No Name
"Hollow Bodies"	2018	Vinyl (12"); CD; Digital	A Corpse with No Name

=== Compilations ===
Title	Year	Format	Label
"Saturnalia of the Accursed"	2015	Vinyl (12"); CD; Digital	A Corpse with No Name / No Balls Records

== Extended plays ==
Title	Year	Format	Label
"A Dream Not Quite Remembered..."	2012	Vinyl (12"); CD; Digital	No Balls Records
"Under the Witness Stars"	2013	Vinyl (7"); CD; Digital	A Corpse with No Name

== Splits ==
Title	Year	Format	Label
"The Wild and Woeful West Virginia"	2013	Vinyl (7")	A Corpse with No Name

== Singles ==
Title	Year	Format	Label
"Thickets"	2015	Digital	A Corpse with No Name
"Your Enemy's Best Friend"	2015	Digital	A Corpse with No Name
"Baskerville"	2015	Vinyl postcard	A Corpse with No Name
"Save Me Tonight" (Note: "Save Me Tonight" was originally released in 2016 on Horrorhound Presents: It's Only a Movie)	2018	Digital	A Corpse with No Name
"Mary and the Storm"	2018	Digital	A Corpse with No Name

== Music videos ==
Title	Year	Directed By	Premiered through
"In Votive Light"	April 2017	Horrorshow Pictures	Rue Morgue
"Ghost Light Waltz"	October 2017	Paul Acker	Sonic Seducer Musikmagazin
"Mister Babadook"	December 2017	Adam Judd	New Noise Magazine
"The Uninvited"	March 2018	Horrorshow Pictures	Orkus

== Other appearances ==
=== Non-album appearances ===
Song	Specifics
Kristen (Screams for Tina cover)	2011; Outtake from "A Dream Not Quite Remembered..." sessions
Words of Love (Buddy Holly cover)	2012; Test for upcoming recording levels

=== With Dr. Chud's X-Ward ===
Album	Year	Style	Format	Label
Diagnosis for Death	2004	Studio album	Vinyl (12"); CD; Digital	Bloodwork Records

=== With Mister Monster ===
Album	Year	Style	Format	Label
Deep Dark	2004	EP	CD	Hell's Hundred Records; Middle Pillar

=== With 1476 ===
Album	Year	Style	Format	Label
A Wolf's Age	2009	Studio album	CD; Digital	Self-released

=== With Silent Horror ===
Album	Year	Style	Format	Label
Silent Horror	2014	Studio album	Vinyl (12"); CD; Digital	No Balls Records; Evil Shed Music

=== Featured compilations ===
Title	Year	Album
"Save Me Tonight"	2016	Horrorhound Presents: It's Only a Movie
"Shadow of the Vampire"	2017	Sonic Seducer Cold Hands Seduction Vol. 193
"The Brides"	2017	Ox Compilation #134
"In Votive Light"	2017	Sonic Seducer Cold Hands Seduction Vol. 195

=== Various appearances ===
Year	Artist	Album
2006	The Cryptkeeper Five	Darker Days
2006	The Cryptkeeper Five	The Rise of Palace Depression
2007	The Serpenteens	The Superhuman Monstershow
2007	The Epidemic	Quarantine Days
2008	The Spook	Let There Be Dark
2008	The Crimson Ghosts	Dead Eyes Can See
2010	The Crimson Ghosts	Generation Gore
2011	The Cryptkeeper Five	The Unbeatable Cry
2014	Zombina and the Skeletones	Love Is Strange
2014	The Big Bad	The Big Bad
2015	Pyogenesis	A Century in the Curse of Time
2015	The Fright	Rising Beyond
2016	Bloodsucking Zombies from Outer Space	Bloody Unholy Christmas
2016	Bloodsucking Zombies from Outer Space	Mister Barlow
2016	1476	Smoke in the Sky
2018	The Crimson Ghosts	Yet Not Human
2024	A Murder of Crows	Ghouls, Gaels & Gaols EP

== See also ==
- Blitzkid Discography
