= List of horror punk bands =

This is a list of notable horror punk bands.

- 45 Grave
- Aiden
- AFI
- Argyle Goolsby
- Ashestoangels
- Balzac
- Blitzkid
- Calabrese
- Christian Death
- Creeper
- The Creepshow
- The Cryptkeeper Five
- Death Wolf
- DieMonsterDie
- Doyle
- Dr. Chud's X-Ward
- Energy
- Flesh Roxon
- Frankenstein Drag Queens from Planet 13
- Gorgeous Frankenstein
- Gotham Road
- Grave Robber
- The Groovie Ghoulies
- Korol i Shut
- Haunted Garage
- Misfits
- Miss Vincent
- Mister Monster
- Mourning Noise
- Murderdolls
- Nekromantix
- The Nerve Agents
- Nim Vind
- The Other
- Our Time Down Here
- Salem
- Samhain
- Schoolyard Heroes
- Screaming Dead
- Son of Sam
- Stellar Corpses
- Tiger Army
- TSOL
- The Undead
- Wednesday 13
- The Young Werewolves
- Zombina and the Skeletones

== See also ==
- List of psychobilly bands
