= Graves (band) =

American horror punk band

- Origin: New Jersey, U.S.
- Genre: Horror punk
- Years active: 2000–2002
- Label: GDU Records
- Past members: Michale Graves; Dr. Chud; Tom Logan (Tom Hatziemanouel); Left Hand Graham

Graves was an American horror punk band formed in 2000 by Michale Graves and Dr. Chud after they left the Misfits. Graves recorded and released one album, Web of Dharma, which was produced by Dr. Chud.

== Recordings ==
The band also recorded a demo before Web of Dharma, which was never officially released. Demos for Web Of Dharma were recorded in November 2001. These recordings were produced by Ron Gouldie at June 3 Studios in Los Angeles.

The recording sessions for Web of Dharma occurred in April 2002 at Spin Studios in Long Island, New York. Overdubbing sessions and final mixing took place in the "Creepy Attic", Dr. Chud's home studio.

A special limited edition of this album was sold at the record release party. The number of copies pressed is still unknown. Seemingly the only difference between the limited edition and the regular edition, is the artwork on the CD itself. Limited edition CD artwork contains the Grave Diggers Union logo. The album's artwork was done by James Rowe.

In September 2002, the band broke up. Michale Graves went on to form a new band, Gotham Road, Dr. Chud formed his new band, Dr. Chud's X-Ward, Graham played briefly with Let It Burn, and Tom Logan joined the band Professional Murder Music.

== Final lineup ==
- Michale Graves – vocals, guitar
- Tom Logan (Tom Hatziemanouel) – lead guitar, backing vocals
- Left Hand Graham – bass, backing vocals
- Dr. Chud – drums, backing vocals

== Discography ==
- Web of Dharma, GDU Records, 2002
