= 1476 (band) =

American musical duo

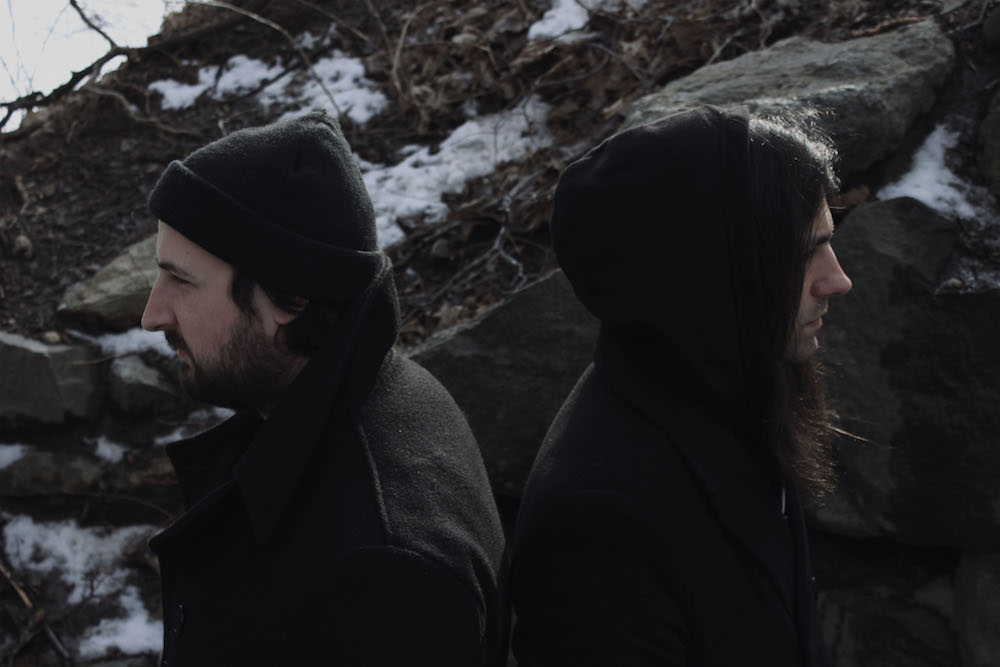
- 1476 art rock duo, Robb Kavjian and Neil DeRosa

Background information
- Origin: Salem, Massachusetts, United States
- Genres: Art rock, post-black metal, neofolk, post-punk, dark ambient
- Years active: 2007–present
- Labels: Prophecy Productions, Seraphim House
- Members: Robb Kavjian; Neil DeRosa
- Website: 1476cult.com

1476 is an atmospheric art rock duo based out of Salem, Massachusetts. Founded in 2007 by Robb Kavjian and Neil DeRosa, together they began writing songs which include various themes of Western esoterica, pre-Christian mythology/mysticism, chaos magic, nature, and philosophical themes. They had decided from the beginning to avoid confining themselves to a specific genre and when pressed by interviewers to define their style, they responded with the term, "Hermetic Death Rock."

== History ==
=== Early years (2007–2010) ===
The band released their first effort, A Wolf's Age, in 2010 with former bass player Steve Matthews (Argyle Goolsby). Steve joined the duo and wrote the song, "Closed Casket Heart", which was subsequently added as the last track for the album and contributed to backing vocals. After the recording sessions, they went separate ways after the band realized they had differing ideas for the future and for the direction of the music. A Wolf's Age was discontinued and deleted from the band's catalogue in January 2015.

=== First works (2010–2014) ===
In 2010, Smoke in the Sky was shortly released after A Wolf's Age with an accompanying live album, Live. July 17th 2010. Unity, MA. Smoke in the Sky was a clear departure from their first effort and was described as gloomy and subdued, much like Mark Lanegan's early work.

In 2012, Wildwood was released along with a sister EP, The Nightside. The theme of the album was a general commentary on the concept of human nature and predominantly used nature-based imagery throughout the album artwork. The music itself combined European folk, '70s prog, and metal influences to create a dark and cinematic experience that evokes the occult aspects of historical New England.

In 2014, the band ventured into soundtrack work with Edgar Allan Poe: A Life of Hope & Despair. The album was used as a neoclassical and experimental soundtrack to an Edgar Allan Poe based art show in Salem, Massachusetts. A Life of Hope & Despair explored the melancholic and quaint life, love, and death of Edgar Allan Poe himself that you can feel as the album progresses.

=== Prophecy Productions (2016) ===
In 2016, Prophecy Productions signed 1476, heralding them as "America's best kept secret in the realm of dark, atmospheric Art Rock" and gained the attention of media outlets around the world proclaiming, "Prophecy Productions has found a golden nugget with 1476.". In preparation of the band's upcoming release, Our Season Draws Near, Prophecy reissued 1476's entire back-catalogue and released their first available vinyl, the Wildwood / The Nightside reissue. Wildwood / The Nightside was met with critical acclaim and was "recommended to all those wanting to discover this rare and precious duo, between strange neofolk and melancholy post-punk". The reissued albums from Prophecy brought 1476 out of the underground and they gained popularity for their unique sound. "It's a fortune be aware of groups like the 1476 because the challenge to be original and coherent is not always easy but they succeed in an exemplary manner."

=== Our Season Draws Near (2017) ===
In 2017, the band released Our Season Draws Near, their first album with Prophecy Productions. It uses a strong winter theme that captures the dreary, haunting and foreboding atmospheres of coastal New England. It is their heaviest sounding album to date that showcases raw, honest, and personal emotions that are dedicated to solitude and its lessons. Our Season Draws Near received exceptional praise, being called "a wild-card folk/atmospheric metal force" while the album is hailed as, "a record that can't help but to keep you in a constant state of thrall". It was produced by the band and mixed by Markus Siegenhort from the post-black metal driving force Lantlôs.

1476 assembled their first touring lineup in 2017.

== Name origin ==
"1476" is in specific reference to a song previously written by its founder, Robb Kavjian, but chosen for its overall ambiguity that allows the band musical freedom. The nature of the name being a year is that it predates the discovery of America and implies a European origin. "The past is important to us because it is completely subjective. It allows the imagination to truly dream. All we have are fragments of words and images from the past collected and recorded by people subjectively. There's something very compelling about this for me—to reach into these fragmented images from the past and to reconstruct them subjectively. There is something dreamlike and "lost in time" about it which is something I always want to capture musically."

== Musical style ==
The music of 1476 structurally combines elements of folk and black metal, moody indie rock, neo-folk, neoclassical, and post-punk. The nature of their music is largely dictated by the concept and theme of their albums.

Prophecy Productions describes their own as, "isolationist sound stories: musically and attitudinally coming from a punk/DIY background, they arguably absorbed all genres of guitar-heavy and atmospheric music there ever was since—including sub-genres of metal, neofolk, and ambient." Others have said their music captures the essence of New England's 'aura' or character and that the two-piece band reinvents itself with each release.

1476 has been compared to sonically akin to bands such as Agalloch, Ulver, or Amebix that share a background in making their own way in creating heavy, dark, and atmospheric music that is enhanced by rich esoteric/spiritual concepts.

== Members ==
- Robb Kavjian
- Neil DeRosa

== Discography ==
=== Studio albums ===
- A Wolf's Age (2010) Discontinued
- Wildwood (2012) Reissued in 2016
- Edgar Allan Poe: A Life of Hope & Despair (2014) Reissued in 2016
- Wildwood/The Nightside (2016) Reissue
- Our Season Draws Near (2017)
- "In Exile" (2023)

=== EPs ===
- Smoke in the Sky (2010) Reissued in 2016
- The Nightside (2012) Reissued in 2016

=== Live albums ===
- Live. July 17th 2010. Unity, MA. (2010) Reissued in 2016
