= Argyle Goolsby =

American singer and bassist (born 1979)

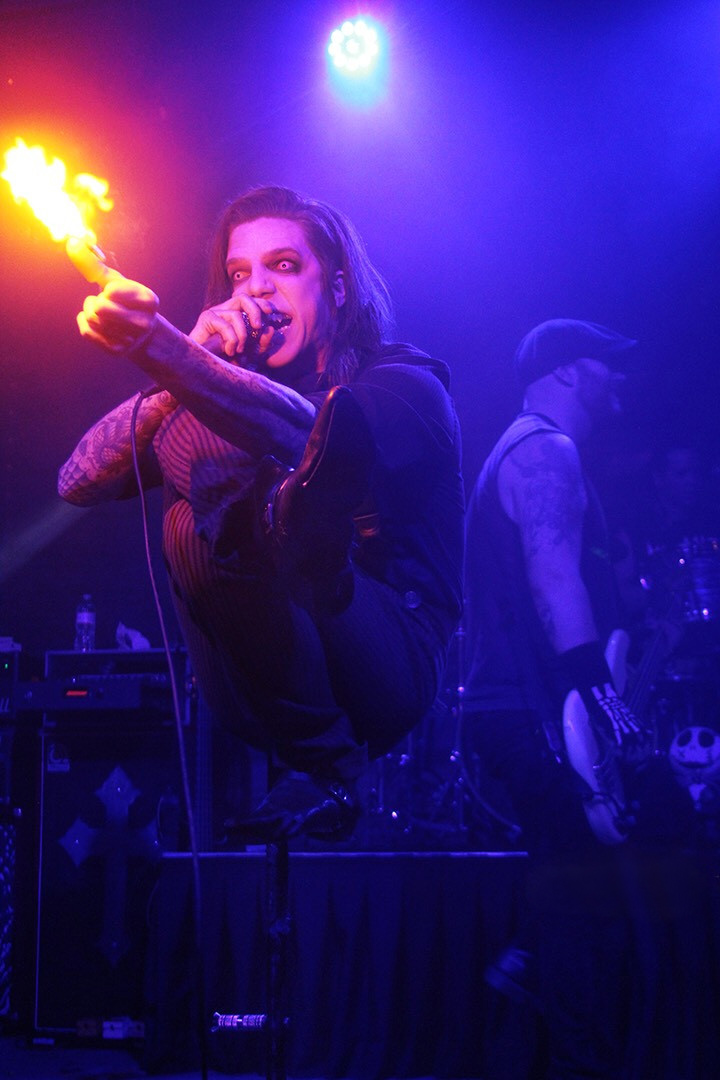
- Goolsby performing with The Roving Midnight in 2018

Background information
- Born: Steve Matthews; September 15, 1978 (age 48); Bluefield, West Virginia, U.S.
- Genres: Horror punk; punk rock; death rock; heavy metal
- Occupations: Singer; musician; songwriter; tattoo artist
- Instruments: Vocals; bass
- Years active: 1997–present
- Label: A Corpse with No Name
- Website: argylegoolsby.com

Argyle Goolsby (born Steve Matthews; September 15, 1978) is an American musician, best known for being the lead vocalist, bassist and co-founder of horror punk band Blitzkid (1997–present).

When Blitzkid disbanded in 2012, Goolsby pursued a career as a solo artist as Argyle Goolsby. He performs with both his live electric band, The Roving Midnight, as well as his fully acoustic band, The Hollow Bodies.

== Career ==
=== Blitzkid (1997–2012) ===
Goolsby was born in Bluefield, West Virginia. In 1997, Goolsby and lead guitarist and vocalist T.B. Monstrosity (Tracy Byrd) started the punk rock band Blitzkid. Drawing their inspiration from B-movies and horror movie classics, the band was soon considered to belong to the subgenre of horror punk, which emerged in the wake of the Misfits.

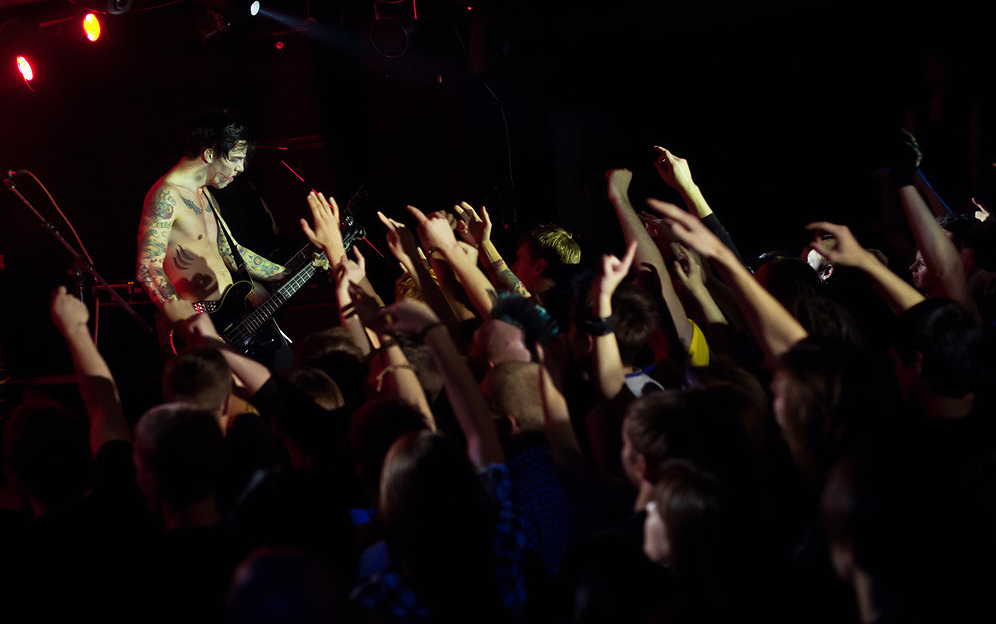
Goolsby performing with Blitzkid at Club Relax in Moscow, October 2012

In the 2000s, Blitzkid developed an underground following in the US and especially in Europe. Most of the band's albums were released through German horror punk group The Other's label, FiendForce Records.

Between 1997 and 2012, Goolsby recorded seven studio albums with Blitzkid and several split EPs. Many of the group's songs were featured on horror punk compilations in the 2000s, such as Mullets & Alcoholics (SFL Records, 2003), Flesheaters! (1332 Records, 2006), Gothic Compilation Part XLII (Batbeliever Releases, 2008), Get Acquainted Vol. 1 (THENEXTART, 2008) or The Sound of Horror Vol. 1 (Robot Monster, 2010).

With Blitzkid, Goolsby has toured in 29 countries, played over 700 shows and performed with several other bands and artists like Nim Vind, Stellar Corpses, The Cryptkeeper Five, The Damned, Leftöver Crack, The Crimson Ghosts, Strung Out and Face to Face. Biltzkid was also part of many festivals and music events such as the Summer Breeze Open Air, the M'era Luna Festival or the Amphi Festival.

On November 10, 2012, during their final "Return to the Living Tour", Blitzkid played their last concert in Düsseldorf, Germany.

When questioned about the band's retirement, Goolsby stated:

"It is not that we don't believe in what we are doing anymore. It's not that Blitzkid has become a burden. I have still plenty of music that I have written and that I am currently writing. Our music is not an extinguished flame. Retirement is more of a practical decision for right now."

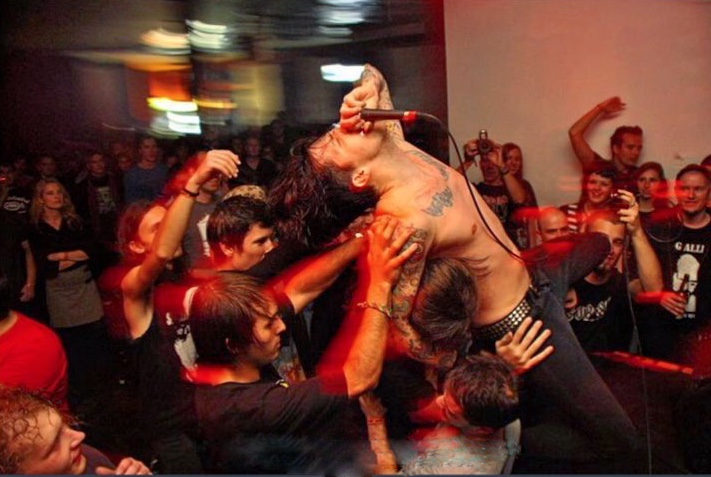
Goolsby performing with Blitzkid in Transylvania at Gambrinis in Cluj Napoca, Romania, October 2012

In November 2016, Jeff Frumess filmed a documentary titled Blitzkid: Return to the Living, which includes a part on the history of the band and two others that are dedicated respectively to the group's experience on the road and some live performances. The documentary was co-written and produced by Goolsby.

=== Notable collaborations ===
While remaining in Blitzkid, Goolsby collaborated on several occasions with former members of the Misfits. In 2002, Goolsby played bass as a tour member for The Undead, a horror punk band led by Bobby Steele (the second guitarist of the Misfits original lineup).

The following year, he recorded three bass tracks on Diagnosis for Death (2003), an album released by Dr. Chud (ex-Misfits drummer of the Michale Graves Era) with his new band named Dr. Chud's X-Ward. Goolsby was also a tour member for Chud's band

In 2004, Goolsby collaborated with Mister Monster, performing back vocal duties and playing bass on the Deep Dark EP (Hell's Hundred Records). Following the departure of Wednesday 13's bassist Kid Kid in 2006, Goolsby was hired as a replacing bassist to fill in for three shows.

In 2007, ex-Misfits lead guitarist Doyle Wolfgang von Frankenstein was looking for a vocalist for his solo band project, Gorgeous Frankenstein and finally recruited Landon Blood for the recording of an eponymous album. Blood left the band shortly after and was replaced by Argyle Goolsby who played bass and performed vocal duties for Gorgeous Frankenstein first tour, opening for Danzig. Dr. Chud (drums) and Stephanie Bellars (a.k.a. Gorgeous George, Doyle's ex-wife) were also part of this line up.

In 2009, Goolsby took part of what is sometimes referred as the Misfits "Near-Reunion" in New Jersey. Performing as an opening act for Danzig, this lineup included Doyle Wolfgang von Frankenstein (lead guitar), Dr. Chud (drums), Michale Graves (vocals) and Goolsby (bass) (Jerry Only, the Misfits original bassist, did not participate in the event).

Goolsby had written many songs that he intended to work on with Gorgeous Frankenstein, but since the band project was abandoned, most of this material became part of Blitzkid's last album, Apparitional. From the ashes of Gorgeous Frankenstein, Doyle Wolfgang von Frankenstein founded a new horror metal band eponymously named Doyle with vocalist Alex Story in 2012.

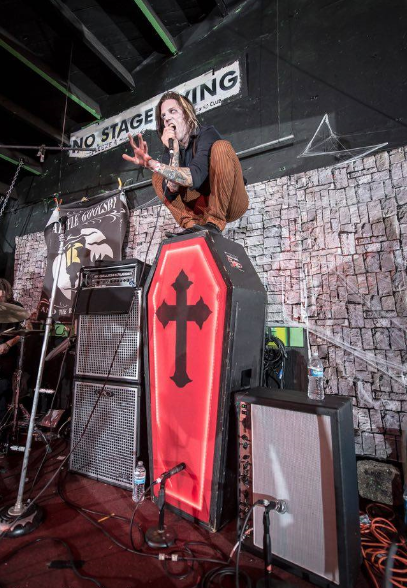
Goolsby performing at Gilman (924 Gilman Street – Alternative Music Foundation) in Berkeley, California, November 2016

=== Recent projects (2012–2017) ===
Following Blitkid's disestablishment in 2012, Goolsby started a solo career with a new band project named Argyle Goolsby and the Roving Midnight. He has been steadily releasing EPs and singles since 2012. In 2015, a compilation album, Saturnalia of the Accursed which collects two EPs and a few other songs was released as well as a cover of "Save Me Tonight" by White Sister, originally featured on the soundtrack of Fright Night (1985)."

In 2016, Goolsby started a series of concert with a fully acoustic band, The Hollow Bodies, playing both his own material and some Blitzkid songs.

=== Calabrese (2024–present) ===
On 14th of April 2024 Calabrese announced that Argyle Goolsby was joining the band.

== Inspiration and songwriting ==
Goolsby has always been fascinated by cryptozoological monsters, Horror movies and horror fiction, which are the core inspiration for his songwriting as well as folklore and ghost stories (especially those native to his home in Appalachia).

His work is also inspired by the aesthetics of the Gilded Age, German Expressionist films and the era of silent cinema in general.

His lyrics deal with real-world subjects projected through horror-themed metaphors, a writing style he acknowledges being influence by the Misfits.

For Goolsby, horror is not only an inspiration, but it is also a lifestyle, an aesthetic approach that focuses on "a conjured presence". In this respect, during his live performances, he is often disguised as a monster, personifying a vampire or a zombie.

If shocking can be considered as a major aspect of Goolsby's songwriting and style, it is also part of his own reflection on horror as a means of expression. As he suggests it himself:

"If you really stop to think about it, a lot of the monsters aren't really the monsters, it is man that's the monster. So a lot of horror movies are social commentaries in a way, which is what punk rock is. So a really nice blend of metaphor and humanity for the most part and that's what I like the most about it. I like the duality of man, you can be a monster and you can be human. It's just all wrapped together."

== Musical instruments ==
Goolsby has a copyrighted bass design called "The Haxxan" (Iron Lung Guitars, England), a name that refers to Häxan, a Danish silent horror movie, but he is most noted for his use of a Fender Aerodyne bass and a Telefunken M80 chrome microphone. He also makes use of "The Levitation Station" during his live performances. This personal invention can be described as a custom microphone stand on which he can climb and hover, giving the illusion of floating.

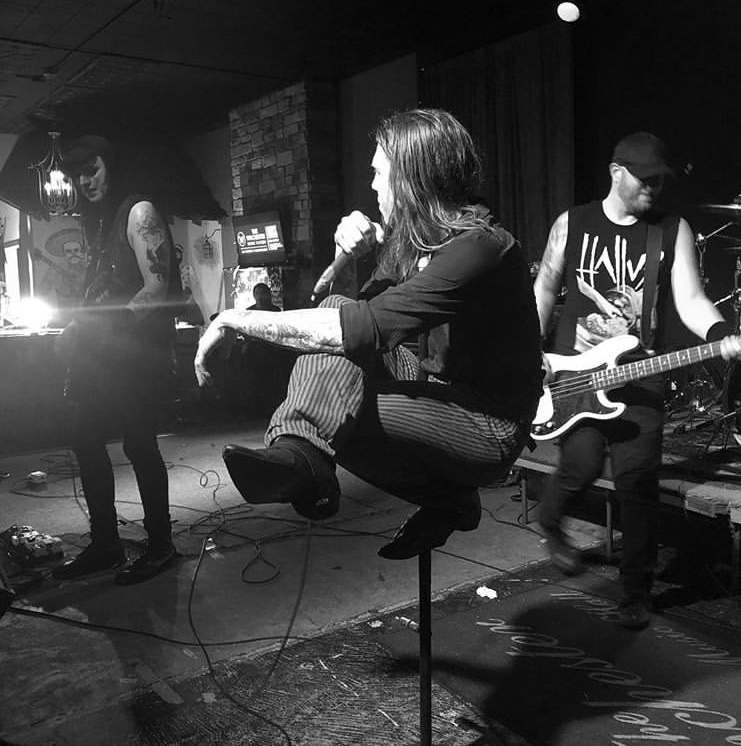
Goolsby on The Levitation Station at The Winchester in Cleveland, October 2018

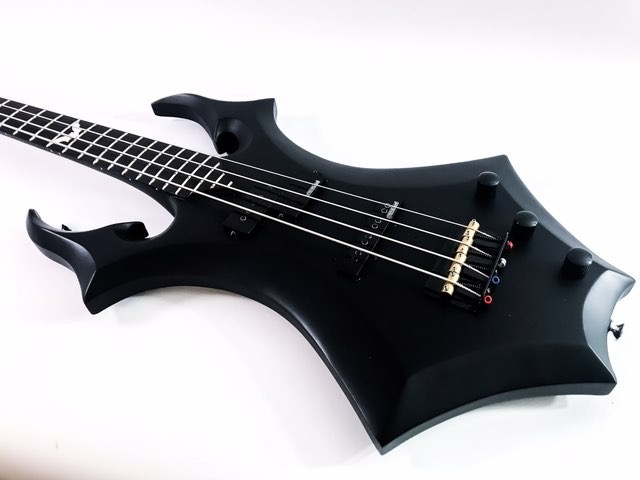
The Haxxan, detail

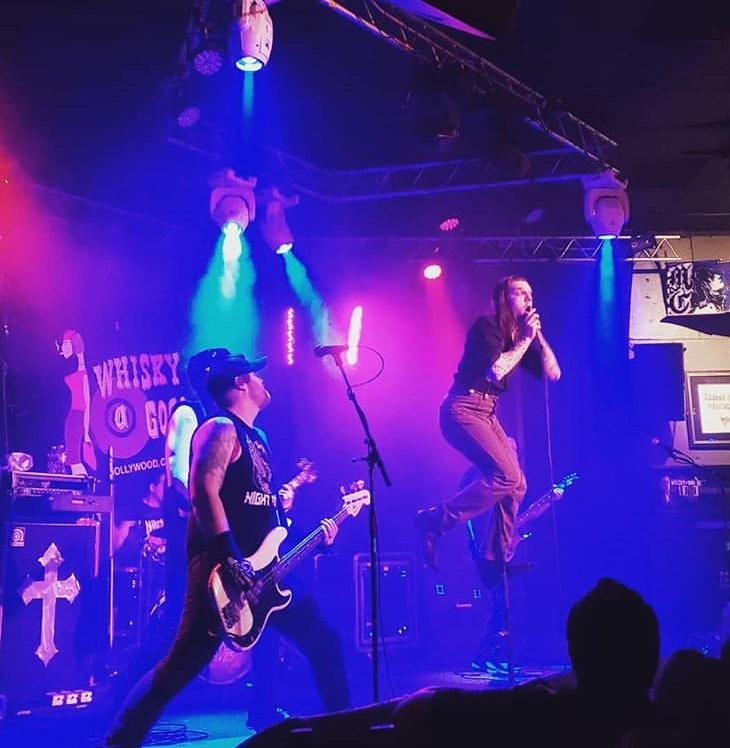
Goolsby high atop the Levitation Station at the Whisky a Go Go in Los Angeles, October 2018

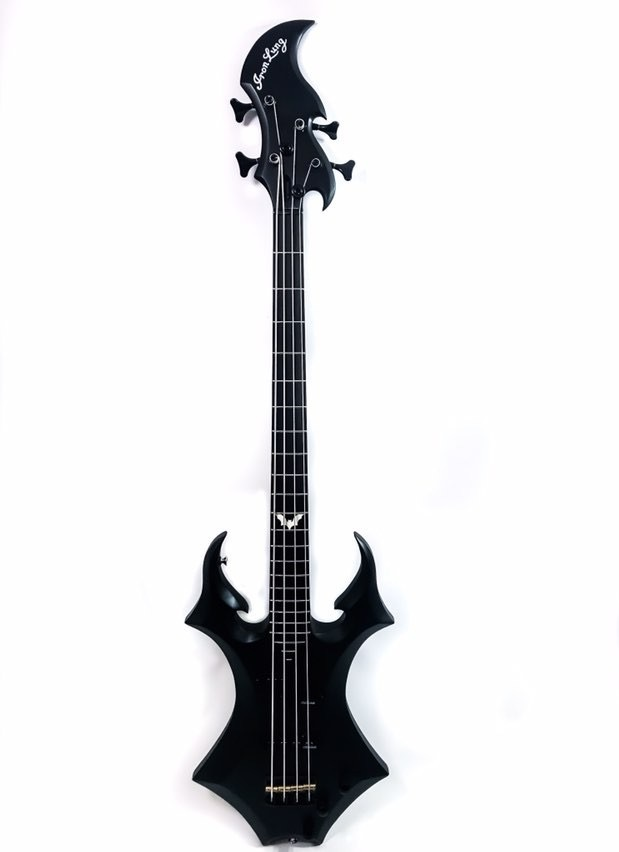
The Haxxan, complete design

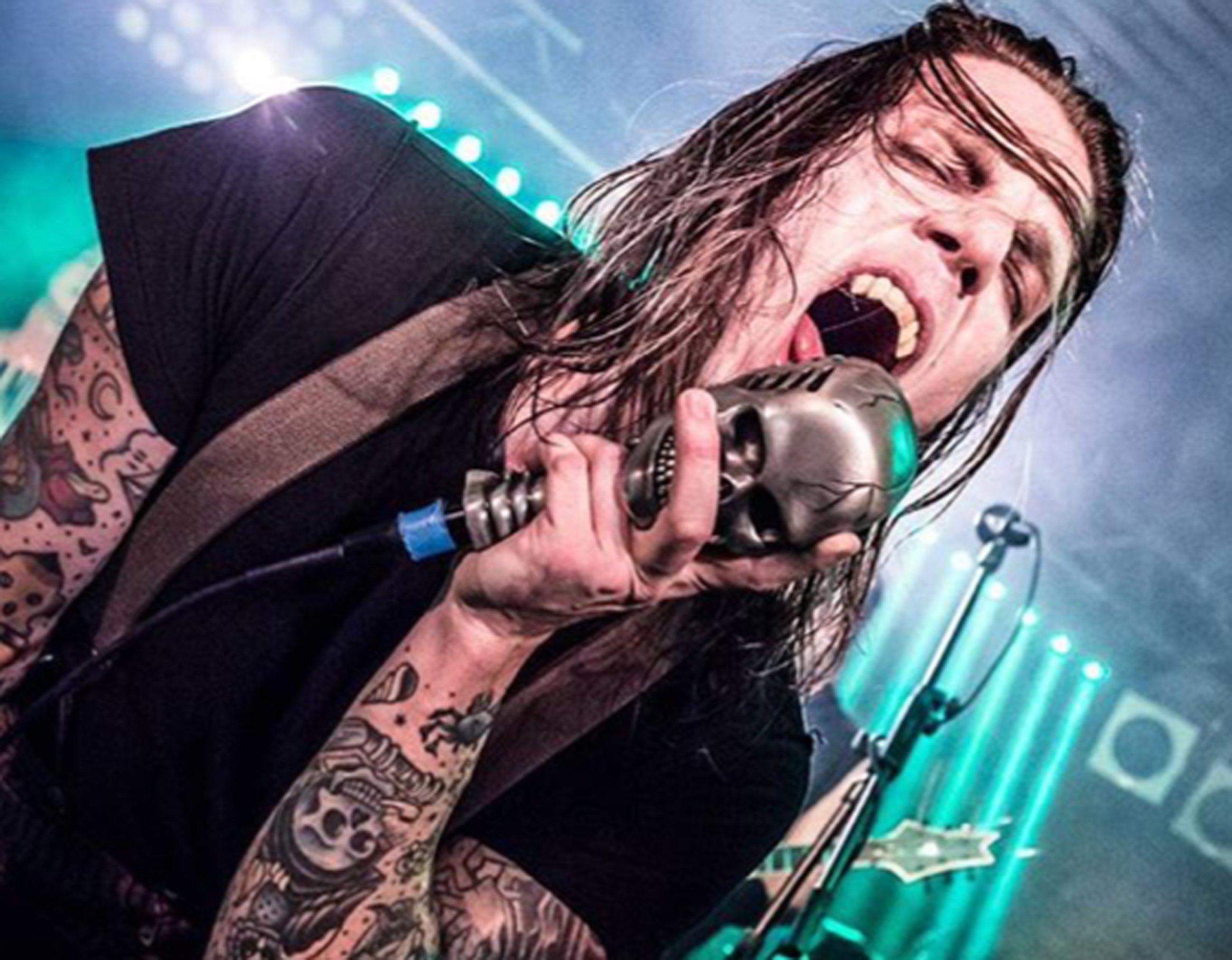
Goolsby with his custom Skull Mic in Germany, 2017

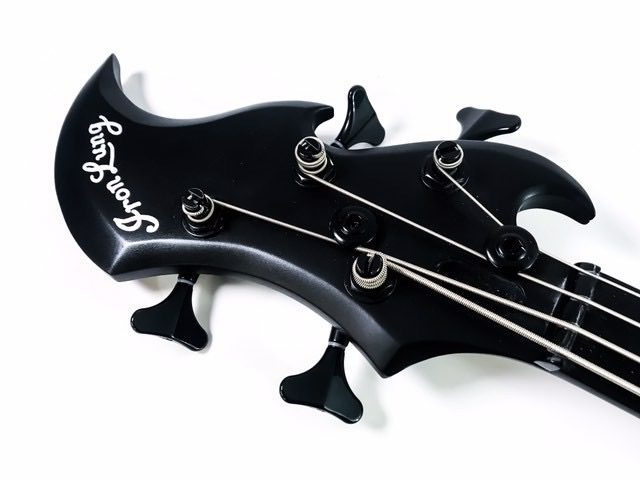
The Haxxan, Iron Lung logo

== Musicians (The Roving Midnight) ==
- Johnny Ott – guitar/backup vocals
- Shadow Windhawk (Noah Bailey) – guitar/backup vocals
- Mike Groch – bass/backup vocals
- Dave Noonan – drums
- Marc Poulin – drums
- Andrew Winter – drums
- Adam Parent – drums
- Tony Kirkham – drums
- Willie Wolfbite – bass
- Howie Wowie – bass
- Emilio Menze – bass
- Gozer – guitar
- Carlos "Loki" Cofino – guitar
- Jimmy Ray Harrington – guitar
- Nate Bane – guitar
- Jason Trioxin – guitar
- Nick Arabatzis – keyboards
- Jack Deskins – keyboards/saxophone

== Personal life ==
Aside from his musical career, Goolsby also works as a tattoo artist in his hometown of Bluefield. As an ordained minister, he offers his services to officiate wedding ceremonies or provide live entertainment through GigSalad, an online marketplace for booking entertainment and services for events.

Goolsby runs his own label and publishing company, A Corpse with No Name Productions (A.C.W.N.N.), located in New Milford, Connecticut.

He married his longtime girlfriend Jordan Paoletta on October 21, 2017. The service was officiated by Victoria Price at Witch's Dungeon Classic Movie Museum in Bristol, Connecticut.

== Discography ==
=== Blitzkid (1997–2012) ===
Albums

- Terrifying Tales – Death by Jersey, independent, 1999; A Corpse with No Name Music, 2006
- Let Flowers Die, Antidote Records, 2001
- Trace of a Stranger, Fiendforce Records, 2003
- Five Cellars Below, Fiendforce Records 2006
- Apparitional, People Like You Records, 2011

Split EPs, 7", 10"

- Blitzkid / Mister Monster, Exhuming Graves and Making Dates, EP, Fiendforce Records, 2004
- Blitzkid / The Spook, Everyday Is Halloween – Tales of Terror And Unspeakable Horror, 7", Fiendforce Records, 2004
- Blitzkid / The Cryptkeeper Five, No Balls Records, 2007
- Blitzkid / Nim Vind, Fistfull of Balls, Volume 1, 7" (2x), No Balls Records, 2010
- Blitzkid / The Cryptkeeper Five, Split Personalities, 10", The Black Sneer, 2012

Singles

- "Head Over Hills", 7", "I Used to Fuck People Like You in Prison" Records, 2011

Compilation

- Anatomy of Reanimation, Fiendforce Records, 2008

Video

- Terrifying Tales – Death by Jersey, A Corpse with No Name Music, 2006 (live at Connections in Clifton, New Jersey on May 28 and October 31, 2005)

=== Mister Monster ===
- Deep Dark (EP), 2003

=== Dr. Chud's X-Ward ===
- Dr. Chud's X-Ward, Diagnosis for Death, Bloodwork Records, 2004

=== 1476 ===
- A Wolf's Age, not on label, limited edition, 2009 (vocals, two songs written, credited as Steve Matthews)

=== Solo releases ===
- A Dream Not Quite Remembered..., EP, No Balls Records, 2012
- Under The Witness Stars, EP, A Corpse with No Name, 2013
- Argyle Goolsby / The Big Bad, The Wild And Woeful West Virginia, 7", A Corpse with No Name, 2013
- "Thickets", Single, A Corpse with No Name, 2015
- "Your Enemy's Best Friend", File, MP3, Single, A Corpse with No Name, 2015
- "Baskerville", Single, A Corpse with No Name, 2015
- Saturnalia of the Accursed, Compilation, No Balls Records/A Corpse with No Name, 2015 (Includes "The Being", a song inspired by the Flatwoods monster)
- Darken your Doorstep, A Corpse with No Name, 2017
- "Save Me Tonight", Single, A Corpse with No Name, 2017
- Hollow Bodies, A Corpse with No Name, 2018

=== Guest appearances ===
- Serpenteens, "Destroy Your World" (vocals), The Superhuman Monstershow, Blood and Guts Records, 2007
- The Spook, Let There Be Dark (vocals), Fiendfoce Records, 2008
- The Crimson Ghosts, Dead Eyes Can See (vocals), Fiendfoce Records, 2008
- The Crimson Ghosts, Generation Gore (vocals), Contra Light Records, 2010
- The Cryptkeeper Five, The Unbeatable Cry (vocals), The Cryptkeeper Five self-released, 2011
- Zombina and the Skeletones, "Love Is Strange" (vocals), Zombina and the Skeletones self-released, 2014
- The Big Bad, The Big Bad, (vocals), Digital release, 2014
- Pyogenesis, A Century in the Curse of Time (vocals), AFM Records, 2015
- The Fright, "Edward" (vocals), Rising Beyond, 7Hard, 2015
- Bloodsucking Zombies from Outer Space, Mister Barlow (vocals), Earthquake Files, 2016
- Mister Monster, Life at the end of October (bass/vocals), 2017 (upcoming album)

== Writing ==
- "Serpent on the Lace" (short story), in Becoming Nosferatu: Stories Inspired by Silent German Horror, edited by Matthew Sorrento and Gary D. Rhodes (BearManor Media, 2025).

== Films and videos ==
- Michael P. Russin, Blitzkid: Death by Jersey, 2009 (live at Connections in Clifton, New Jersey, on May 28 and October 31, 2005)
- You Must See It to Believe It!!!, Live, Evilive, 2010 (includes two videos ("Gorgeous Frankenstein" and "Man or Monster") and a 2008 tour documentary)
- Paul Basile, Living the American Nightmare, 2011 (documentary about Myke Hideous)
- Jeff Frumess, Blitzkid: Return to the Living, 2016
- Lloyd Kaufman, Shakespeare's Sh*tstorm, Troma Films, 2019

== Gallery ==
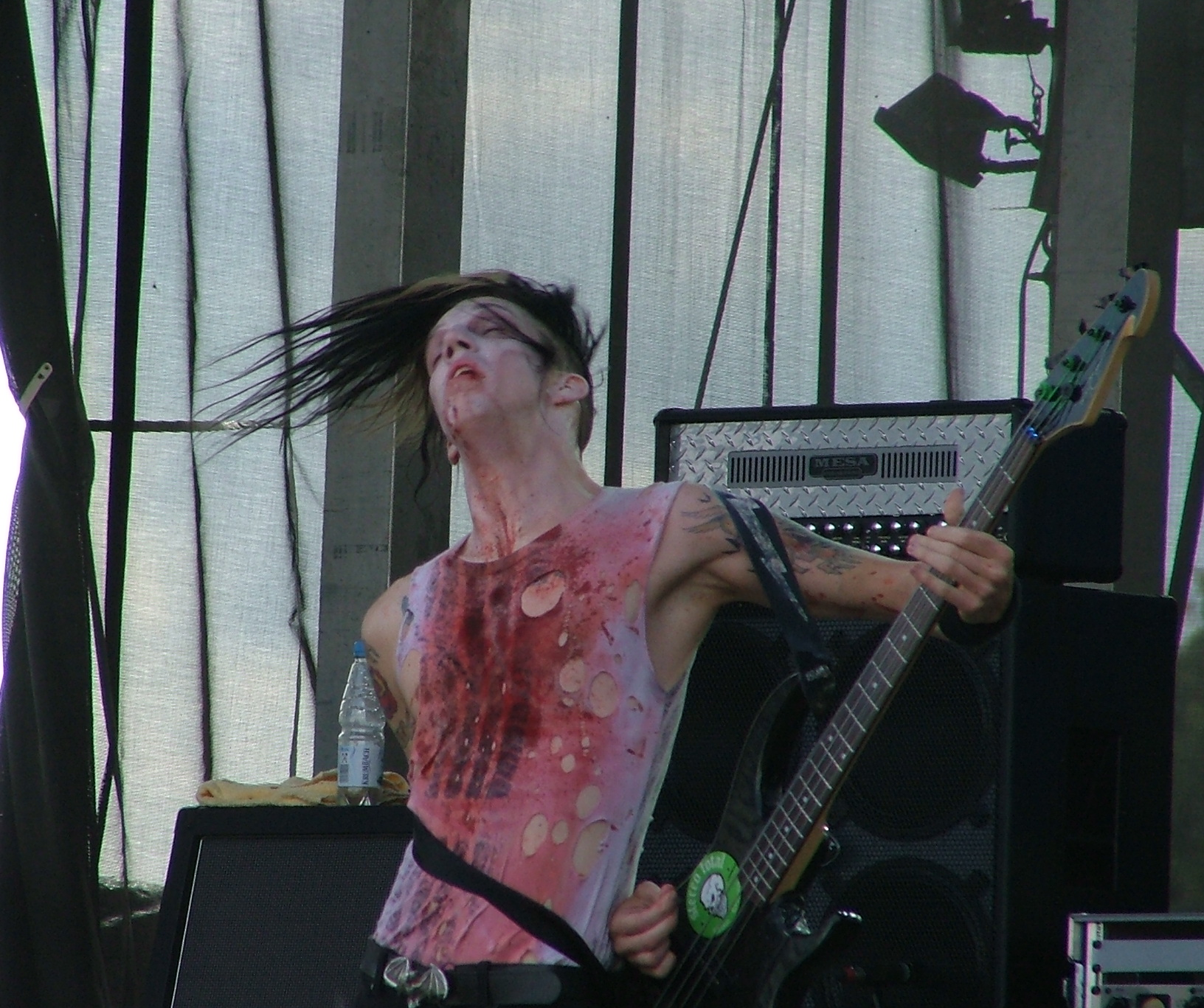
With Blitzkid at the Summer Breeze Open Air (August 2007)

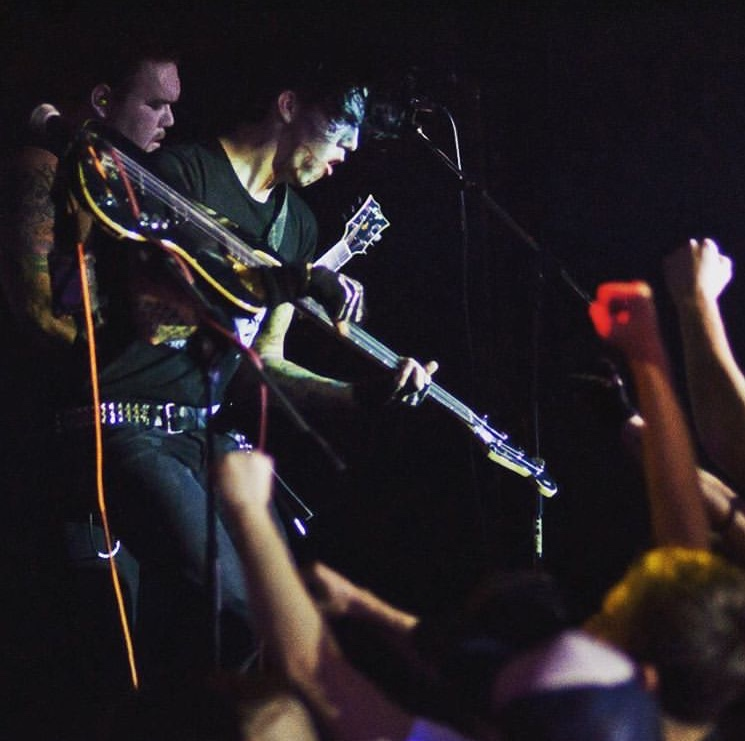
With Blizkid in Russia (2015)

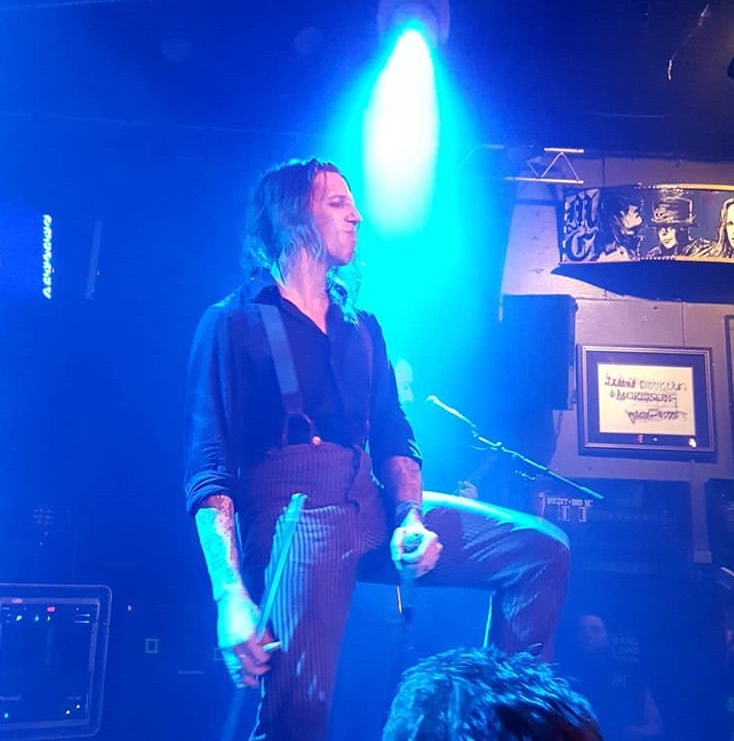
Performing at the Whisky a Go Go in Los Angeles (2018)

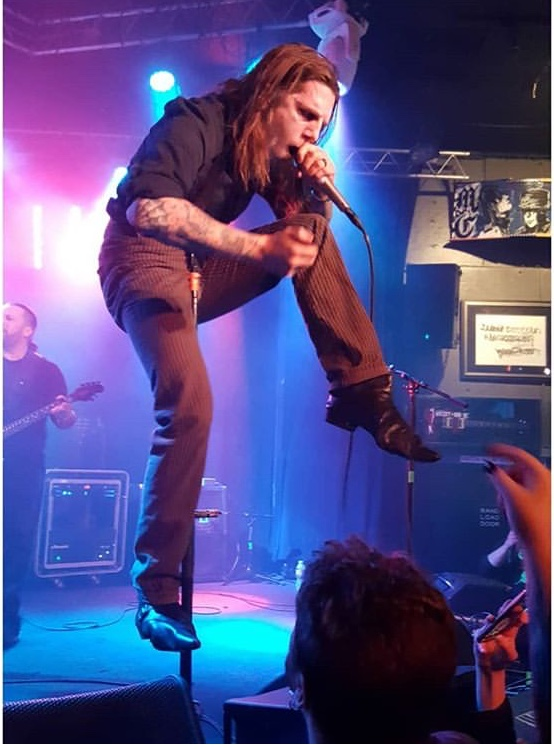
Performing at the Whisky a Go Go in Los Angeles (2018)

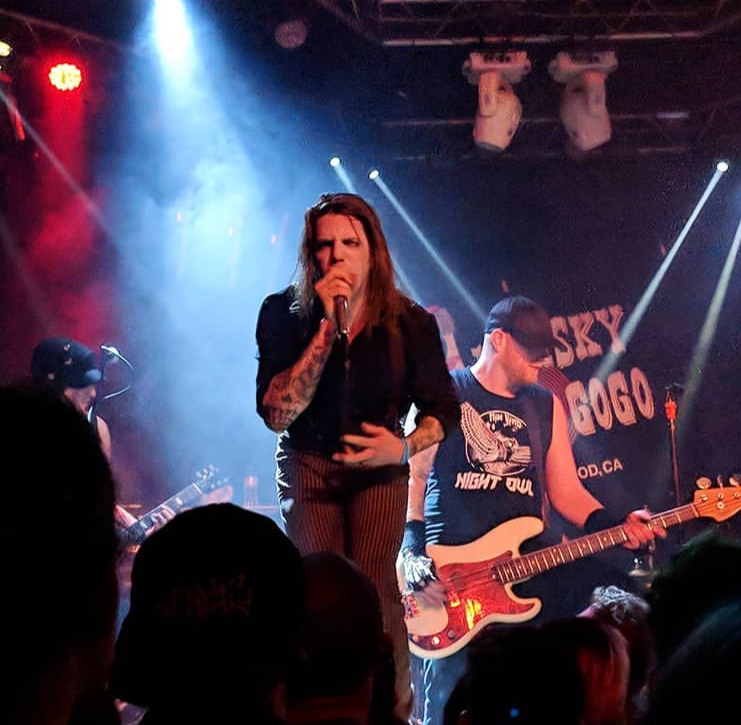
Performing at the Whisky a Go Go in Los Angeles (2018)

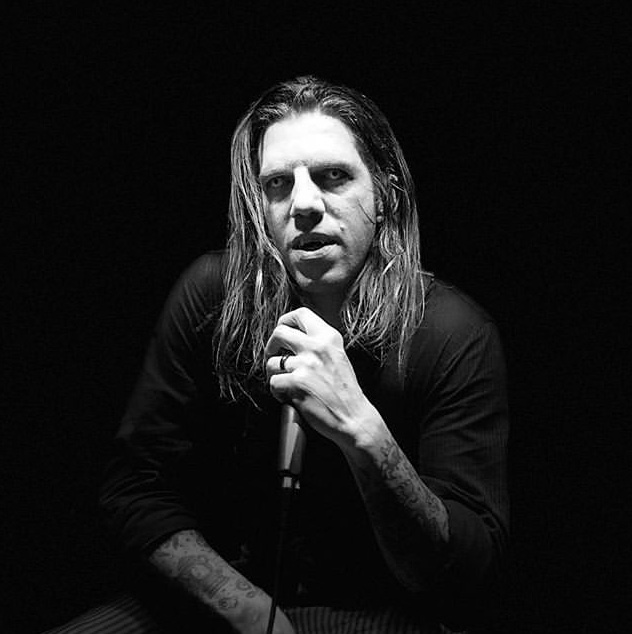
Performing in the US (2018)

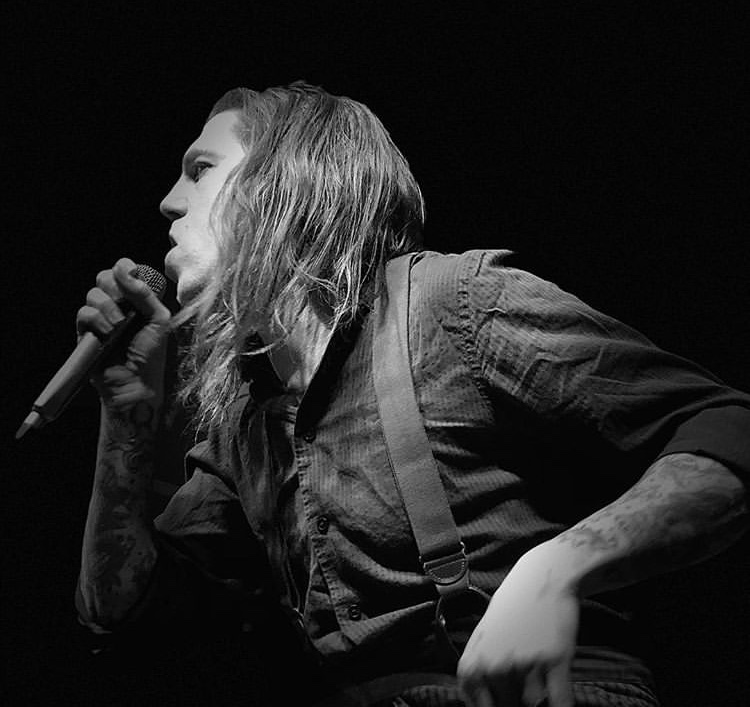
Performing in the US (2018)

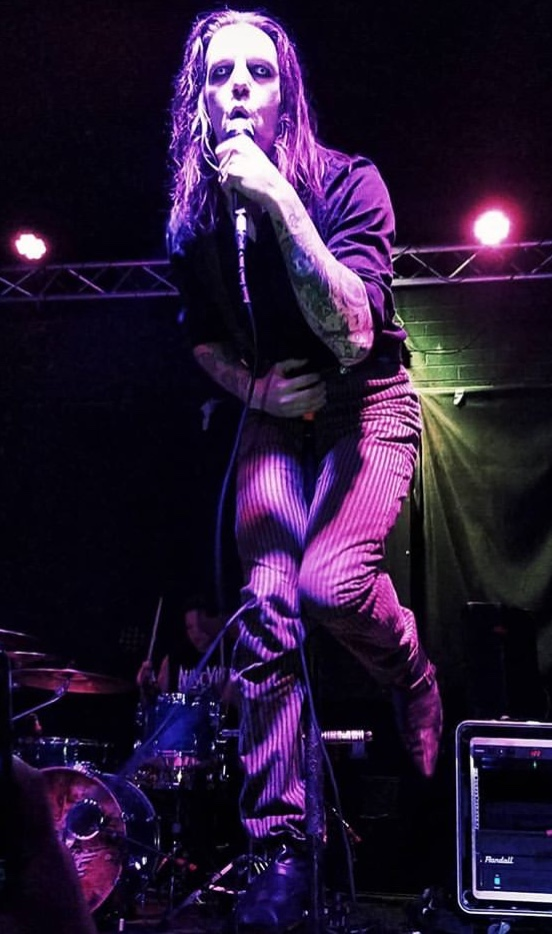
Performing in the US (2018)

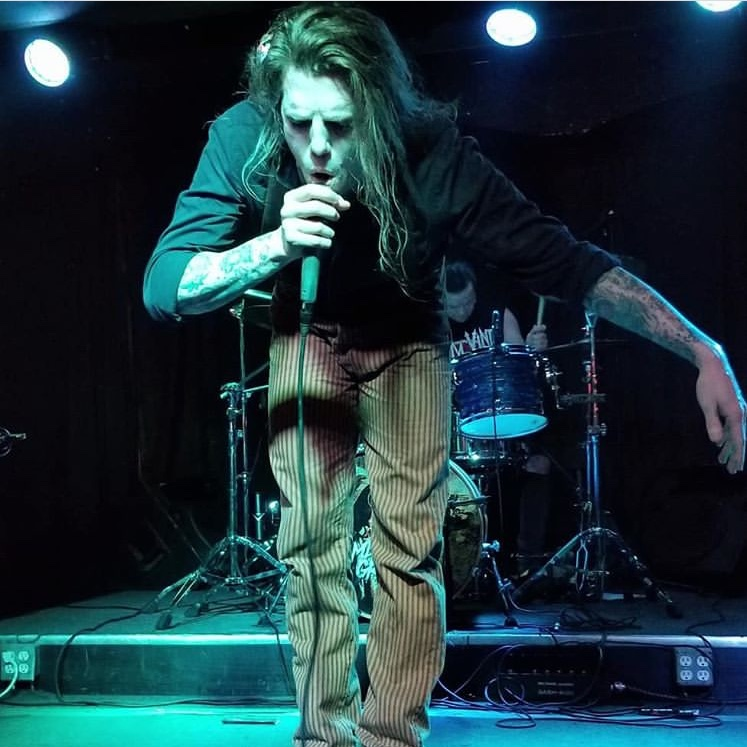
Performing in Tampa, Florida (2018)

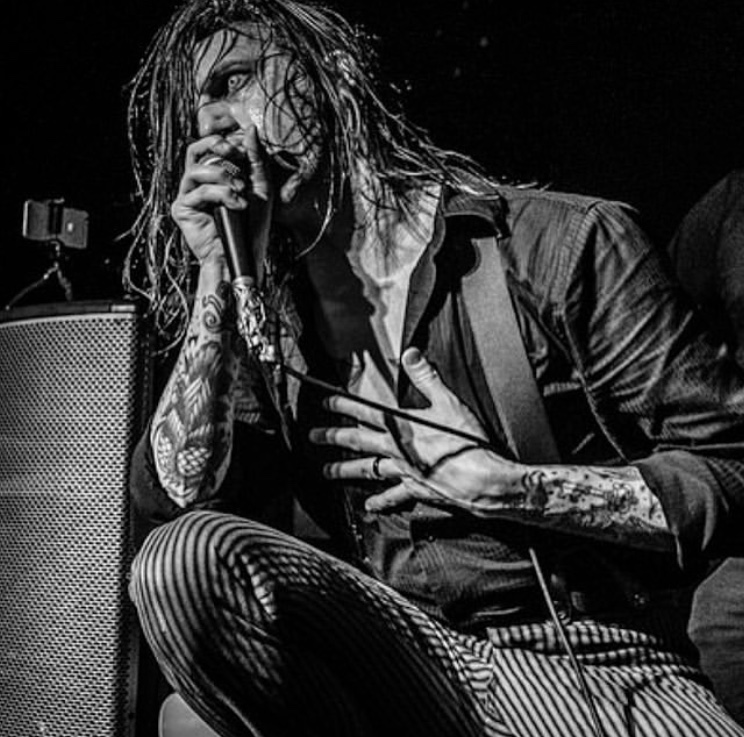
Performing at Savage Mountain Punk Fest (2018)

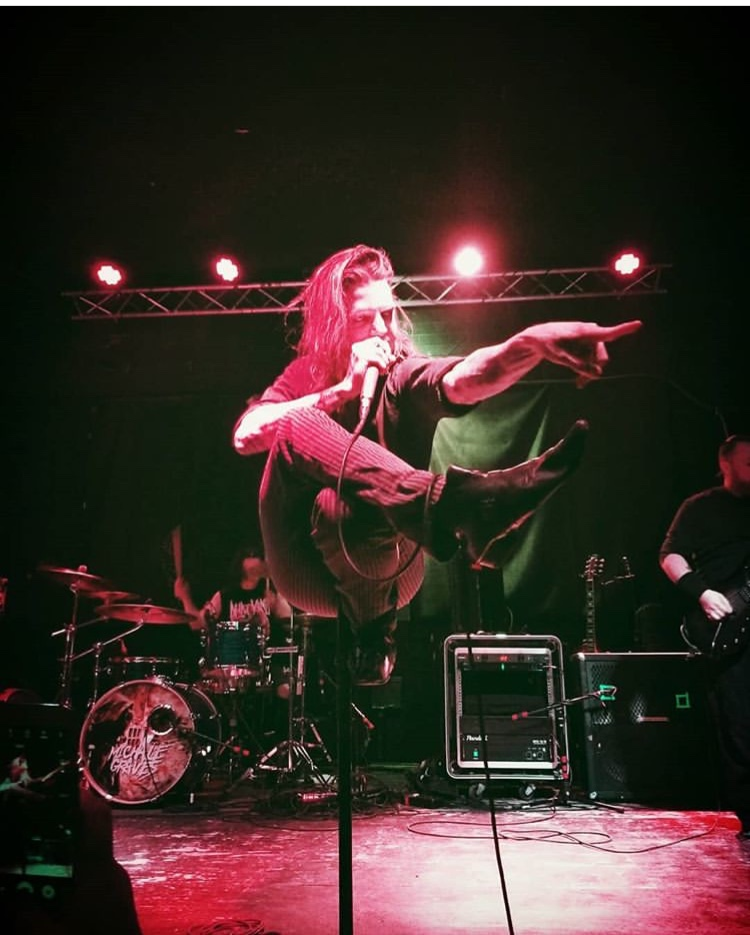
Performing at Club Red Mesa, Arizona (2018)

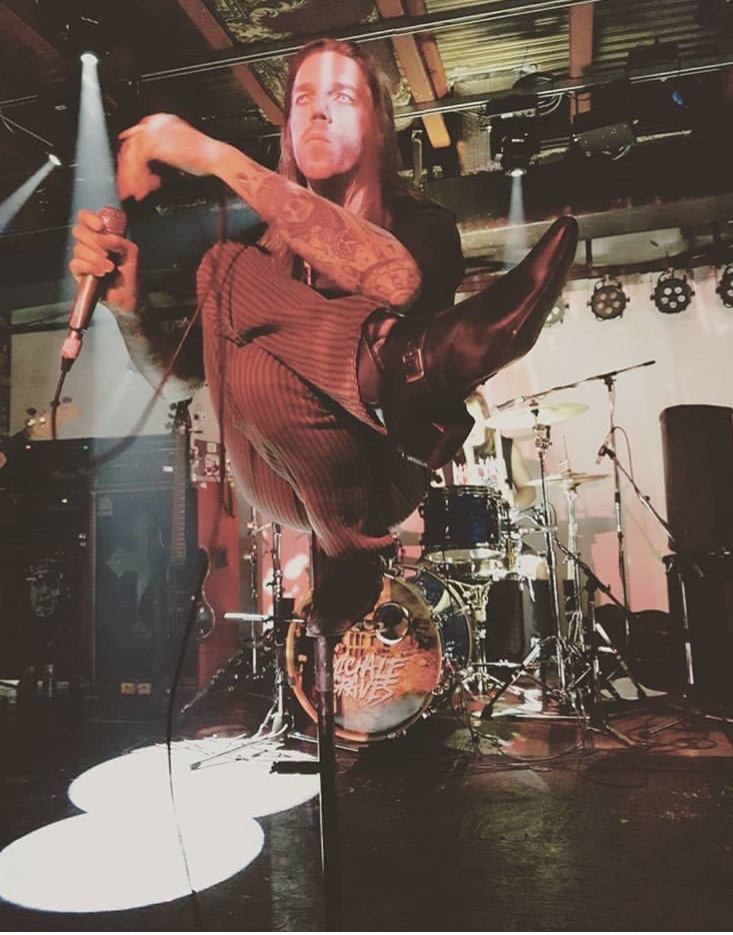
Performing in Calgary, Canada (2018)

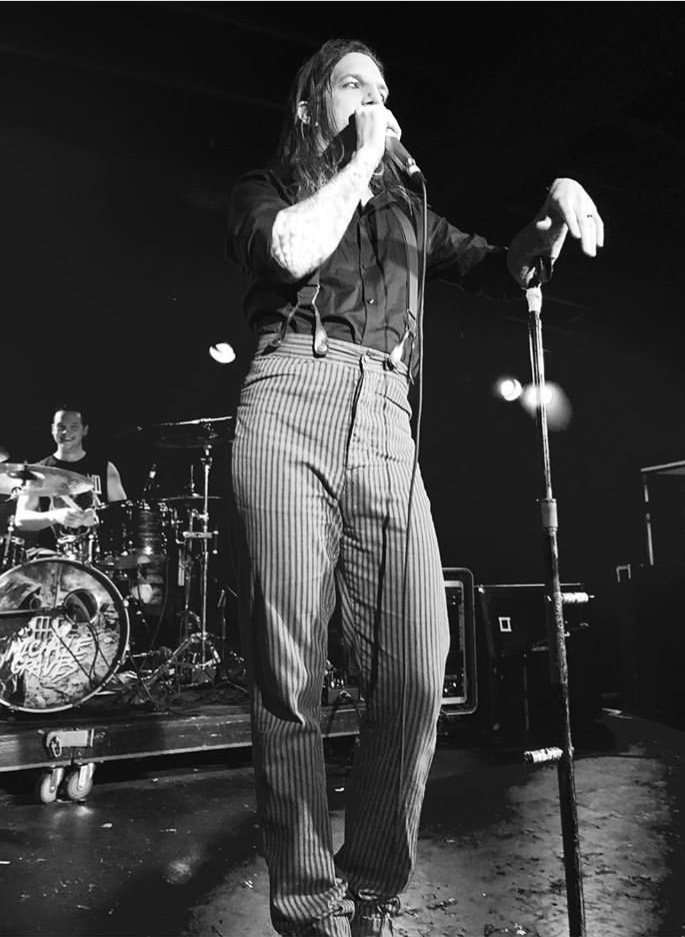
Performing at Brick by Brick, San Diego, California (2018)

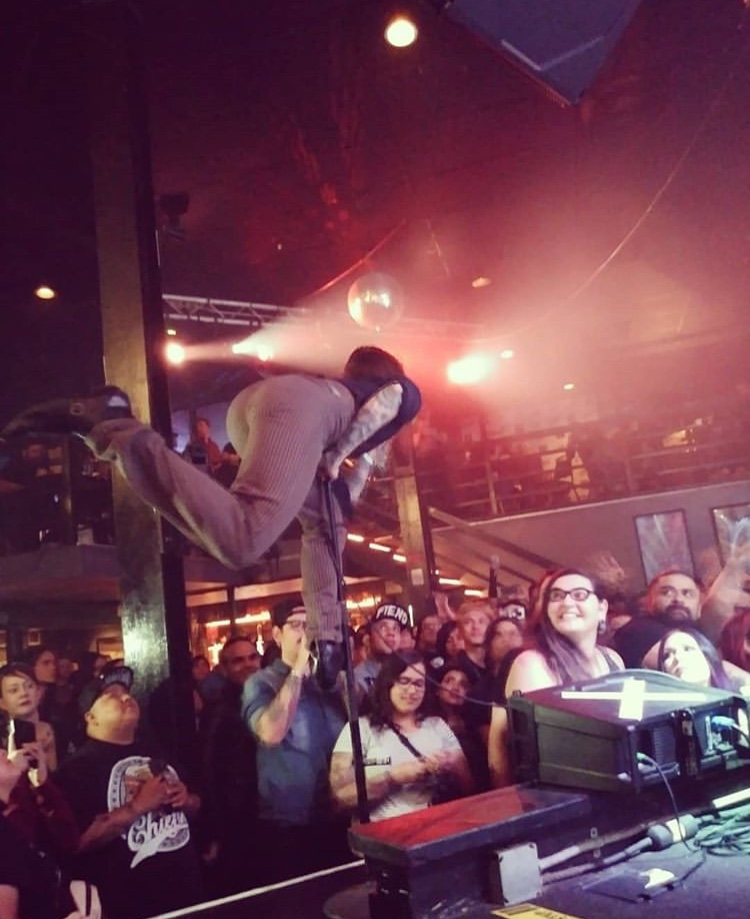
Performing at the Whisky a Go Go in Los Angeles (2018)

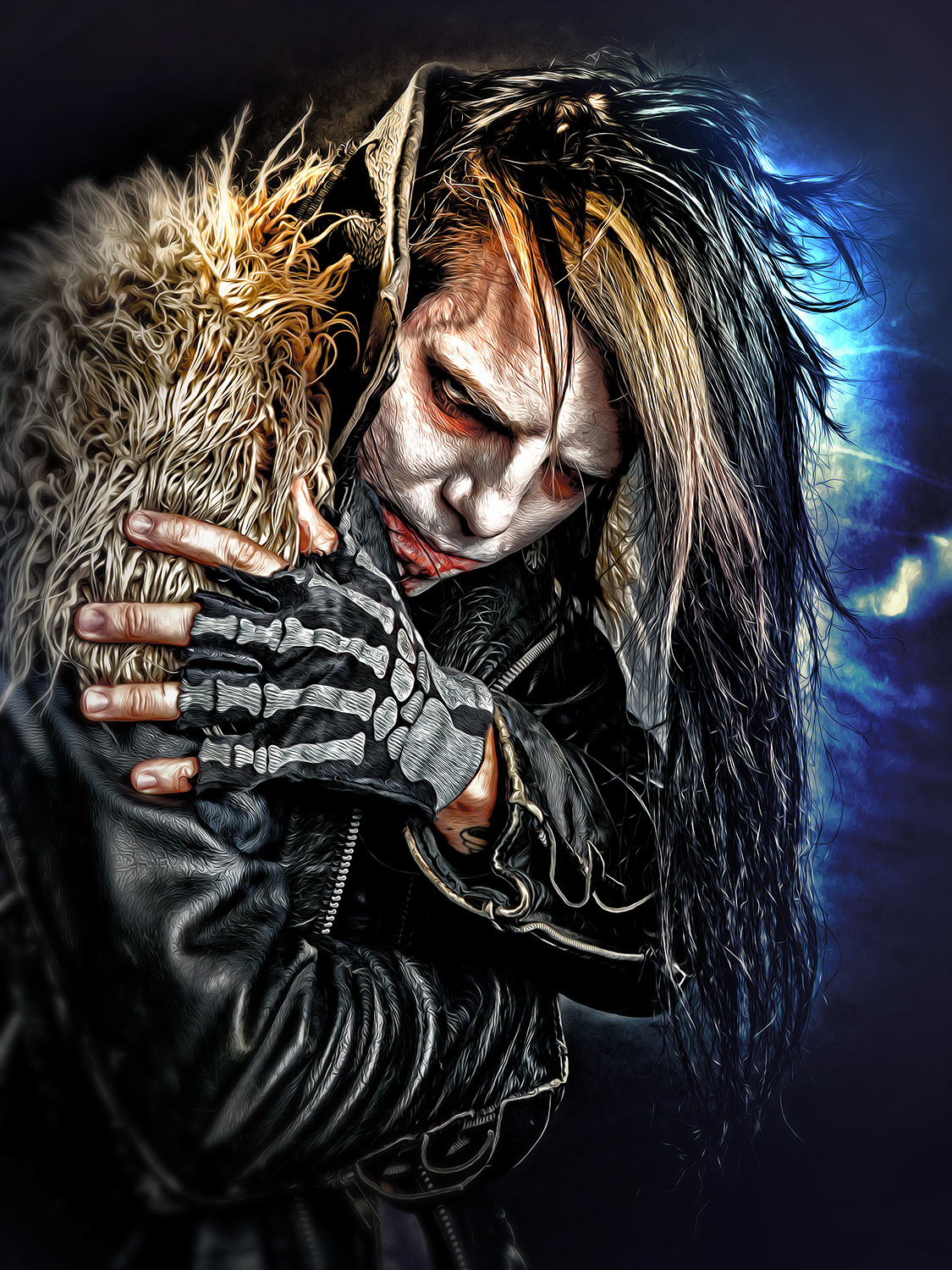
Portrait with skeleton gloves

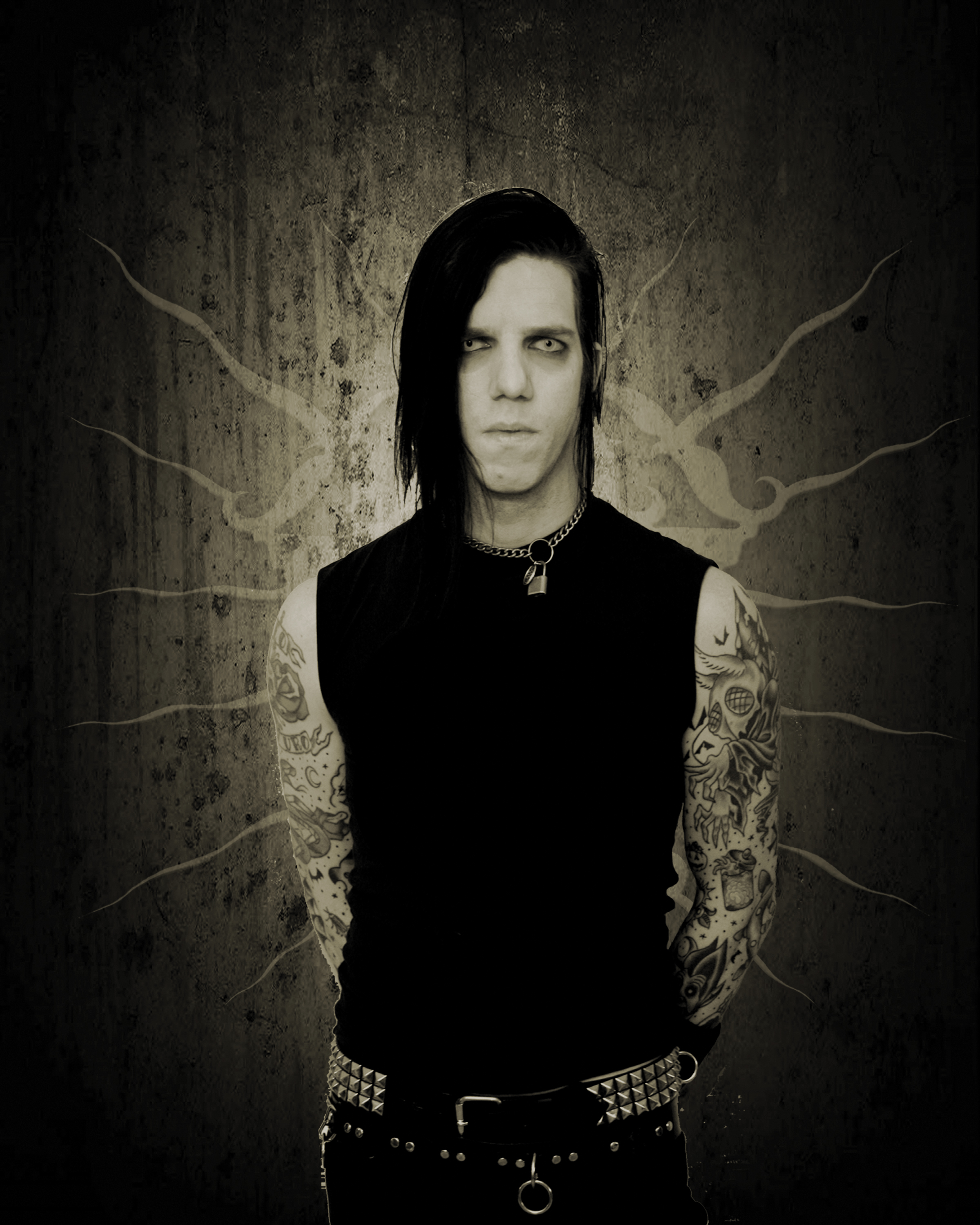
Portrait

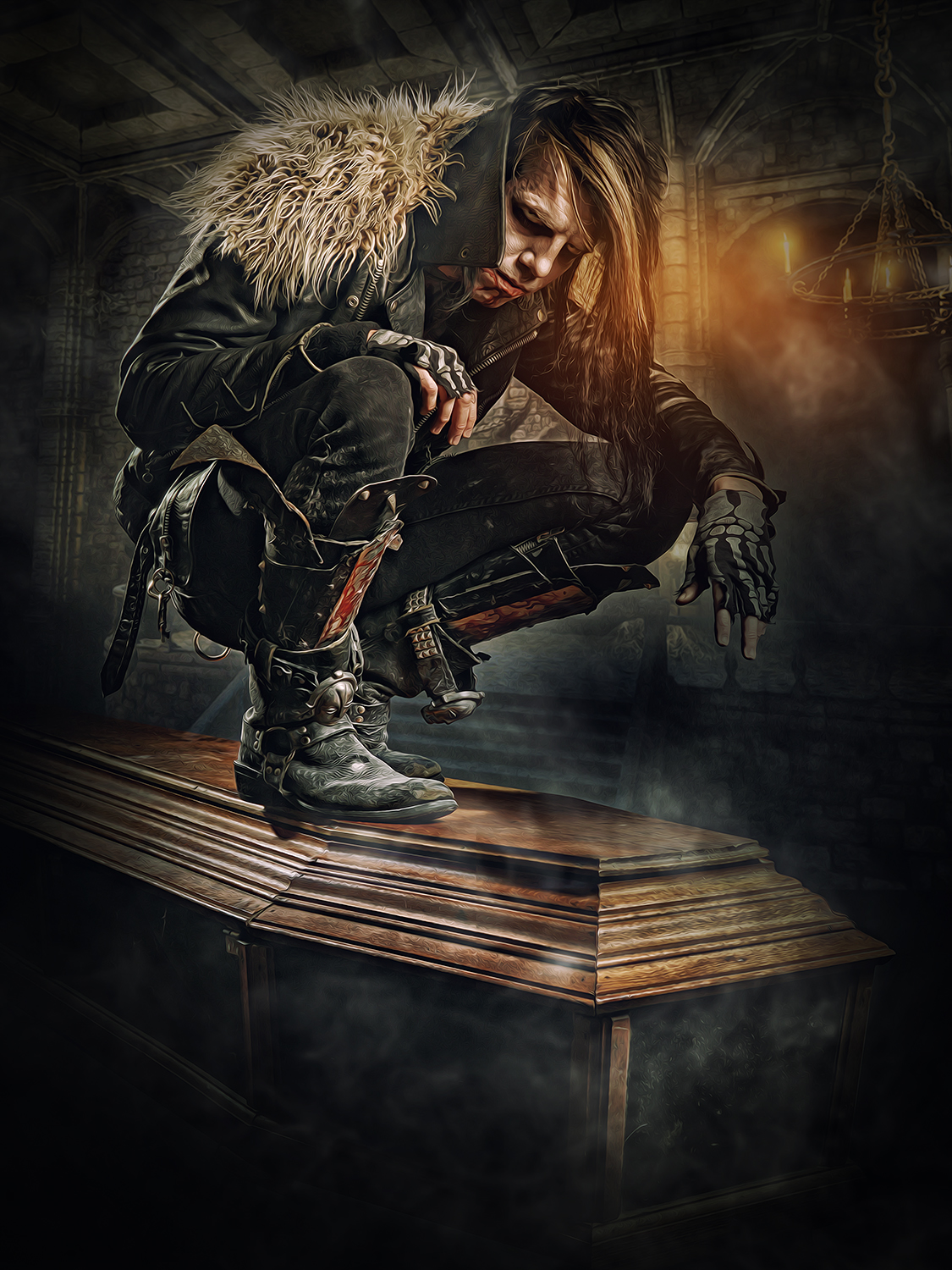
Portrait on coffin

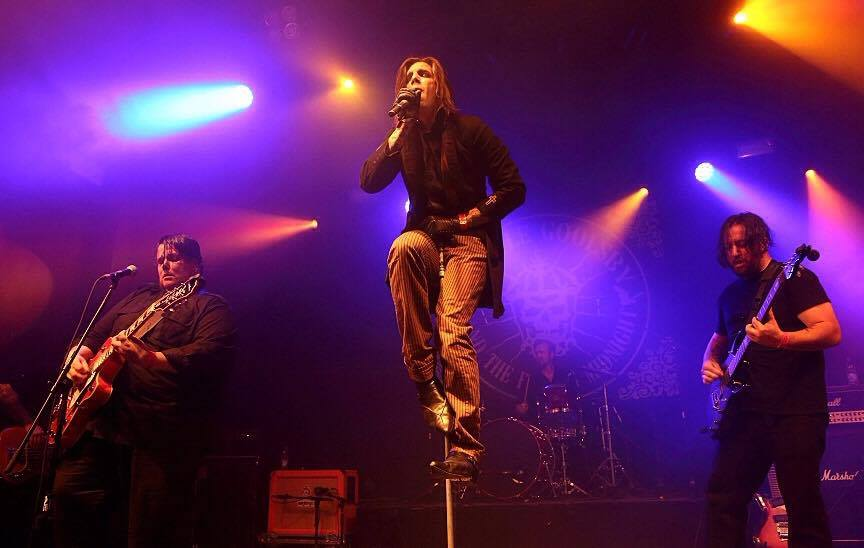
Performing in Leipzig, Germany (2016)

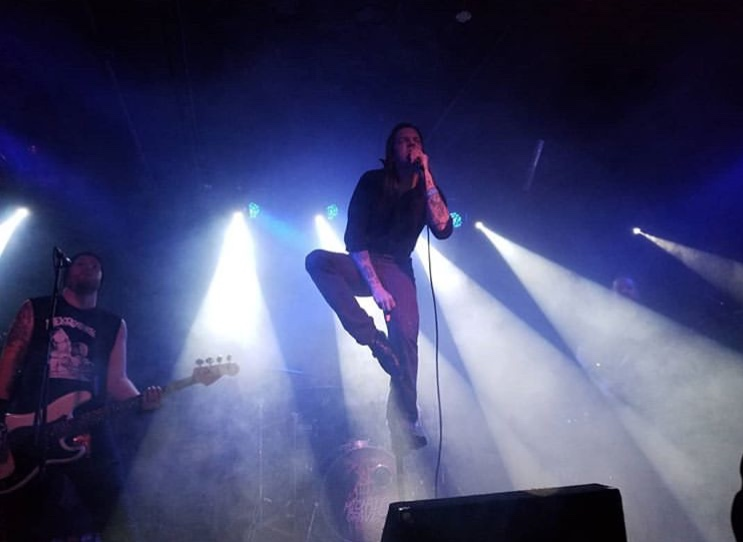
Performing at the Whisky a Go Go in Los Angeles (2018)
