= Brighton Bar =

Famous punk club in New Jersey

- Interactive map of Brighton Bar
- Location: Long Branch, New Jersey, U.S.
- Coordinates: 40°17′5″N 73°59′14.5″W
- Owner: Greg Macolino
- Type: Music venue
- Events: Punk; Hardcore

Construction
- Opened: 1996
- Closed: 2021
- Demolished: 2022

The Brighton Bar was a famous punk club located at 121 Brighton Avenue in Long Branch, New Jersey.

== History ==
Greg Macolino, a former Long Branch history teacher and former lead singer of hardcore band Chronic Sick, opened the Brighton Bar as a punk music venue in 1996. He was the sixth owner of the venue.

The Brighton Bar was often compared to CBGB. During the 1980s, it was the home of the New Jersey punk movement that primarily focused on Mutha Records. Later in the 1990s, it hosted performances by notable punk and hardcore bands, including U.S. Chaos, Chronic Sick, Stisisim, Mental Decay, Social Decay, Mental Abuse, Broken Heroes, Kraut, The Stun Gunz, Void Control, the Graveyard School, Speed Crazy, the Cryptkeeper Five, The Takers, and The Flair Up's, some who have shared the Brighton Bar's stage consistently for almost 30 years. In 2010, David Johansen of the New York Dolls and Andy Shernoff of The Dictators shared the stage. Jon Bon Jovi, the Damned, the Dictators, the Dickies, Fountains of Wayne, Gene Loves Jezebel, Jacko Monahan, Fear of Falling, Bruce Springsteen, Hubert Sumlin, Three Doors Down, and Bernie Worrell have also performed on the Brighton's stage. Although the Brighton closed during the COVID-19 pandemic, Macolino made sure shows went on for a while. “Even during the COVID thing, the Quiet Ones did a live broadcast with no audience from the Brighton and Metalland played outdoors in the driveway.”

The Brighton Bar closed in April 2021. It was torn down in November 2022.

== Legacy ==
Brighton Bar opened in 1915. It was one of the most recent incarnations of New Jersey's legendary punk venues, outliving the Dirt Club, the Pipeline in Newark, and Asbury Park's Fast Lane. The interior of the club features a mural, painted by Dave DeSantes, that pays tribute to all the legendary bands that have performed at the venue.

The club helped launch the careers of The Damned, Godspeed, Monster Magnet, Vice Squad, and The Misfits and has been called the "CBGBs of the South. Like CBGBs, the Brighton also showcased other forms of music over the years, including jazz, country, and blues. Macolino also supported the local comedy and art scenes and held many benefit events at the Brighton. The bar often had music nights featuring Monmouth University's radio station, WMCX.

== See also ==
List of New Jersey music venues by capacity
