= Web of Dharma =

Studio album by Graves
- Released: May 31, 2002
- Recorded: November 2–5, 2001
- Genre: Horror punk, pop punk
- Label: GDU Records
- Producer: Graves (Dr. Chud)

Web of Dharma is a 2002 album by American pop punk/horror punk band Graves, featuring ex-Misfits singer Michale Graves and drummer Dr. Chud.

== Demos and recording ==
Demos for Web of Dharma were recorded in November 2001. These recordings were produced by Ron Gouldie at June 3 Studios in Los Angeles.

The recording sessions for Web of Dharma occurred in April 2002 at Spin Studios in Long Island, New York. The album was produced by Dr. Chud and overdubbing sessions and final mixing took place in the "Creepy Attic", Dr. Chud's home studio.

A special limited edition of the album was sold at the record release party. The number of copies pressed is still unknown. Seemingly the only difference between the limited edition and the regular edition, is the artwork on the CD itself. Limited edition CD artwork contains the Grave Diggers Union logo. The album's artwork and band logo was designed by Dr. Chud and reproduced by James Rowe.

== Track listing ==
No.	Title	Length
1.	"One Million Light Years from Her"	2:33
2.	"So Don't You Know"	2:00
3.	"Blackbird"	1:52
4.	"Tell Me"	1:47
5.	"Ophelia"	3:37
6.	"Casket"	2:11
7.	"Attack of the Butterflies"	2:31
8.	"Shoestring"	3:33
9.	"Iridescent White Light"	3:09
Total length:		23:13

== Personnel ==
=== Music ===
- Michale Graves – vocals, guitar
- Tom Logan (Tom Hatziemanouel) – guitar
- Left Hand Graham – bass
- Dr. Chud – drums, keyboards, samples

=== Production ===
- Producer: Graves (Dr. Chud)
- Engineered and mixed by Dr. Chud, Nick Chinboukas and Teddy Stern
- Mastered by Alan Douches, Nick Chinboukas, Dr. Chud and Teddy Stern
