= Dr. Chud =

American drummer (born 1964)

- Also known as: The Abominable Dr. Chud
- Born: David Calabrese; April 4, 1964 (age 62); Lodi, New Jersey, U.S.
- Genres: Horror punk, heavy metal
- Occupations: Musician, songwriter, producer, actor
- Instruments: Drums, vocals, keyboards, guitar
- Years active: 1980–present
- Label: Bloodwork Records
- Member of: Dr. Chud's X-Ward, The Karens
- Formerly of: Misfits, Graves, Kryst the Conqueror, Gorgeous Frankenstein, Doyle, Blitzkid, Sacred Trash
- Website: www.drchud.com

David Calabrese (born April 4, 1964), known professionally as Dr. Chud, is an American horror punk drummer, songwriter, and producer, best known for his work with the Misfits during their 1995–2000 resurrection era. He has also been a member of Graves, Gorgeous Frankenstein, Doyle and Blitzkid, and fronts his own solo project Dr. Chud's X-Ward.

== Early life and education ==
David Calabrese was born on April 4, 1964, and raised in Lodi, New Jersey. He began playing drums in sixth grade and performed in local bands by eighth grade. During high school, he studied under Les DeMerle, Sonny Igoe, and Dennis DeLucia. He attended Lodi High School together with Doyle Wolfgang von Frankenstein, Eerie Von and Steve Zing, all graduating on the same day in 1982. As a teenager, he was a fan of Blondie, Aerosmith, Queen and Led Zeppelin.

In 1983, he joined Drum Corps International (DCI) as a member of the Bayonne Bridgemen, participating in the 1984 DCI Championships.

The stage name Dr. Chud is derived from the 1984 cult horror film C.H.U.D. In the film, the title is an acronym for Cannibalistic Humanoid Underground Dwellers. According to his official biography, Dr. Chud reinterpreted the acronym as Cannibalistic Humanoid Underground Drummer, adapting the phrase to reflect his role as a drummer and the dark humor commonly associated with the horror punk genre.

== Career ==
Dr. Chud began his musical career by playing with Dan Kidney and the Pulsations for seven years from 1987 to 1994. He recorded and produced a self-titled album with Sacred Trash before joining Doyle Wolfgang von Frankenstein and his brother Jerry Only in Kryst the Conqueror in 1992.

In 1995, Only and Doyle reformed the Misfits and recruited Chud and singer Michale Graves for the band. The lineup recorded the studio albums American Psycho and Famous Monsters, and the live album Evillive II, before Chud and Graves left the band in 2000. After leaving the Misfits, the pair formed the band Graves. The band released their debut album, Web of Dharma, in 2002, produced by Chud, before splitting up that same year.

In addition to his work with the Misfits and Graves, Chud played drums for Joey Ramone on the We Will Fall: A Tribute to Iggy Pop album and appeared on Ramone's solo record Don't Worry About Me, in addition to producing the Sardonica album Flip the Grill. In 2003, Chud formed a new band named Dr. Chud's X-Ward, which released their debut album Diagnosis for Death in 2004 on the drummer's own record label Bloodwork Records.

In 2008, Chud joined the horror punk band Blitzkid as a touring drummer, later that same year he joined Doyle Wolfgang von Frankenstein's band Gorgeous Frankenstein for their second tour. On 26 December 2009, Chud and former Misfits bandmates Doyle and Michale Graves took part in what was referred as the Misfits "Near-Reunion" in New Jersey as they performed as an opening act for Danzig, with bassist Argyle Goolsby completing the lineup.

In 2012, Gorgeous Frankenstein dissolved and Chud joined Doyle's new eponymous band. Doyle released their debut album, Abominator, in 2013. Chud departed from Doyle the following year.

In 2024, Chud produced the EP I Hate Horror Punk by the band The Karens and subsequently joined the group, he also produced the EP Manifesto by the hardcore band Chokepoint that same year.In 2025, he collaborated with Ada Nicole Sanger on the single "You're Always Right".

In August 2026, Chud and his band the X-Ward embarked on a tour of Italy and South America.

== Film and television ==
Dr. Chud has appeared in several independent films, including:

- Animal Room (1995)
- Big Money Hustlas (2000)
- Bruiser (2000)
- Campfire Stories (2001)

Between 1999 and 2000, he appeared as a wrestler for World Championship Wrestling (WCW), including episodes of WCW Monday Nitro, as part of a cross-promotion between the Misfits and the wrestling company.

In 2010, Chud appeared on the reality television series LA Ink, starring Kat Von D. During his appearance, he received a tattoo of the famous stitches that he usually draws on his chest and back, circling his neck, done by tattoo artist Amy Nicoletto.

Chud composed the soundtrack for the 2017, documentary 30 Years of Garbage: The Garbage Pail Kids Story.

== Discography ==
With Sardonica

- "Your Own Back Yard" (1992) – Single

With Sacred Trash

- Sacred Trash (1994) – LP

With Misfits

- American Psycho (1997) – LP
- "Dig Up Her Bones" (1997) – Single
- Evillive II (1998) – LP
- "Scream" (1999) – Single
- Famous Monsters (1999) – LP
- "Monster Mash" (1999) – Single
- Cuts from the Crypt (2001) – LP

With Graves

- Web of Dharma (2002) – LP

With Joey Ramone

- Don't Worry About Me (2002) – LP

With Dr. Chud's X-Ward

- Diagnosis for Death (2004) – LP

With Doyle

- Abominator (2013) – LP

With The Karens

- I Hate Horror Punk (2024) – EP
- I Wanna Refund (2025) – LP
