= Witch's Dungeon Classic Movie Museum =

Museum in Connecticut, USA

Coordinates: 41.6974°N 72.9700°W

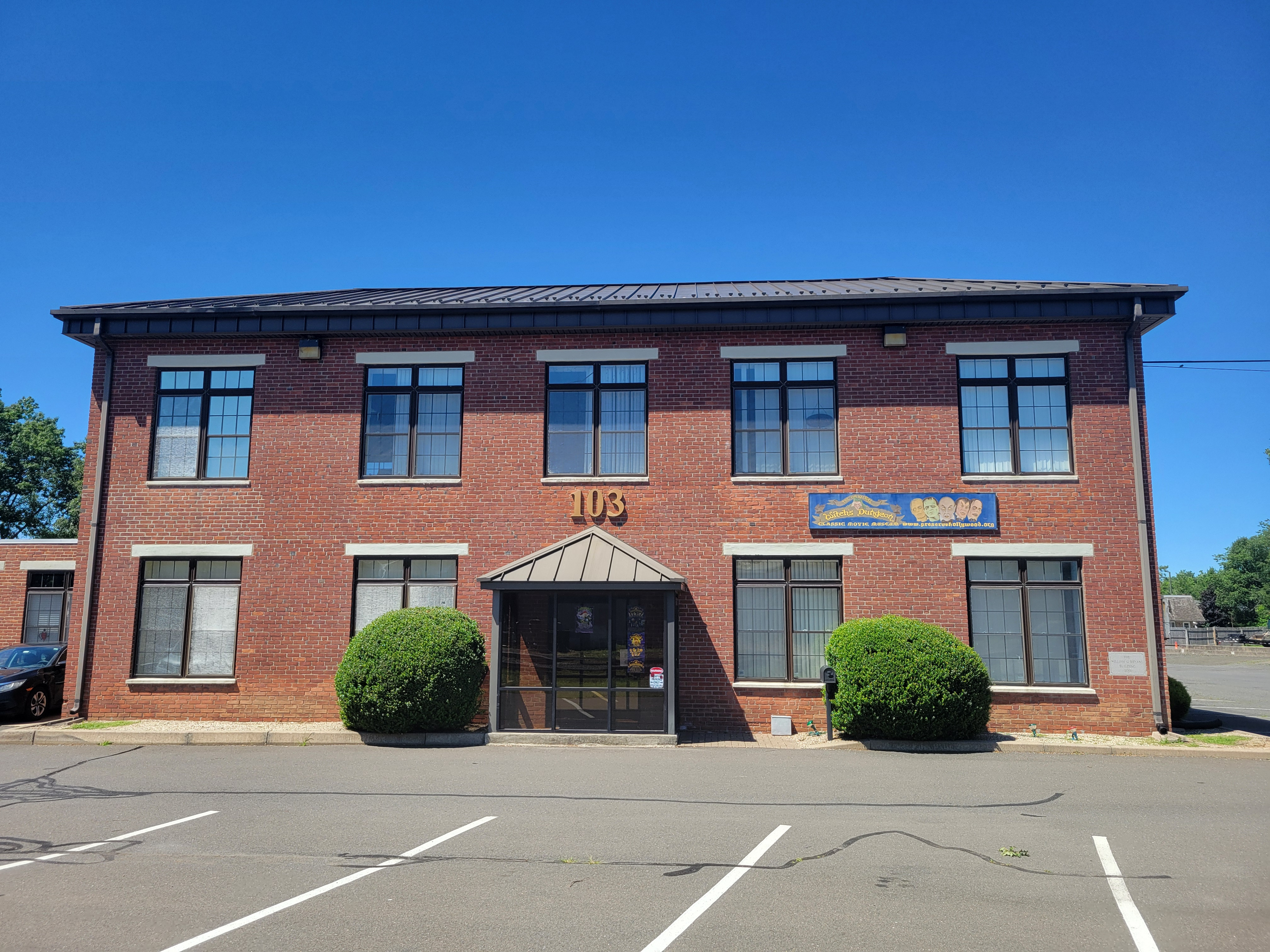
- Established: 1966
- Location: 103 East Main Street Plainville, CT 06062
- Type: Movie Memorabilia
- Curator: Cortlandt Hull
- Website: Witch's Dungeon Classic Movie Museum

The Witch's Dungeon Classic Movie Museum located in Plainville, Connecticut, USA, houses a collection of classic movie monster figures.

The museum is owned by Cortlandt Hull, a native of Bristol. He is the great-nephew of film actor Henry Hull. Josephine Hull, known for her role in the classic film and stage play Arsenic and Old Lace, is also a relative. In 1966, Corlandt's father assisted him in constructing the Swiss chalet-style building that now houses the museum. Initially, Corlandt crafted life-size figures of classic movie monsters using wax, fine wire mesh, papier-mâché, and polymers. These figures were later replaced with more accurate versions.

The museum is open year-round on weekend evenings. The museum relocated to 103 East Main Street, Plainville, CT 06062, where the expanded space allows each figure to have its own backdrop and props. Additionally, the museum features professional-level lighting designed by Emmy Award-winning Bill Diamond.

The heads of many of the figurines have been based on life-casts of the actual actors who portrayed them. Background sets and clothing are authentic to the era, with some costumes or props actually used in the original films. Characters represented in the museum are:

- Frankenstein's Monster (portrayed by Boris Karloff)
- Erik, The Phantom Of The Opera (portrayed by Lon Chaney Sr.)
- Zenobia, The Gypsy Witch (an original character voiced by June Foray)
- The Abominable Dr. Phibes (portrayed by Vincent Price)
- The Creature from the Black Lagoon (portrayed by Ricou Browning)
- Count Dracula (portrayed by Béla Lugosi)
- The Mole People
- Kharis, The Mummy (portrayed by Lon Chaney Jr.)
- Professor Henry Jarrod (scarred and unscarred versions), from House Of Wax (portrayed by Vincent Price) (one wears the original suit worn by Vincent Price in the film)
- The Fly (portrayed by David (Al) Hedison)
- Nosferatu, Count Orlok (portrayed by Max Schreck)
- The Masque of the Red Death, from The Phantom of the Opera (portrayed by Lon Chaney Sr.)
- Dr. Niemann (with Dracula's skeleton), from House of Frankenstein (portrayed by Boris Karloff)
- The Beast from La Belle et la Bête (portrayed by Jean Marais)
- Maleficent, from Disney's Sleeping Beauty
- Dr. Wilfred Glendon, The Werewolf of London (portrayed by Henry Hull)

== See also ==
- Universal Monsters
