= Diagnosis for Death =

Studio album by Dr. Chud's X-Ward
- Released: May 18, 2004
- Genre: Horror punk
- Label: Bloodwork Records
- Producer: Dr. Chud

Diagnosis for Death is the debut album by American horror punk band Dr. Chud's X-Ward, released in 2004 on Dr. Chud's Bloodwork Records label.

The first 1,000 copies of the album were limited edition and were signed, numbered and came with a free vinyl sticker. In 2005, it was released on purple vinyl; only 1,250 copies were released.

The video for the song "Powerless" was filmed in Zounds Rehearsal Studios in Saddebrook, New Jersey.

== Track listing ==
All lyrics are written by Dr. Chud; all music is composed by Dr. Chud, except track 1, co-written with Fish and Sal Bee.

No.	Title	Length
1.	"Powerless"	2:48
2.	"Mommy Made Luv 2 An Alien"	3:19
3.	"Heavy Metal"	2:44
4.	"Spiderbaby"	2:26
5.	"Blue Skin"	4:13
6.	"Goodbye"	6:40
7.	"Rabid"	2:26
8.	"Bury You Alive"	3:54

== Personnel ==
- Dr. Chud (David Calabrese) – vocals (all tracks), guitar (tracks 2, 4, 6, 8), drums (tracks 1, 3), keyboards (tracks 5–7), engineering, production, artwork
- Fish (Ken Fisher) – guitar (tracks 1, 2, 5–8)
- Mike Morance – guitar (track 4)
- Sal Verrico – guitar (track 3)
- Tom Logan (Tom Hatziemanouel) – guitar (track 3)
- Goolsby (Steve Matthews) – bass (tracks 2, 5, 8)
- Graham Van Der Veen – bass (tracks 3, 4)
- Sal Bee (Salvatore Bernice) – bass (track 1)
- X – bass (tracks 6, 7)
- Al X – drums (tracks 2, 5–8)
- Thommy Price – drums (track 4)
- Alan Douches – mastering
- Joe Simko – artwork
- Matt Lukish – artwork
