= Screams for Tina =

American death rock/gothic rock band

- Origin: Los Angeles, California
- Genres: Death rock, gothic rock
- Years active: 1985–1998, 2002–2003
- Labels: Strobelight Records
- Members: Warren Mansfield; Billy Budd
- Past members: Marvin Rinnig; Bobbi Drier; Kent Bancroft; Tom Wenzel; Loomis; Jett Black
- Website: screamsfortina.com

Screams for Tina was an American death rock and gothic rock band formed in Los Angeles in 1985 by Warren Mansfield (vocals, bass, keyboards) and Marvin Rinnig (guitar).

== History ==
The duo of Mansfield and Rinnig recorded a five-song 12-inch EP, Strobelight Funeral, released in 1986 on their own Dark Illusion Records label.

English bassist Billy Budd and local drummer Bobbi Drier joined in 1987, Then Billy Budd was replaced by Jett Black then the band became regular performers at LA clubs such as Scream, The Roxy and the Whisky a Go Go.

In 1988, L.A. Weekly held a citywide Rock Music Awards poll, and Screams for Tina placed in the Top 5 of the Best New Band and Best Underground Band categories, as well as in the Top 10 for Independent Album.

In 1990, Rinning was replaced by Kent Bancroft (Like Wreckage, Spahn Ranch). They released the double-7" EP Judgement Day in 1992 on Piece Of Mind Records.

Cleopatra Records included the band's song "11:11" on the 1993 compilation album The Whip. This led to the release of their eponymous first full-length studio album that year by Cleopatra in the US and Talitha Records in Germany.

In 1998, the group disbanded but it reformed in 2002 as a duo of Mansfield and Budd, and signed to Austrian label Strobelight Records, releasing the four-song EP 2003 A.D. the next year.

== Discography ==
=== Studio albums ===
- Screams for Tina (1993, Cleopatra Records/Talitha Records)

=== EPs ===
- Strobelight Funeral 12-inch (1986, Dark Illusion Records)
- Judgement Day 7-inch (1992, Piece of Mind Records)
- 2003 A.D. CD (2003, Strobelight Records)

=== Compilation appearances ===
- "11:11" on The Whip (1993, Cleopatra Records/Talitha Records)
