= Flesh Roxon =

Finnish horror punk band

- Origin: Tampere, Finland
- Genres: Psychobilly, horror punk action rock
- Years active: 2012–2021
- Labels: Live Nation Finland
- Members: Nicky Rothen; Thomas Killjoy / Tuomas Vuorio; Andy Reagan; Tommy The Mummy
- Past members: Ville "Mr. Willy" Mäkinen; Peter Gordell
- Website: fleshroxon.com

Flesh Roxon is a Finnish horror punk band, formed in 2012 in Tampere, Finland.

== History ==
The origins of the band lay in the meeting of double bass player Ville Mäkinen (future "Mr. Willy"), native of Tampere, and two punk rock musicians, Nicky Rothen and Petri Torkell (future "Peter Cordell"), from the Northern Finnish town of Kemi in 2010 in Tampere. The decision to form a psychobilly band had been taken by the next year, and therefore Flesh Roxon had been formed by January 2012. During the first year of their existence, Flesh Roxon refined their act at live shows as well as in the studio. The band also performed at the 2012 Cosmic Puffin Festival on Mersea Island.

The band's name had been chosen by vocalist and guitar player Nicky Rothen.

In 2014, Flesh Roxon left Live Nation and signed a new deal with Finnish Stupido Records. The band's second long play Darker Side of Life was recorded in January 2015 at Studio Vire in Tampere with The Brains singer-guitarist Rene D La Muerte, who also co-produced the album with Flesh Roxon. In February 2015, the new single was released on the digital single God Sent Me to Hell, which was solo guided by Andy McCoy, who toured three tracks on the album.

Peter Cordell (Petri Torkell) left the band in 2015. Antero Malinen from Hyvinkää was chosen as the drummer. Peter Cordell rejoined the band in 2016, when Malinen left the band's drummer's ball. Cordell played in the ranks of Flesh Roxon until 2019, when he left the drummer washed. Tuomas Vuorio (Thomas Roxon) from Turku was chosen as the new drummer. Vuorio is a well-known face in Finnish drum circles and has gained fame among the Death Metal band in Mysore.

Flesh Roxon signed a record deal with German Blood Rite Records & Dark Wings in 2020 and released a new third studio album in October 2021.

In November 2021, Nicky Rothen announced the end of her career at Flesh Roxon and said she was moving on to a solo career. Other members said they would continue to operate under the new name ROXON A.D. who released their debut single "Rest In Pain" on 24 December 2021. ROXON A.D. debut single named "Rest In Pain"

== Style ==
Flesh Roxon's style combines psychobilly, metal and the tradition of horror punk, using morbid or violent imagery and lyrics influenced by horror films or science fiction B-movies. They had described their style as "zombie rock" and have professed their admiration for B-movies and George A. Romero's work. The video "Back From Your Grave" from their album Flesh to the Bone is inspired by the black and white horror films of the 1920–1940 period.

In early October 2013, the latest version of the iOS and Android arcade game Zombie Road Trip by Noodlecake Studios featured a special Flesh Roxon bundle, consisting of a branded vehicle and chainsaw launcher gun and the songs "Lonely Rider" and "Suck My Chainsaw" from the debut album Flesh to the Bone. The update has been also advertised on the band's Facebook page and is available for free.

On 1 November 2013, there was also released the Android arcade game Flesh Roxon's Zombie Rock in which the three band members appear as enemy zombie characters with songs from the "Flesh To The Bone" album playing as background music.

== Members ==
- Nicky Rothen – vocals, guitar (2012–)
- Andy Reagan – guitar, background vocals (2019–)
- Tommy The Mummy – double bass (2019–)
- Tuomas "Thomas Killjoy" Vuorio – drums (2019–)

Former members

- Ville "Mr. Willy" Mäkinen – double bass (2012–2014)
- Peter Cordell Drums 2012-2019

== Discography ==
The debut album of the band, Flesh to the Bone, was released on 2 January 2013, in Finland and has been released on iTunes and other digital stores worldwide on 1 March 2013. The album got a very favorable review from Fearnet for their fast and muscular punk attitude, melodic purity and vocal harmonies. The video for the Lonely Rider song also got favorable reviews as a modern interpretation of the theme and style of B-grade horror films.

=== Track list ===
No.	Title	Length
1.	"Running Away"	2:39
2.	"Back From Your Grave"	3:29
3.	"Angel"	4:31
4.	"Lonely Rider"	3:09
5.	"Don't You Dare"	2:49
6.	"Suck My Chainsaw"	2:52
7.	"Treehouse of Horror"	2:57
8.	"Hate You"	2:48
9.	"Zombie"	4:01
10.	"Flesh To the Bone"	3:10
11.	"Born To Lose"	3:51

== See also ==
- Rock music in Finland
