= Serpenteens =

American horror punk band

- Serpenteens live at an acoustic set at Dragon*Con 2007

Background information
- Origin: (United States) New York, New York, USA
- Genres: Psychobilly, Horror punk
- Years active: 1995–present
- Labels: Blood and Guts Records
- Members: DJ Gee Grant, Mark Zap, Frank Morin, Glenn Sorino
- Website: www.serpenteens.com

The Serpenteens (or Serpenteens) is an American horror punk band based in New York City. The group was formed in late 1995 by Gee Grant and Mark Zap.

== History ==
Combining a passion for horror and zombie movies, with the love of theatrical bands (KISS, The Misfits, Alice Cooper, etc.), they began to lay the foundation for a concept. The look of the classic film "zombie" combined with a catchy "monsterpop" sound was to become a signature trademark. The band's first and second demos (titled "DM" and "VoodooZombieSex Dolls") became underground tape trading favorites worldwide, and eventually sold almost 1,000 copies as a compilation through MP3.com as the band played shows and made friends all along the east coast.

In 2003, the band's present lineup was rounded out by seasoned recording/touring veterans Frank Morin (Frank N. Stein) and Glenn Sorino (The Oddz) and the band began to work on its first new material in years. In 2005 the band began recording tracks in their own 48-track studio "PlanetGrey" in NYC's East Village. Between them, Mark and Gee hold certificates in audio engineering, live sound and location recording. They also produce all the band's material. In 2006, Serpenteens released a new CD titled "Dead Men Walking" – which contained news songs and professional re-recordings of now-classic "monsterpop" material. The band officially signed with Washington State's infamous Blood And Guts Records and are distributed by Cargo Distribution

Later in 2006, the band set out on a successful 3-week mini tour that covered most of the East Coast and Midwest of the US. They continue to play shows on the east coast regularly, and will tour Europe in 2008. In 2007 the band debuted its second Blood And Guts Records release "The Superhuman Monstershow", (the next level of evilution for these NYC horror rockers) and will be touring the U.S. extensively. The band is currently fully endorsed by Hartke Amplification, Coffin Case and Samson Electronics.

The Serpenteens were the Northeast Semi-Finalists of the Discmakers Indie Music world series.

They play the Fangoria Radio Theme (Siruis Radio 102) Featuring hosts Dee Snider (Twisted Sister) and horror Actress Debbie Rachon. The theme is played every week and is the official website's theme music. In addition, the band has had 3 appearances/performances on Fangoria Radio (Sirius 102) National, live broadcast.

They were also featured at 2007's Dragon*Con in Atlanta, GA.

== Reviews (2006–2007) ==
- Lollipop Magazine
- NUVO - Indianapolis City Paper
- Innocent Words Magazine
- The Nerve Magazine

== Feature articles (2006 - 2007 ) ==
- Pittsburgh City Paper: "Serpenteens terrorize a whole new generation with Dead Men Walking"
- Red Scream Magazine Horror Special Issue - (print only)

== Members ==
- Alphamayle (DJ Gee Grant) - Vocals
- Mark "Bub" Zap (Mark Zap) - Bass
- Frank N. Stein (Frank Morin) - Guitars
- Glenn "The Creature" Sorino - Drums

== Discography ==
- "Bullet. Return Of The Fly: Here Come The Dead. A Tribute To The Misfits 2" (1998)
- "Dead Men Walking/Assuming Control Of The Planet Earth" (1998)
- "X-Ray Eyes: Grave Rockers Horror Rock Compilation" (2000)
- "Dead Men Walking" (2006)
- "The Superhuman Monstershow" (2007)
- "Make Sure That I'm Dead. Trash Pit Volume 1: New Breed Rising" (2007)
