= Blitzkid =

American horror punk band

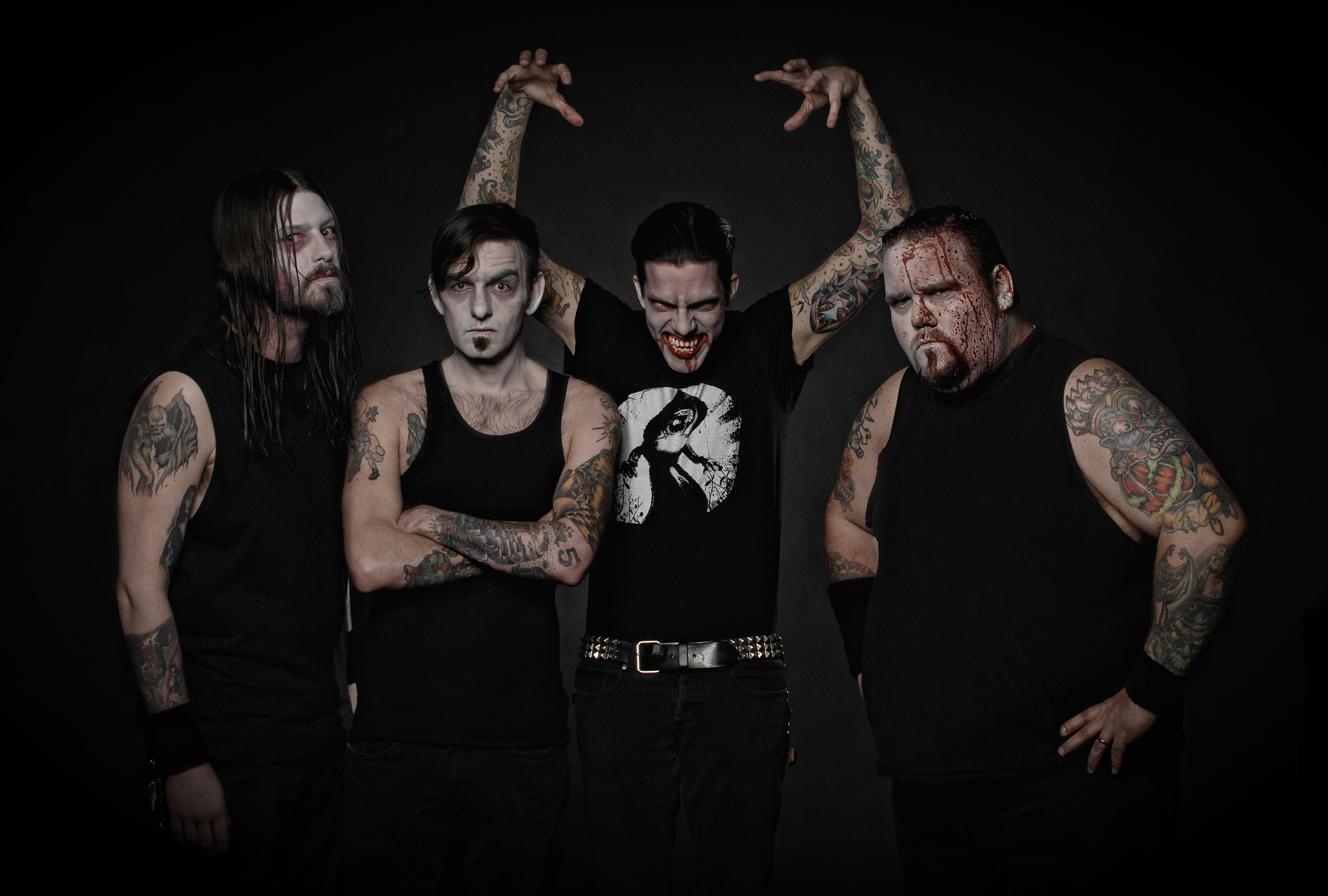
- Blitzkid in 2012

Background information
- Origin: Bluefield, West Virginia, U.S.
- Genres: Horror punk; punk rock
- Years active: 1997–2012, 2019–present
- Labels: EMI; Century Media; Antidote; Fiendforce; People Like You
- Members: Argyle Goolsby; TB Monstrosity; Ryan Manning
- Past members: Ricko Mortis; Del Shannon; JV Bastard; Jason "J~Sin" Trioxin; Billy Bones; Dr. Stuart Evilstein; Rhea M Andrew "Stripes" Winter; Paul Lifeless; Nathan Bane; Dr. Chud; Verden Gravstead; Gilby Deviant
- Website: blitzkid.com

Blitzkid is an American horror punk band from Bluefield, West Virginia. One of the leading proponents of the horror punk scene, the band is led by singer/guitarist TB Monstrosity and singer/bassist Argyle Goolsby. Active from 1997 until 2012 and reforming in 2020, Blitzkid released five studio albums, appeared on numerous compilations, and toured both nationally and internationally.

== History ==
Goolsby, who credits his late mother for giving him the "dedication" to be successful in music, and Monstrosity, who admits to having had the ambition to make Blitzkid a "huge" band, began playing as Blitzkid in early 1997. Initially the duo were motivated by escaping boredom and creating a soundtrack for skating, but over time developed an interest in expressing thoughts about "universal understanding of the world and yourself and your place in it" by embedding metaphors within the dark imagery of their lyrics.

Artist, children's author, and film maker Gris Grimly approached Blitzkid to compose the title track to his 2006 film Cannibal Flesh Riot. The band did this, and also received Grimly artwork to use for a Blitzkid T-shirt design.

Blitzkid played 260 live dates in 2006. In August 2007, the band played the heavy metal-oriented Summer Breeze Open Air festival in Germany in front of 40,000 concert goers. Another notable live gig the band played that summer was supporting The Damned in Prague. The Damned are an important influence to the band and to horror punk generally, and are one of the original UK punk bands.

Blitzkid were back in Germany one year later, this time taking the main stage at the gothic rock themed M'era Luna Festival, playing before an audience of between 20,000 and 25,000.

In July 2010, during their tenth tour of Europe, Blitzkid were one of 34 bands to play the alternative rock Amphi Festival in Cologne, for as many as 50,000 attendees.

In 2011, Blitzkid were third on the bill of a North American tour with Face to Face, Strung Out, and the Darlings. This tour helped raise the band's profile in the wider punk community. A reviewer for the Dallas Observer found the band's "speedy pop-punk with a tinge of metal and classic Misfits" to be "worthy" and "polished", while a reviewer of the Houston show opined that Blitzkid's fusion of "horror punk, '50s rock, and hardcore elements... kicked quite a bit of ass". On the other hand, the advance coverage of the event in Nashville Scene, while praising the two headliners, dismissed Blitzkid as "gothy-looking mall rockers". Following this tour Blitzkid again played Germany's Summer Breeze Open Air festival in August 2011.

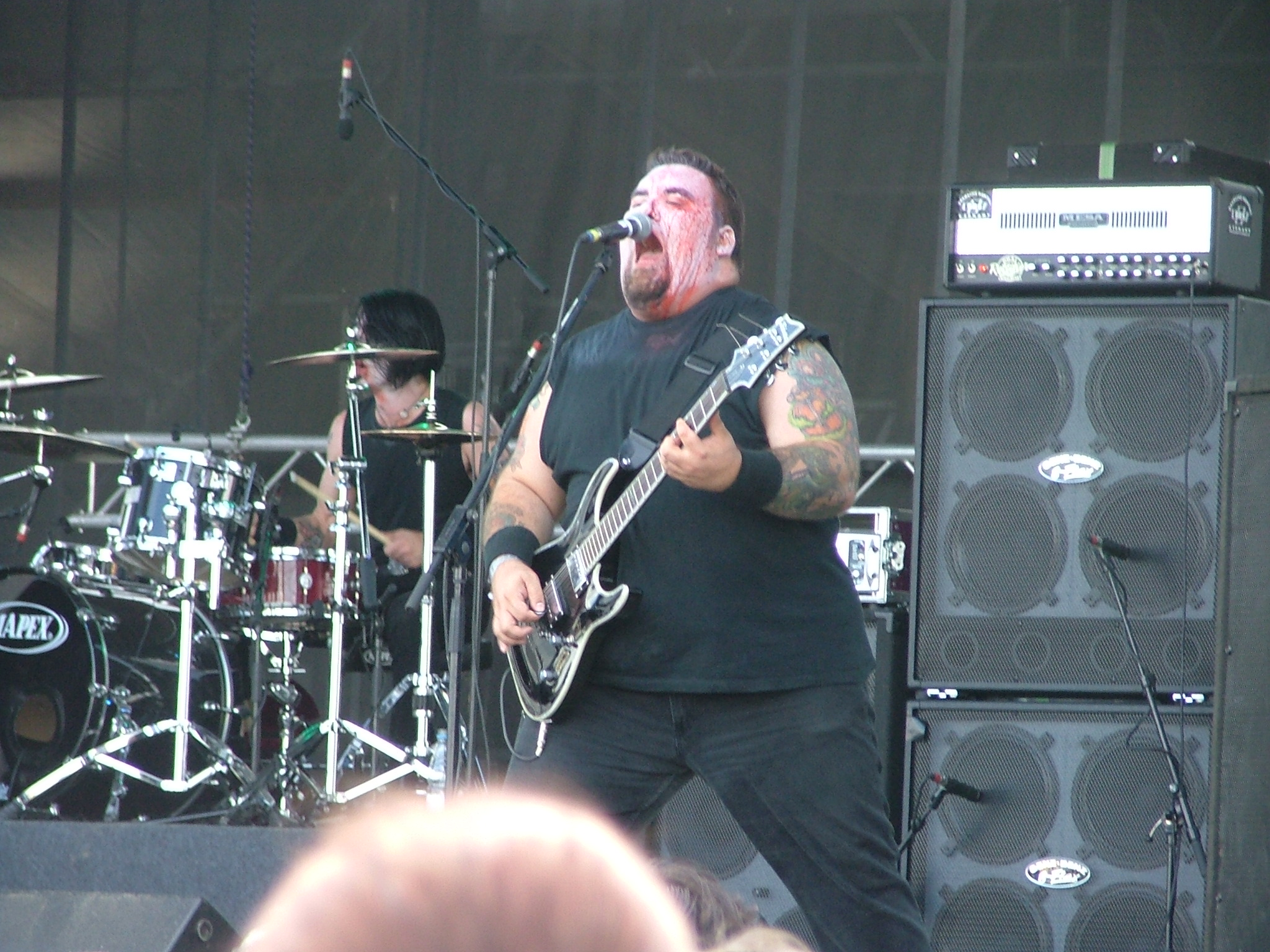
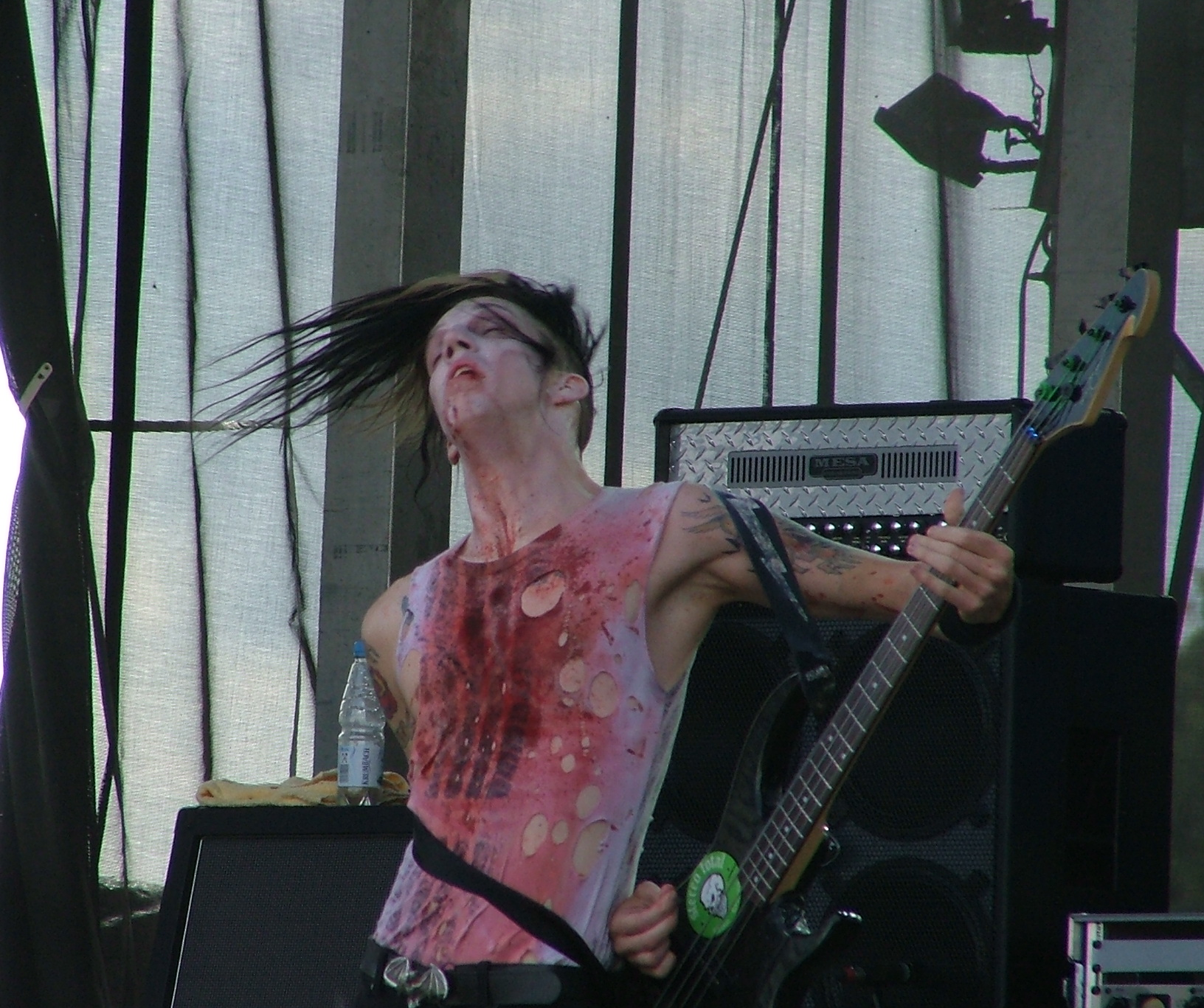
Blitzkid at Summer Breeze Open Air 2007

During Blitzkid's final European tour in 2012, which also included 14 dates in Germany, seven in the UK, three in the Czech Republic, and two in Slovakia, the band played in Russia for the first time, headlining a one-hour 45 minute show at Moscow's Relax Club. The UK dates included second billing (out of five bands) to Alien Sex Fiend at the November 3 lineup of the Whitby Goth Weekend.

Citing changing family commitments, Monstrosity announced his intention to leave Blitzkid in 2011, but remain in his side-band, Vagora, which had a less demanding tour schedule. Blitzkid officially broke up by the end of 2012, with Argyle Goolsby embarking on a solo career. As of July 2014, Goolsby and Monstrosity's current musical projects are the bands Argyle Goolsby and the Roving Midnight and A Gathering of None respectively.

A documentary of Blitzkid's history titled Blitzkid: Return to the Living, directed by Jeff Frumess of Video Business Media, was announced along with a Indiegogo campaign to help fund the project in 2017, but was shelved due to undisclosed reasons. The fate of the long awaited picture remains a mystery.

After having reunited for two nights to appear at the Jason Trioxin tribute shows in Teaneck NJ in June 2019, the band announced a reunion tour in spring 2020 called the Escape the Grave tour, which later postponed to 2022 due to the COVID-19 pandemic.

=== Notable collaborations ===
Blitzkid has a connection with the original and, by many accounts, leading horror punk progenitors, the Misfits. In 2007, Goolsby played bass and performed vocal duties for Gorgeous Frankenstein, a project headed by ex-Misfits guitarist Doyle Wolfgang von Frankenstein. He played with Doyle's band while remaining in Blitzkid, making him one of horror punk's more visible figures. Doyle returned the favor by guesting on "Mr. Sardonicus" on Blitzkid's Apparitional album. Doyle is one of two ex-Misfits to have collaborated with Blitzkid; Dr. Chud has played drums for Blitzkid at several gigs including the M'era Luna Festival. Chud's playing with Blitzkid can be heard on both the rare Hell Nights Tour 7″ picture disk and on the Anatomy of Reanimation LP. In 2002, Goolsby also played bass for The Undead, the notable horror punk band featuring ex-Misfit Bobby Steele.

== Musical style ==
Blitzkid's melodic approach to the horror punk genre was noted for its strong vocals; Allmusic has described Monstrosity and Goolsby's singing as "immediately appealing". Not all critics were enamored with their music however; the reviewer for Apoch's Metal Review expressed an unfavorable view of some of the band's non-vocal instrumentation. A third reviewer, in a favorable appraisal, expressed the opinion that lyrical concerns aside, Apparitional-era Blitzkid was not sonically dissimilar to such notable punk rock peers as Bouncing Souls, NOFX, and AFI.

== Impact ==
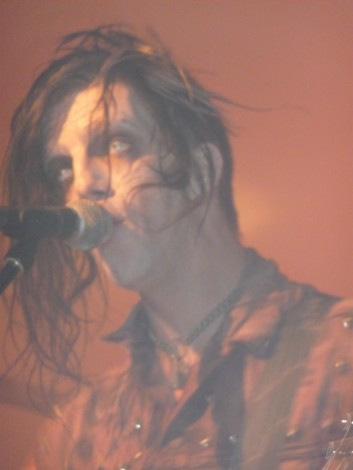
Argyle Goolsby performing with Blitzkid in Germany (2009)

Writing about the band's then-forthcoming retirement, Zachary Ehren of the Huffington Post remarked that "the legend of their music will continue to live on through their dedicated fanbase and the continuous terror they bring to mothers as their children listen to them across the globe." Another reviewer had a more modest assessment of the band's impact; while conceding Blitzkid had been "in the Horror Punk spotlight ... for quite some time", it was suggested that that particular spotlight does not shine particularly brightly due to the band's "underground tactics".

Matt Pathetic, organizer of an annual horror punk festival in New Jersey, reflected on his perspective of the band initially pestering him to be included in the 2001 lineup, only to later become a perennial headliner until their retirement: "Ten years ago a lot of people used to say Blitzkid sounds like the new Misfits. Well, being involved in this scene for a decade, I can say nowadays there's a lot of bands that sound like Blitzkid." Blitzkid is often praised as having left a significant mark on the horror punk scene while Argyle Goolsby, speaking after a show in the UK, takes a more humble approach to his work: "I don't have these unreal expectations that we have to have been this ground-breaking blueprint band, I'm not looking for that. I'm just looking for someone to play our CD like ten years from now. When they have a good day. Or a bad day."

== Band members ==
Timeline

== Discography ==
=== Albums ===
Year	Title	Label	Format	Other information
2000	Terrifying Tales	Independent	CDr	
2001	Let Flowers Die	Antidote Records	LP/CD	First full-length album, preceded by two EPs.
2003	Trace of a Stranger	Antidote Records	LP/CD	
2006	Five Cellars Below	Fiendforce Records	LP/CD	
2008	Anatomy of Reanimation Vol 1	Fiendforce Records	LP/CD	This album features re-recorded versions of songs from Blitzkid's then-back catalog.
2011	Apparitional	Century Media, EMI	LP/CD	Only BK album to feature Goolsby lead vocals on all tracks and Nathan Bane as main guitarist. Features guest guitar appearance by Doyle Wolfgang von Frankenstein on "Mr. Sardonicus".
2026	Modern Hel	ACWNN Productions(US)/Ring of Fire Records(International)	LP/CD	First Blitzkid LP to feature Ryan Manning on drums

=== Demos ===
- 1997: Songs for the Aesthetically Challenged (re-release in 2010, only downloadable)

=== EPs ===
- 1999: Terrifying Tales (re-released in 2012 on EMI Germany)
- 1999: Revisited
- 2003: Exhuming Graves and Making Dates (split 10-inch LP with Mister Monster)
- 2006: Everyday Is Halloween (split 7-inch LP with The Spook)
- 2007: Split Personalities (split 7-inch LP with The Cryptkeeper Five)
- 2008: Hell Night's Tour 7-inch picture disc (only 66 copies pressed; features Dr. Chud on drums)
- 2010: Fistfull of Balls Volume 1 (split with Nim Vind)
- 2011: Head over Hills (7-inch LP)
- 2021: Ad Nauseam Memoriae
- 2024: Lycanthro-ep

=== Misc. releases ===
- 2004: Hollow Bodies (acoustic live album)
- 2009: Studio Dead (live album, only downloadable)
- 2009: Revisited (new edition, only downloadable)
- 2009: Rarities (rarities album, only downloadable)
- 2021: All Hallow’s Stre’em (live album, 2020 Halloween Live Stream)
- 2022: All Hallow’s Stre’em 2 (live album, 2021 Halloween Live Stream)
- 2024: Rarities 2 (rarities album, only downloadable)

=== Compilations ===
- 2003: This Is Horror Punk (song: "Lupen Tooth")
- 2006: Horror High presents: Prom Queen Massacre (song: "Pretty in a Casket")
- 2006: Fiendforce Cuts Vol 1 (song: "Terror (in the haunted house)" and "Dementia")
- 2006: Ox-Compilation # 67 (song: "Terror (in the haunted house)")
- 2006: Sonic Seducer – Cold Hands Seduction Vol 62 (song: "Mary and the Storm")
- 2006: Zillo Scope Signs & Sounds New 2006/09 (song: "Carve out a Heart")
- 2006: Cannibal Flesh Riot (song: "Cannibal Flesh Riot")
- 2007: It Came from Trafalgar Soundtrack Volume # 1 (song: "Demon Machine")
- 2007: Paid in Black: A Tribute to Johnny Cash (song: "I Walk the Line")
- 2008: Get acquainted Vol 1 (song: "I'm a Zombie," "Hate you better" and "Ad Nauseum Memorie (live)")
- 2010: The Sound of Horror – Volume 1 (song: "Love Like Blood")
- 2011: Ox-Compilation # 95 (song: "She won't stop bleeding")
- 2011: XtraX Clubtrax Vol 3 (song: "Jane Doe # 9")
- 2023: Goo Goo Muck - A Tribute to The Cramps (song: “Garbageman”)
