= Dr. Chud's X-Ward =

American horror punk band

- Origin: Lodi, New Jersey, U.S.
- Genres: Horror punk, heavy metal
- Years active: 2003–present
- Label: Bloodwork
- Members: Dr. Chud; The Murp; Sal Bee; MDFE
- Past members: MDFE; Dr. Goolsby; Rebeckah Nurse; Fish; Robby Bloodshed; John Glancy; Chad Springfield; Dr. Placebo; Thommy Price; Mark Danger

Dr. Chud's X-Ward is an American horror punk band, formed in 2003 after Dr. Chud folded his other band Graves. Their first album, Diagnosis for Death, was released in 2004 on Dr. Chud's own Bloodwork Records label. The first 1,000 copies of the album were limited edition and were signed, numbered and came with a free vinyl sticker. In 2005, it was released on purple vinyl. Only 1,250 copies were released. Every Halloween, the band goes on tour.

== Members ==
=== Current line-up as of October 2019 ===
- Dr. Chud – vocals
- The Fish – guitar
- Al X – drums
- Sal Bee – bass

=== Past tour members ===
- Dr. Placebo – drums
- The Murp – drums
- Robby Bloodshed – guitar
- Argyle Goolsby – bass
- Sal Bee – bass
- Mark Danger – bass
- Rebeckah Nurse – guitar
- Fish – guitar
- Voodoo Quiz – guitar
- MDFE – guitar
- Alx – drums
- Matt Bergman – bass
- John Glancy – guitar
- Chad Wells – drums
- Nurse Knollwood – guitar

== Discography ==
- Diagnosis for Death (2004)
