= The Cryptkeeper Five =

American rock band

- Origin: Trenton, New Jersey, United States
- Genres: Rock and roll, punk rock, horror punk
- Years active: 1997–present
- Labels: Peephole; Bony Orbit Records; The Black Sneer; Pure White Music; No Balls Records; Say-10 Records
- Members: Johnny Ott; Jimmy Ray; Mikey Groch; Brian Mazzarini; Buzzy; Sean Glonek
- Past members: D. T. Graves; Nicky Arabatzis; Ceilidh Madigan; Amy Matlack; Scotty Engel; Jack Arnone; J. West; Tristan Bowan; Joey Waladkewics; Frankie Danger; Ed Pratico; Steven Furyk; Mike Herbert; Petey Vul; Matt Noonan; Rob Hunsicker; Andrew Chupik; Mark Pisarchik (temp)
- Website: www.cryptkeeperfive.com

The Cryptkeeper Five (sometimes referred to as CK5) are an American punk rock/rock and roll band formed in 1997 in Trenton, New Jersey.

== History ==
Vocalist Johnny Ott, guitarist Jimmy Ray, and drummer D.T. Graves (on and off) have been in CK5 since its 1997 origin, with many different supporting players over the years. The trio previously played together in a band called Navalistic Death. Ott's first CK5-leaning lyrics were for a song called "Black Death A Go-Go." At the outset, the group were a "straight ahead punk rock band", according to D.T. Their first album, Dear Dr. X... I Wanna be the Creature (1997), not only reflects this musical direction, but also was characterized lyrically by a preoccupation with "B-movies." Although they have evolved, they have retained a "raw" and unpremeditated approach to music, letting the music flow organically. This attitude is not, again according to D.T., to be confused with being content with "sounding like shit".

The band's name appears to be a blended reference to the fictional "crypt-kicker five" from the song "Monster Mash", and the host of EC Comics's Tales From the Crypt. However, Ott has stated that this was only a subconscious influence, and that the name was instead a horror rock update of the pop/rock "Fives", such as Dave Clark Five and Jackson Five. Unlike those groups, CK5's name does not refer to the number of band members, which has fluctuated between three and seven. The current lineup includes Johnny Ott (vocals/guitar), Jimmy Ray (guitar/vocals), D.T. Graves (drums/vocals), Mikey G (bass guitar/vocals), and Brian Mazzarini (drums).

CK5 have toured extensively along the US east coast and midwest since their formation. They toured Europe and the UK in 2016, and continue to play frequent dates, internationally, to this day.

The band's music was used in the 2007 movie Welcome to Dreadville II: Red in Dreadville, written by Jason Patfield and directed by Michael Schmid and John Bienasz.

On December 13, 2014, CK5 played a benefit at the Brighton Bar for that legendary club's longtime booker Jacko Monahan, who was battling necrotizing fasctitis.

== Influences and musical style ==
In addition to The Ramones and The Misfits, the band counts Bruce Springsteen, Roy Orbison, and Tom Petty among its influences.

While other punk rock and horror punk bands have produced a blend of 1950s rock and Ramones/Misfits-inspired punk, CK5 are unique for introducing a sax-including Jersey rock element to that mix. Regarding this mix of influences, a writer for Punk Globe magazine, in reviewing Rise of the Palace Depression/Darker Days, suggested that a comparison to the E Street Band is valid, and that CK5's Doo wop usage is in a more similar vein to Frank Zappa than to Frankie Valli. In a 2002 interview, drummer D. T. Graves said of the music which inspires them: "All the great genres of rock- 50's rock, the girl groups of the 60's, the 70's punk, Jersey shore rock... all tend to rely on the same qualities. They tap into something that makes your heart skip a beat or two, the magical quality."

Their sound has inspired some colorful descriptions. Music journalist-author Gary Wien, who wrote that CK5's music is "most likely like nothing you would expect", described them as: "Roy Orbison singing lead for the Ramones covering John Cafferty & The Beaver Brown Band". Other commenters have come up with "Elvis does the Monster Mash", and "Jerry Lee Lewis (singing) for the Misfits"; a reviewer for punk fanzine Razorcake chose a somewhat more contemporary reference, writing "imagine Danzig fronting Rocket from the Crypt".

== Media coverage ==
Gary Wien, a New Jersey music journalist who specializes in writing about the music of his home state, included the Cryptkeeper Five's 2006 full-length The Rise of the Palace Depression ("a tremendously interesting release with a sound completely its own") as one of the top 100 disks of the decade 2001-2010, alongside offerings by artists such as Bruce Springsteen, My Chemical Romance, Fountains of Wayne, and Bouncing Souls, in his book Are You Listening? The CK5 song "Sweet Baby Jane" was likewise listed as the 72nd greatest Garden State offering of the same decade. The book was the product of six months of research for Wien, during which time he listened to over 2,200 releases by New Jersey artists.

CK5 were reviewed in the 2009 book Music to Die For by former Melody Maker journalist Mick Mercer, published by Cherry Red Books, as part of that book's sub-titular international "Last Great Underground Scene."

Fitting for a band that has been so inspired by some of its famous alumni, CK5 is one of many bands whose logo can be found represented among the collection of graffiti and stickers on the walls of CBGB in the coffee table book CBGB: Decades of Graffiti by Christopher D. Salyers. The band played the legendary club regularly during the time that both entities were extant.

Steppin' Out magazine and Jersey Style columnist Josh Davidson has written that CK5 "plays a new brand of rock, drawing from some of its rawest composers like Chuck Berry, Eddie Cochran and Joey Ramone."

Ray Lujan of influential punk rock periodical Maximum Rock n' Roll included CK5's Unbeatable Cry CD as one of his top 10 recent recordings in the March 28, 2012 issue.

Dan Armonaitis of Spartanburg Herald compared the band to The Dictators and Iggy and the Stooges.

A writer for the Trentonian referred to CK5 as "punk-a-billy giants".

Scott Cronick from The Press of Atlantic City opined that "when it comes down to it, there's nothing really ordinary about The Cryptkeeper Five".

Jose Diaz of Ink 19 magazine noted that Johnny Ott has a "Elvis-by-way-of-the Misfits" bearing, and described the band's music as having a "muscular, loud, and fast garage punk sound with rockabilly influences."

== Discography ==
=== Albums ===
Year	Title	Label	Format
1998	Dear Dr. X... I Wanna Be The Creature	Deathrock Records	CD
1999	Pomade & Switchblades		CD
2000	And Their God-Damn Rock N' Roll		CD
2002	Trenton Makes the Cryptkeeper Five	Peephole	CD
2005	Pomade, Switchblades, & Their God-Damn Rock N' Roll		CD
2006	The Rise of the Palace Depression	Bony Orbit	CD
2006	Darker Days	Bony Orbit	CD
2012	The Unbeatable Cry	Pure White	CD
2017	The Stronghold	Pure White/ Say-10 Records	CD, vinyl

=== Split EPs ===
Year	Title	Label	Format	Other information
2007	The Blitzkid/Cryptkeeper Five	No Balls Records	CD	Split with Blitzkid
2013	Split Personalities	The Black Sneer	10" LP	Split with Blitzkid

=== Compilation appearances ===
Year	Title	Label	Format	Other information
2000	Gothabilly II: Rockin' Necropolis	Skully Records	CD	With the Ghastly Ones and Ghoultown
2003	Kiss This: A Main Man Tribute to Kiss	Main Man Records	CD	With the Donnas
2004	Serving the Best in Rock N' Roll	Peephole Records	CD	With the Groovie Ghoulies and the Queers
2004	This is Horrorpunk, Volume 1	Fiendforce Records	CD	With Nekromantix and Mad Sin
2006	Where the Rockets Explode Vol 6.6.6	Bony Orbit Records	CD	With the Dwarves and Leftöver Crack
2010	Most People are Dead	I Hate People Records	CD	With the Chuck Norris Experiment
