= Michael Montes =

Michael Montes is a Peruvian-American composer.

== Life and career ==
Michael Montes was born in Houston, the son of American nurse Anne Pryor and Peruvian doctor Mario Montes who came to the United States in the early fifties. The family eventually settled in Eden, NY.

He began piano studies at age seven, quit in frustration with his teacher's methods, returned feverishly on his own at age thirteen and later dropped out of medical school in order to pursue composition as his life's work.

As a child his first film music experience occurred while watching the Jules Verne classic Mysterious Island. Years later he discovered that Bernard Herrmann had composed the score.

Later on Pink Floyd became an influence, specifically their innovative production techniques and use of hallucinatory textures.

While studying at Bard College he played in jazz groups, wrote and performed experimental music for dance and joined the chamber choir that specialized in the works of Renaissance composer Josquin des Prez.

After school he steeped himself in the worlds of Brian Eno, tape loops and musique concrète while working on his first commissioned piece, A Porcelain Dream, for modern dance troupe Floorplay.

Moving to New York City he began an extended period of composing in every possible format for thousands of television commercials while collecting multiple Clio and AICP awards. Several of his pieces are included in the permanent collection of New York's Museum of Modern Art.

He was brought in to work with Aimee Mann's band 'Til Tuesday as keyboardist for their studio album Everything's Different Now and subsequent tour.

He created the Zoar project, a series of dark atmospheric albums, with guitarist Peter Rundquist and cellist Erik Friedlander. The debut album, Cassandra, was released on the Philip Glass label Point Music.

He began a collaboration with noted filmmaker Bill Morrison scoring his films Ghost Trip, Trinity and more recently Her Violet Kiss which in addition to screenings at MoMA and The Louvre has appeared in film festivals worldwide.

He conceived and produced cellist Erik Friedlander's breakthrough solo album Maldoror.

Allan Kozinn of The New York Times called his String Quartet No. 2 performed by Ethel "an experiment in intensity...a forceful wave of sound."

He has been the composer of choice for The TED Conference, The Nobel Prize Summit, The World Science Festival and The AICP Show. His TedTalks opening title music has enjoyed billions of views.

He has composed scores for numerous films including Joan Stein's Oscar nominated One Day Crossing, Alexander Olch's The Windmill Movie, Michael Tully's Ping Pong Summer and Sophia Takal's Always Shine.

His latest personal albums are Persona Ficta, When the World Was Now and Acorn Blue.

== Filmography ==
- First They Came for My College (2026)
- Wooden Hearts (2025)
- Poundcake (2023)
- Her Violet Kiss (short) (2021)
- Scenes From an Empty Church (2021)
- Tes Yeux Mourants - That Cold Dead Look in Your Eyes (2021)
- The Oil War (2020)
- Into the Dark: New Year, New You (2019)
- Saeed (short) (2019)
- The Changing Same (2018)
- City of Joel (documentary) (2018)
- The Sweet Requiem (2018)
- Funeral (short) (2018)
- Don't Leave Home (2018)
- Brigsby Bear (additional music) (2017)
- Always Shine (2016)
- To Die or to Dream (short) (2015)
- King Georges (documentary) (2015)
- Applesauce (2015)
- Wild Canaries (2014)
- Ping Pong Summer (2014)
- 35 Year Old Man (short) (2012)
- Welcome to the Machine (documentary) (2012)
- Danland (documentary) (2012)
- Septien (2011)
- Consent (2010)
- Prescott Place (short) (2010)
- Private Party (short) (2009)
- The Windmill Movie (documentary) (2008)
- Kung Fu Granny (short) (2008)
- Slaying Goliath (documentary) (2008)
- Able Danger (2008)
- Red Dog. Scooter. Applesauce. (2006)
- The Lovers (short) (2006)
- 10 Days That Unexpectedly Changed America: Gold Rush (TV series documentary) (2006)
- Solidarity. (short) (2005)
- Live at Five (short) (2005)
- A Perfect Fit (2005)
- City Minutes (short) (2005)
- America Brown (2004)
- Belle (short) (2004)
- Sunset Town (short) (2003)
- Trinity (short) (2002)
- Secrets of the Dead (TV series documentary) (2002–2011)
- One Day Crossing (short) (2001)
- Majestic (video game) (2001)
- Ghost Trip (short) (2001)
- Remembering Marshall: Thirty Years Later (TV documentary) (2000)
- Whipped (2000)
- Cusp (short) (2000)
- I Remember (short) (1999)
- The Headhunter's Sister (1997)
- MugShot (1996)
- Covert Action (1988)
- Firehouse (1987)
- Hangmen (1987)
- Pumping Iron II: The Women (1985)

== Discography ==
=== Solo ===
- Acorn Blue (2023)
- When the World Was Now (2021)
- That Cold Dead Look in Your Eyes (Original Motion Picture Soundtrack) (2021)
- The Oil War (Original Motion Picture Soundtrack) (2021)
- Scenes From an Empty Church (Original Motion Picture Soundtrack) (2021)
- Don't Leave Home (Original Motion Picture Soundtrack) (2018)
- Persona Ficta (2017)
- Always Shine (Original Motion Picture Soundtrack) (2017)
- King Georges (Original Motion Picture Soundtrack) (2016)
- Wild Canaries (Original Motion Picture Soundtrack) (2015)
- Ping Pong Summer (Original Motion Picture Score) (2014)
- Welcome to the Machine (Original Motion Picture Soundtrack) (2014)
- Danland (Original Motion Picture Soundtrack) (2012)
- The Earlier Time (2011)
- Septien (Original Motion Picture Soundtrack) (2011)
- Filmscores (2010)
- Chamber Works (2009)
- Piano at Dusk (2009)
- Such Siren Worlds (2008)

=== Zoar ===
- Clouds Without Water (2003)
- In the Bloodlit Dark (2001)
- Cassandra (1997)
