= Uakti =

Uakti may refer to:

- Uakti (myth), a mythical musician described by the Tukano Indians of South America
- Uakti (band), a Brazilian percussion quartet
