= Point Music =

Record label

Point Music was a record label that was started in 1992 as a joint venture between Philips Classics and Michael Riesman and Philip Glass’s Euphorbia Productions. In 1999, Decca Records became its distributor when it absorbed Philips in the aftermath of the merger that created Universal Music. It originally specialized in cutting-edge contemporary Western classical music, but it expanded to include film scores, some world music, and rock–classical crossover projects. It was shut down in 2002.

In September 2009, Universal Music released a POINT Music compilation named XVI Reflections on Classical Music, which explored the connections between cutting edge classical and electronic music. Whether this is the beginning of a series of compilations has yet to be confirmed.

== Partial discography ==
- Master Musicians of Jajouka—Brian Jones Presents the Pipes of Pan at Jajouka
- Master Musicians of Jajouka featuring Bachir Attar—The Master Musicians of Jajouka featuring Bachir Attar
- Jon Gibson—In Good Company
- Philip Glass - Low Symphony
- Gavin Bryars - Jesus' Blood Never Failed Me Yet
- Gavin Bryars—Man in a Room, Gambling
- Gavin Bryars—Cadman Requiem
- Arthur Russell—Another Thought
- Gavin Bryars—The Sinking of the Titanic
- London Philharmonic Orchestra—The LPO Plays the Music of Pink Floyd
- London Philharmonic Orchestra—Kashmir: Symphonic Led Zeppelin
- Philip Glass/Uakti—Aguas da Amazonia
- Uakti— I Ching
- Uakti—Mapa
- Uakti—Trilobyte
- Oceania—Oceania
- Bang on a Can—Music for Airports—Brian Eno
- Gavin Bryars—The Raising of the "Titanic"
- Arthur Russell—Another Thought (Radio Edits)
- Gavin Bryars—Raising the Titanic—the Aphex Twin Mixes
- Philip Glass—"Heroes" Symphony
- Zoar—Cassandra
- Todd Levin—Ride the Planet
- John Moran—The Manson Family: An Opera
- Philip Glass & Foday Musa Suso—Music from the Screens
- Jaron Lanier—Instruments of Change
- Chris Hughes—Shift
- Philip Glass—“Heroes Symphony” (the Aphex Twin Remix)
- Angelo Badalamenti—City of Lost Children—Original Soundtrack
- Giovanni Sollima—Aquilarco
- Pilgrimage—9 Songs of Ecstasy
- Philip Glass, Gavin Bryars and others—XVI Reflections on Classical Music

== See also ==
- List of record labels
- Philips Records
- Decca Records
- Philip Glass
