= John Moran (composer) =

American composer and choreographer (born 1965)

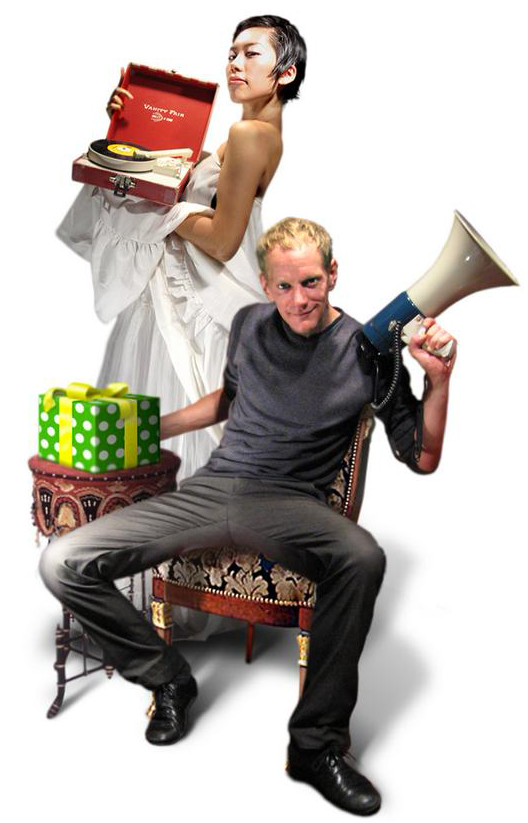
- A publicity still from John Moran...and his neighbor, Saori
- Born: 1965 (age 60–61); Lincoln, Nebraska, U.S.
- Citizenship: USA
- Occupations: Opera and musical theater composer
- Years active: 1988–present
- Known for: The Manson Family: An Opera; Book of the Dead (2nd Avenue); John Moran...and his neighbor, Saori

John Moran (born 1965) is an American composer, choreographer, and theater artist. He has been called an "operatic trailblazer", and his works are variously described as "unconventional", "innovative", and difficult to categorize. His works bring together a variety of mediums, including recorded music, spoken word, choreography and dance, mime, lip syncing, and video. Additionally, his works have featured a range of performers, including actors Uma Thurman and Julia Stiles, as well as singer Iggy Pop, and poet Allen Ginsberg.

== Early life and education ==
John Moran was born in Lincoln, Nebraska, in 1965. He lacks a formal education in composition and in fact never graduated from high school. He unsuccessfully attempted to study informally at the University of Nebraska–Lincoln, where his father was the assistant dean of arts and sciences. But he knew he was drawn to composition and given his experience singing children's parts in operas. When the Philip Glass Ensemble was performing in town, Moran called all the Lincoln-area hotels until he found out where Glass was staying. According to Glass, "this skinny kid came up and gave me a tape, like all the skinny kids with tapes do, and, believe it or not, I listen to them, at least in a haphazard way. And I was struck right away. This was a born theater creator, even at that age, which was about 20".

He moved to New York City in 1988 at age 23, where he befriended and became the protege of the composer Philip Glass. He debuted his first opera the same year, in 1988.

== Career ==
=== Early career: 1988–2000 ===
Moran's first opera, Jack Benny!, was created in 1988, and composed entirely of snippets of sound from The Jack Benny Program television series. The piece was staged at New York's La Mama Experimental Theater Club, where it was presented by performance troupe Ridge Theater, and received strong praise in publications such as The New York Times. Although the work was considered a benchmark for modern composition at the time, the work itself was reportedly stolen in a Lower East Side apartment robbery, and has not been presented again. There are many unusual anecdotes about Moran's life at this time, including his living "behind the couch" of Philip Glass for several years, after showing up on the older composer's doorstep and announcing himself Glass's protégé. Glass himself confirmed such stories in several interviews (The Boston Globe, 1997 and The New York Times, 2000).

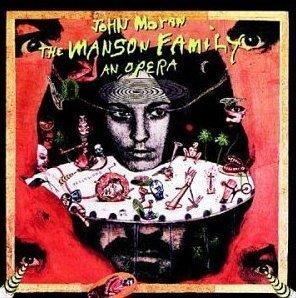
The Manson Family: An Opera

In 1990, Moran was commissioned by Lincoln Center for the Performing Arts to create his second opera, The Manson Family: An Opera. A recording of the opera, which starred Iggy Pop, was produced by Glass and released on POINT Music/Philips/PolyGram Records.

This was around the time that the National Endowment for the Arts (NEA) was under congressional scrutiny for its funding of seemingly "obscene" art such as Andres Serrano's "Piss Christ", and Moran and The Manson Family: An Opera were also caught in the crossfires of the controversy. Although the recording was almost immediately recalled by its parent label for obscene language and content (receiving one of the country's first Parental Advisory stickers). This is the only recording by Moran to present that has ever received public release. In another unusual anecdote concerning Moran's early career, Charles Manson was thought to have taken it upon himself to send a letter to Wall Street Journal critic Mark Swed who published a negative review of the opera.

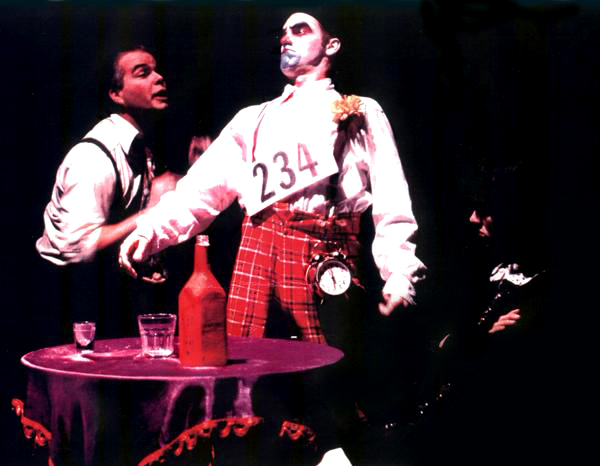
Everyday, Newt Burman by John Moran

In 1993, Moran's trilogy opera Every Day Newt Burman (The Trilogy of Cyclic Existence) debuted at the larger Annex space at La MaMa in New York City to wide critical acclaim. Owing to the opera, Moran was awarded a Bessie Award. Moran also received a 1995 Foundation for Contemporary Arts Grants to Artists Award.

In 1995 and 1996 his opera Matthew in The School of Life premiered at The Kitchen in New York City. The work featured vocals by poet Allen Ginsberg and a small part voiced by actress Julia Stiles. As a performer, The New York Times compared Moran with figures like Merce Cunningham and Twyla Tharp, and as a composer he received an Obie Award. In these later early works by Moran, one can find him expanding into work with theatrical illusions and detailed specifications regarding the works staging. The use of doubled performers, playing the same part were often employed in his scoring of these events, to mimic the effect of cinematic-style editing.

At the end of this period, in 1997, his version of The Cabinet of Dr. Caligari premiered at American Repertory Theater at Harvard. Concerning Caligari, The Boston Globe described Moran as "a modern day Mozart", but Moran himself expressed an unhappiness with the production, as well as the work's producer Robert Brustein and its presenting partner Ridge Theater, which apparently resulted in a tense and public split with the group. In a 1998 New York Times article the following year, Moran claimed to have seen his staging and visual ideas appropriated by the group, while being publicly uncredited to him by the group's director Bob McGrath. The article presented other points of view on the subject from the New York theater world of the time, but clearly marked an end to a decade of joint production by the two parties.

=== 2000–2005 ===
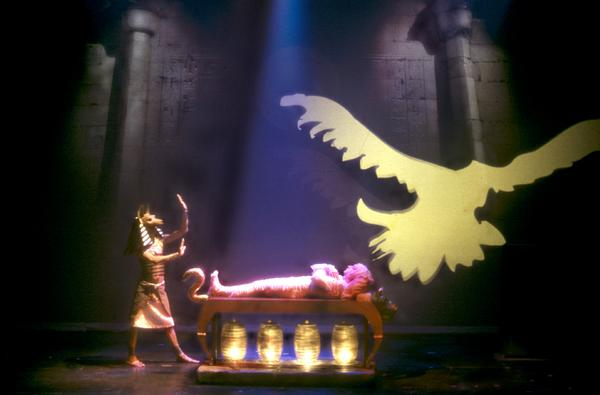
John Moran's Book of the Dead (2nd Avenue)

In 2000, Moran's opera Book of The Dead (2nd Avenue) was commissioned by Lincoln Center for the Performing Arts, and produced by George Wolfe for The New York Shakespeare Festival / Public Theater, in New York City and featured actress Uma Thurman as the work's narrator. The work received less than favorable reviews, however, and in later autobiographical works Moran himself described the production as "one of the most unhappy times of [his] life", owing to "the sheer mechanical hugeness of it all". The work (also designed by Moran) received The American Theater Wing Design Award (now called The Hewes Award) for "Best Theatrical Design in New York City (2000)".

Moran relocated to Germany and re-mounted his work Everyday, Newt Burman in 2001 at Staatstheater Darmstadt, where he apparently met German dancer Eva Müller who starred in the remounted production. Upon returning to America together, Moran began to create duet works for himself and Müller. Regarding these duet performances, TimeOut Magazine wrote that Moran had "reaffirmed his reputation as one of the most important (and underrated) figures in the avantgarde". Also at this time, in 2003, Philip Glass was quoted to say, "I am convinced that there is no more important composer working today than John Moran. His works have been so advanced as to be considered revolutionary." However, possibly owing to disappointing reviews from his ambitious 2000 work, Book of The Dead (2nd Avenue), Moran seemed to resign himself with smaller venues, such as Galapagos Art Space in Brooklyn, and Joe's Pub in New York City.

In 2004–2005 Moran spent nearly two years as artist-in-residence for Mairie de Paris (The City of Paris), however these were described by the composer as less than productive times. In later interviews, Moran related having buried the remains of his former works with dancer Eva Müller under a "popular landmark" in Paris, so that tourists would unknowingly take photographs of its remains. If true, this would likely be in an area of Montmartre, next the iconic Basilique du Sacré-Cœur, where Moran resided at the time. During this period Moran received fellowships from The American Academy of Arts and Letters and PEN America. But it was reported by The New York Times in 2006 that Moran had experienced a period of homelessness upon returning to America at the end of 2005, immediately after the creation of his highly praised work John Moran...and his neighbor, Saori, with Japanese-born dancer Saori Tsukada.

=== Collaboration with Saori Tsukada: 2005–2011 ===
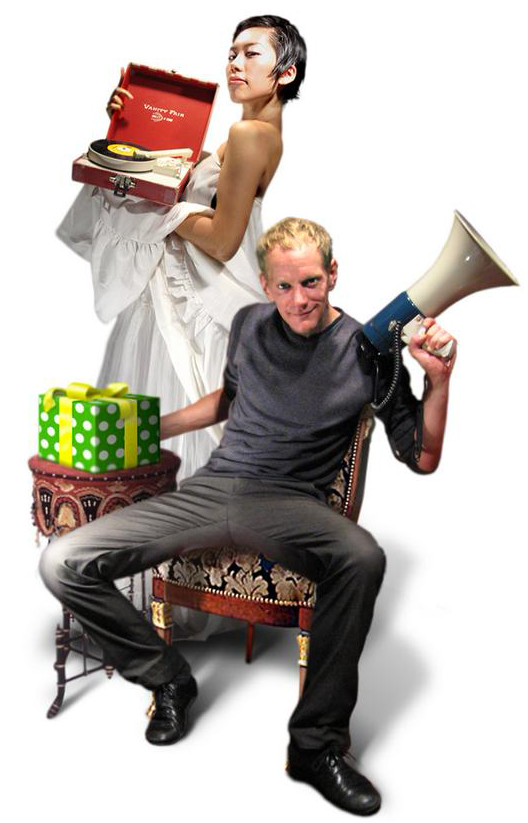
John Moran and Saori Tsukada

In 2005, Moran began to work exclusively with Japanese-born dancer Saori Tsukada, who in numerous reviews was described as a performer of unusual precision and stage presence. After seeing Tsukada from a distance on the street one afternoon, the composer knew the two strangers were "meant" to work together, and waited for her to return during a power outage in 2003.

This seems to have marked a shift in subject matter for Moran, who then began to appear in his works as himself, often telling highly personal stories about his bizarre life, and describing (in artistic terms) an "obsession" with his then next-door-neighbor, Tsukada.

In numerous articles Tsukada has been described as Moran's "muse". In Tsukada's description, "If I am the disciplined Japanese girl, then he is the picture of what people think of as a tortured artist.". Their collaborations, under the title John Moran...and his neighbor, Saori seemed to see immediate critical success.

In 2008, Moran relocated his career to play to almost exclusively to European audiences, along with a radical change in format. In interviews, Moran describes having turned away from the type of large-scale multimedia productions he was known for throughout the 1990s and instead began to create intimate works, often for one or two performers, sans any type of theatrical setting. His series of duets with dancer Tsukada saw praise and European touring throughout the years of 2005-2011. In 2007, The New York Times described the pair as "one of the most important and innovate collaborations of the year".

In addition to relocating their work to Europe sometime around 2007, Moran and Tsukada premiered several music, dance and theatre works between 2005 and 2010, all of which featured Tsukada and Moran portraying autobiographical representations of themselves. In 2007, The Guardian described the piece as "a work with genius as its foundation." and The New York Times cited their work as "one of the most important and innovative dance collaborations of the year". The two performed frequently at venues such as Edinburgh Fringe, Dublin Fringe, Amsterdam Fringe, The Arches, Soho Theatre in London, as well as other theatrical venues across UK, Germany, Israel, and Poland.

In 2010, Moran and Tsukada debuted their work, John Moran and Saori (in Thailand). Its crediting cited joint production between The Arches, in Glasgow, Scotland, and Pumpenhaus in Münster, Germany. The work received praise internationally, and toured extensively throughout Europe, UK and United States over 2010-11. It was presented at the inaugural Days & Nights Festival produced by Philip Glass in Carmel, California, in August 2011.

Other works by Moran and Tsukada include Saori's Birthday! (2007), commissioned by Performance Space 122 in New York City, and which in addition to Tsukada featured performance artists Joseph Keckler and Katherine Brook, and a somewhat minor work titled Zenith 5! which played at The Spiegeltent in New York in 2006.

=== 2012–2026 ===
In 2012 Moran unveiled a solo work titled, Etudes: Amsterdam, a joint production of Mayfest Bristol (England), Spoleto Open (Italy), and Fringe Amsterdam (Netherlands) which toured extensively throughout Europe over subsequent years. The work was premiered at Mayfest Bristol, England in May 2012, and performed frequently throughout European venues since its premiere. The work was described as a co-production of Mayfest (England), Spoleto Open (Italy) and Fringe Amsterdam (Netherlands). It won 'Best of Fringe' at Spoleto Open (Spoleto, Italy) and Amsterdam Fringe (Amsterdam, Netherlands) in 2012.

In 2013 Moran completed the trilogy of solo-performances with Goodbye, Thailand (Portrait of Eye), the third installment being a commission from Battersea Arts Centre (BAC), London England, and Mayfest Bristol, England. As a solo-performer, Moran was described by Venue Magazine (UK) at its premiere; "It is almost disconcerting, the ease with which Moran appears to leave his body, his own personality entirely vanishing to make way for the personality of the character he creates. His body language, the way his facial muscles move, and of course the voice, every aspect of a person is seamlessly brought together in a minutely detailed portrayal of the protagonists of the story."

In 2017, his 1990 opera The Manson Family received a new production in Germany, commissioned by Hellerau Center for European Arts (Dresden) and Schaubühne Lindenfels (Leipzig).

In 2019 Moran presented everyone, a work for 3 dancers and 2 musicians, commissioned by Residenz at Schauspiel Leipzig and Hellerau Center for European Arts (Dresden).

In 2024 Moran's first feature-film Für Joseph (originally titled Die Arie) featuring singer Joseph Keckler was commissioned by Hellerau Center for European Arts (Dresden), Schaubühne Lindenfels (Leipzig) and Germany's everyone company. The film won an award for 'Best Composer of the Future' from The San Francisco International Film Awards in 2024.

2025–2026 saw the premiere of a new duet, The Revelation, presented by Moran and Athens-based performer Vicky Filippa, commissioned by Societaetstheater (Dresden), Schaubühne Lindenfels (Leipzig), Zentralwerk e.V. and produced by Germany's everyone company.

=== Critical reception ===
Publications like The New York Times has referred to Moran as "one of the leading vanguards of American music-theater", and The Boston Globe has written, "Moran is a modern-day Mozart".

Moran has been twice commissioned for large-scale works of musical theater by Lincoln Center for the Performing Arts (New York), as well as American Repertory Theater at Harvard (Cambridge), The Joseph Papp / New York Shakespeare Festival (New York), Battersea Arts Centre (London), Mayfest (Bristol), The Arches (Glasgow, Scotland), Pumpenhaus Münster (Germany), Hellerau Center for European Arts (Germany) and others. He has received numerous fellowships and awards, including from PEN America, The American Academy of Arts and Letters, and the Foundation for Contemporary Arts. His work Book of the Dead (2nd Avenue) received the Henry Hewes Design Award for "Best Theatrical Design of New York City" in 2000, as well as a Village Voice Obie Award in 1995, and several Best of Fringe awards internationally.. In 2024, Moran's feature-film Für Joseph won an award for 'Best Composer of the Future' from The San Fancisco International Film Awards

=== List of works ===
His best-known works include Jack Benny!, The Manson Family: An Opera, Every Day Newt Burman (The Trilogy of Cyclic Existence), Mathew in the School of Life, Book of the Dead (2nd Avenue) and John Moran...and his neighbor, Saori.

- The Taming Power of the Great (1986), an album released on cassette, with Kristin Schleif, limited to 100 copies. Features material written in 1985 and 1986, including excerpts from two operas ("Changing of the Season" and "The Idiot") and a short ballad ("By the Sea"). It may have been released only in Lincoln, Nebraska.
- Jack Benny! (1988–89) Music-Theater in 3 Acts
- The Manson Family: An Opera (1990) Music-Theater in 3 Acts / Commissioned by Lincoln Center for the Performing Arts featuring Iggy Pop. Also released as a CD in 1992.
- The Hospital (1991) Music-Theater Commissioned By "Meryl Vladimer" for La MaMa
- The (Haunted) House (1992) Music-Theater Commissioned By "Meryl Vladimer" for the Club La MaMa
- Every Day Newt Burman (The Trilogy of Cyclic Existence) (1993) Music-Theater in 3 Acts featuring Julia Stiles
- Meet the Locusts (1993) / Point Music, Unreleased, featuring Allen Ginsberg
- Matthew in the School of Life (1995–96) Music-Theater in 4 Acts, featuring Allen Ginsberg and Julia Stiles
- The Cabinet of Dr. Caligari (1997) Music-Theater in 2 Acts / Commissioned by A.R.T. at Harvard University
- Book of the Dead (2nd Avenue) (2000) Music-Theater in 3 Acts / Commissioned by Lincoln Center for the Performing Arts, featuring Uma Thurman
- John Moran with Eva Müller (2003) - Variety of Performances
- Bonne Nuit (2004) - Commissioned by Agitakt Theater / Paris, France
- A Lake of Tears (For Cabell) (2004) - Orchestra and Computer / Commissioned by Musique Nouvelle en Liberte, Paris
- John Moran and his Neighbor, Saori (2005) - Variety of Performances
- Zenith 5! (2006)
- Saori's Birthday (2007) / Commissioned by Performance Space 122, New York City
- John Moran and Saori (In Thailand) (2010) / Commissioned by Pumpenhaus, Münster and The Arches, Glasgow, Scotland
- Etudes: Amsterdam (The Con Artist) (2012) / Commissioned by Fringe Amsterdam, Netherlands, Spoleto Open, Italy and Mayfest Bristol, England.
- John Moran: Goodbye, Thailand (Portrait of Eye) (2013) / Commissioned by Battersea Arts Centre, London, England, and Mayfest Bristol, England.
- everyone (2019) / Commissioned by Schauspiel Leipzig and Hellerau - Center for European Arts (Germany).
- Für Joseph Film (2024) / Commissioned by Schaubühne Lindenfels and Hellerau - Center for European Arts (Germany).
- The Revelation (2026) / Commissioned by Societaetstheater and Schaubühne Lindenfels (Germany).
