= The Manson Family: An Opera =

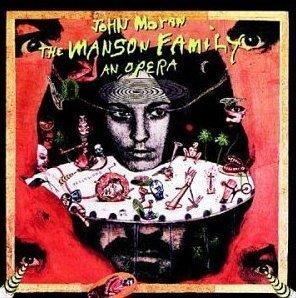

Studio album by John Moran
- Released: March 9, 1992
- Recorded: 1991
- Studio: Looking Glass Studios (New York)
- Genre: Opera; avant-garde; classical; avant-garde pop; minimalism; postmodern; psychedelia; rock
- Length: 53:16
- Label: Point; Philip Classics
- Producer: Clifford Lane; Roger Greenawalt; Philip Glass (exec.)

John Moran chronology
The Manson Family: An Opera (1992)	Matthew in the School of Life (2014)

The Manson Family: An Opera is the debut album by American composer John Moran, released in March 1992 by Point Music as one of the label's first albums. It adapted from the opera he staged at Alice Tully Hall in New York City in July 1990, as part of a festival at the Lincoln Center. The work explores the American criminal Charles Manson, the murders carried out by the cult he led, known as the Manson Family, the media circus surrounding Manson's trial and his charismatic personality. The 1990 production was Moran's second opera, though first to be adapted into a recording.

Produced by Clifford Lane and Roger Greenawalt, with Moran's mentor Philip Glass as executive producer, the recording stars Moran himself as Manson, alongside contributors like Iggy Pop and Terre Roche, the latter of whom using her soprano to portray Squeaky Fromme. Split into three acts, The Manson Family is a subjective and impressionistic work that, according to Moran, uses its characters to express wider textural, musical and philosophical matters. Unusually for an opera, there is no traditional narrative and little singing. Instead, much of the work is spoken word or orchestral music, based around vignettes. Moran uses sampling technology and sound effects to create the album's disturbing, avant-garde soundscape of sound collages, noise, dialogue, quotes from the cult, snippets of Hawaii Five-O, off-key pop music and pastiches of the Beatles.

The Manson Family was released with a Parental Advisory sticker for profanity, becoming the first example on an opera recording and one of the only in classical music. As with the 1990 production, the recording drew controversy due to its subject matter, but received critical acclaim for its courageous content. The opera has been cited one of several such contemporary American examples to explore real-life headline stories, alongside works by John Adams and Anthony Davis.

== Background ==
The Nebraska-born Moran launched on the avant-garde opera scene with Jack Benny! (1989), a somewhat vaudevillian collaboration with director Bob McGrath and the Ridge Street Theater company in which the composer cut, looped and manipulated recordings of The Jack Benny Show and wove them into a quirky, electronic composition. For The Manson Family, Moran's second major operatic work, the composer sought to peer into "the peculiar relationship" between criminal Charles Manson and those in his murderous cult, known as the Manson Family. Manson was in prison for organizing the Tate–LaBianca murders in August 1969, in which the cult assassinated six people in Hollywood, including actress Sharon Tate. Though Manson and three of the executioners, all young women, were sentenced to death, a change in Californian law instead saw them serve life sentences. In their feature on the opera, The Rutland Daily Herald wrote that Manson remained a fascination in the United States, "[his] legacy, a troubling and complex contrast of statements about love, freedom, society and environmental warnings and countercultural ideas gone mad persists."

Even before composing the opera, Moran considered the Manson Family's murders of Tate and Leno LaBianca to be a modern Greek tragedy, the "reflection of an era, and the ideals of a drug-induced '60s Summer of Love doomed to end in violence", according to the Times Leader. The composer was inspired to compose the work by the "musical nature" of Manson's control and the rhythmic, song-like quality of his speech, as well as his use of repetition to inspire his followers. "In the way of a revivalist preacher, it's not really what he says but the way he says it that's so captivating." Moran found parallel between Manson's use of repetition and the digital sampling technology used by the composer to create music out of everyday sounds.

Although the composer's use of tape granted him the ability to repeatedly play identical sections of the Jack Benny! score, it limited him to using radio and television sounds and restricted the acting parts. For The Mason Family, he wished to further develop his use of tape and sampling, as "you can't just do lip-synched operas for the rest of your career." By using digital sampling, Moran was able to sequence found sounds musically and combine them with the acoustic instrumentation of the live performance, while still being able to repeat individual sections as he wished. To allow the singers to keep up with his sampling, Moran introduced 'rhythmic acting', in which the performers were able to memorise an intricate array of text, music and related information, including pitch and inflection, which they were able to reproduce at each instance of the musical phrase.

== 1990 stage production ==
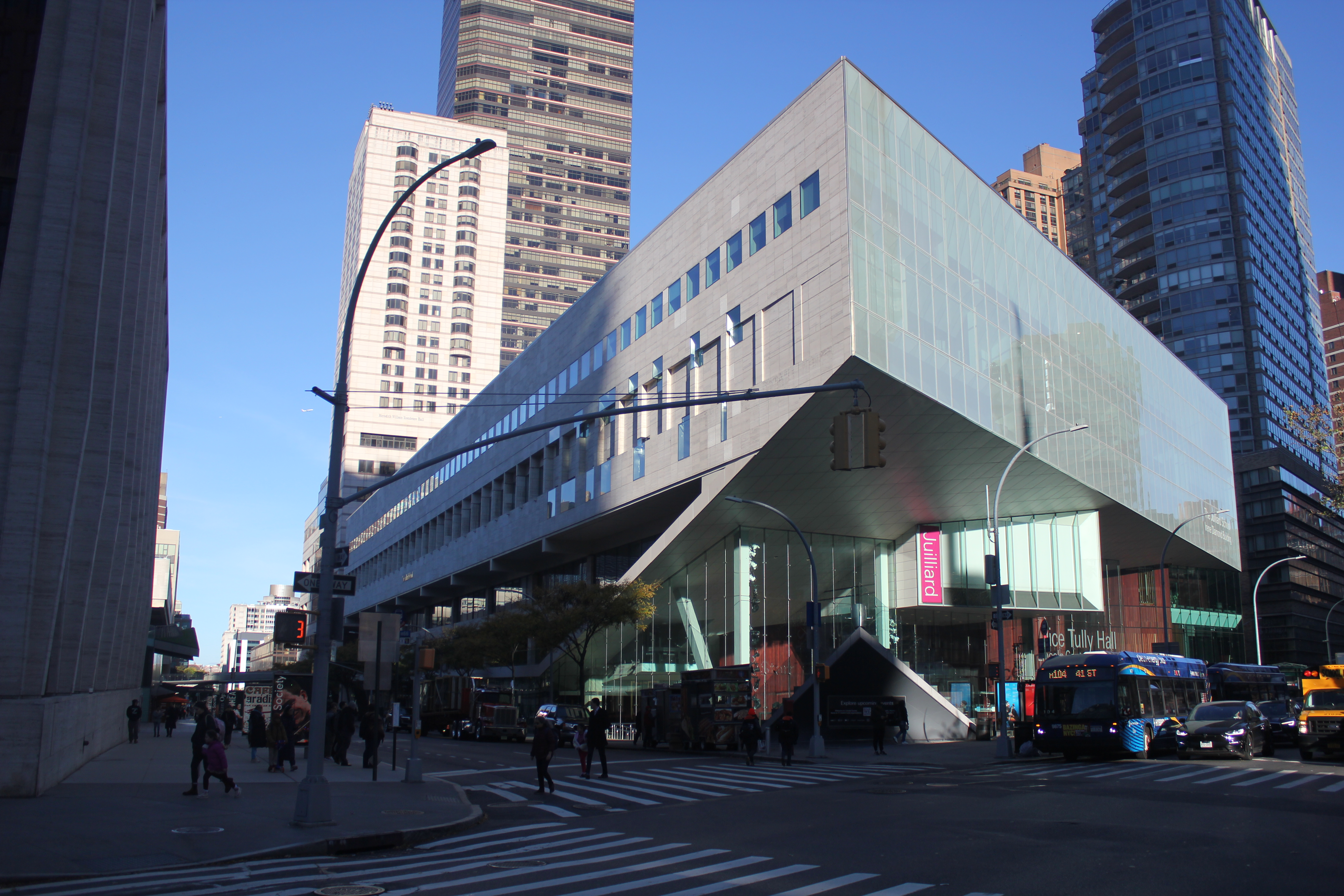
The Alice Tully Hall (2023), where The Manson Family opera was premiered

Commissioned by the Serious Fun! festival at the Lincoln Centre in New York City, The Manson Family opera debuted on July 17 and 18, 1990, at the Alice Tully Hall, performed by the Ridge Street Theater company. According to the journalist Joseph C. Koenenn, it was the most ambitious project that Serious Fun! had commissioned. Considered a collage-style multimedia production, and one of several musical docudramas of the era, it marked the operatic debut of Manson's persona. It was directed by Bob McGrath, a member of the Ridge Theater, and included at least eleven actors, including Daniel Harnett, Fred Tietz, Ann Shea and Amy Kowallis. As with the later album recording, Manson was portrayed by Moran himself. Alan Johnson was the music director. Two weeks of preliminary workshopping took place at Performance Space 122.

In an interview, Moran wrote that although people expected to be "freaked out" by the opera, "that's not what happens, because of the way the material is handled"; chiefly, he wanted to show that the Manson Family members represented "the same archetypes you find in Greek tragedy", and wished to make the point "that television has replaced myth telling. Television has all of the same components and serves the same purpose as verbal storytelling used to." McGrath likened the opera to The Bacchae, noting similarities between Manson and Dionysus, and the women in Manson's cult and the women of Thebes. Moran and McGrath both believed the opera neither glorified nor condemned the Manson cult. Instead of the case's original prosecutor, Vincent Bugliosi, the equivalent character in the opera was Steve Pentheus, based on Steve McGarrett, a detective from the television series Hawaii Five-O. The character was originally intended to be McGarrett himself, but after protests from CBS, owners of the series, Moran removed all references to the program, including the opera's original subtitle, Helter Five-0.

The 70-minute performance alternated between speech and songs, backed by live electronic accompaniment, films and slide projections. Moran continued to base his work on a repetitive layering that, according to John Rockwell, was comparable to "the sampling techniques of a rap group like Public Enemy", but unlike Jack Benny!, where the characters lip-synched to the taped samples, there was more live vocals and speech from the actors in The Manson Family. Combined with the use of live music, this made it relatively more conventional. The majority of the text was sourced from interviews with Manson, with the rest being written by Moran in the criminal's style. The largely electronic score featured Moran on synths, samplers and piano, as well as viola and keyboard parts; a minute of Manson's voice was also incorporated into the score, which was compared to the atmospheric style of Angelo Badalamenti. The slides and film, the latter by Film Crash, were incorporated into the set by designer Laurie Olinder. Film Crash's visuals were described as provocative and lurid. Projected text snippets were designed by Candy Jernigan.

=== Response ===
After its Alice Tully Hall premiere, critics from all the major New York newspapers printed reviews, one of which approvingly observed that the opera depicts Manson as the "creep he really is" rather than a folk hero, but the decision to make him the subject of an opera offended some parties, with one critic remarking that Moran himself should be jailed. John Rockwell of The New York Times considered Moran to be at the vanguard of American musical theater but found that, aside from a partial debt to Harry Partch's Revelation in the Courthouse Park, the opera was flawed for being "morally muddled and musically thin", questioning its equivalation between Manson's cult and American society itself being a form of cult, but finding more issue with its dominance on speech. Rockwell felt the often unaccompanied orating showed Moran "abnegate his role as an opera composer", and that the singing parts were unintelligible." Peter G. Davis of New York Magazine felt the opera could have been an intelligent, effective musical drama, but instead was underdeveloped and "clumsily worked out", a "shabby collection of shreds and patches" with an "unredeemably dull" electronic score.

== Album production ==
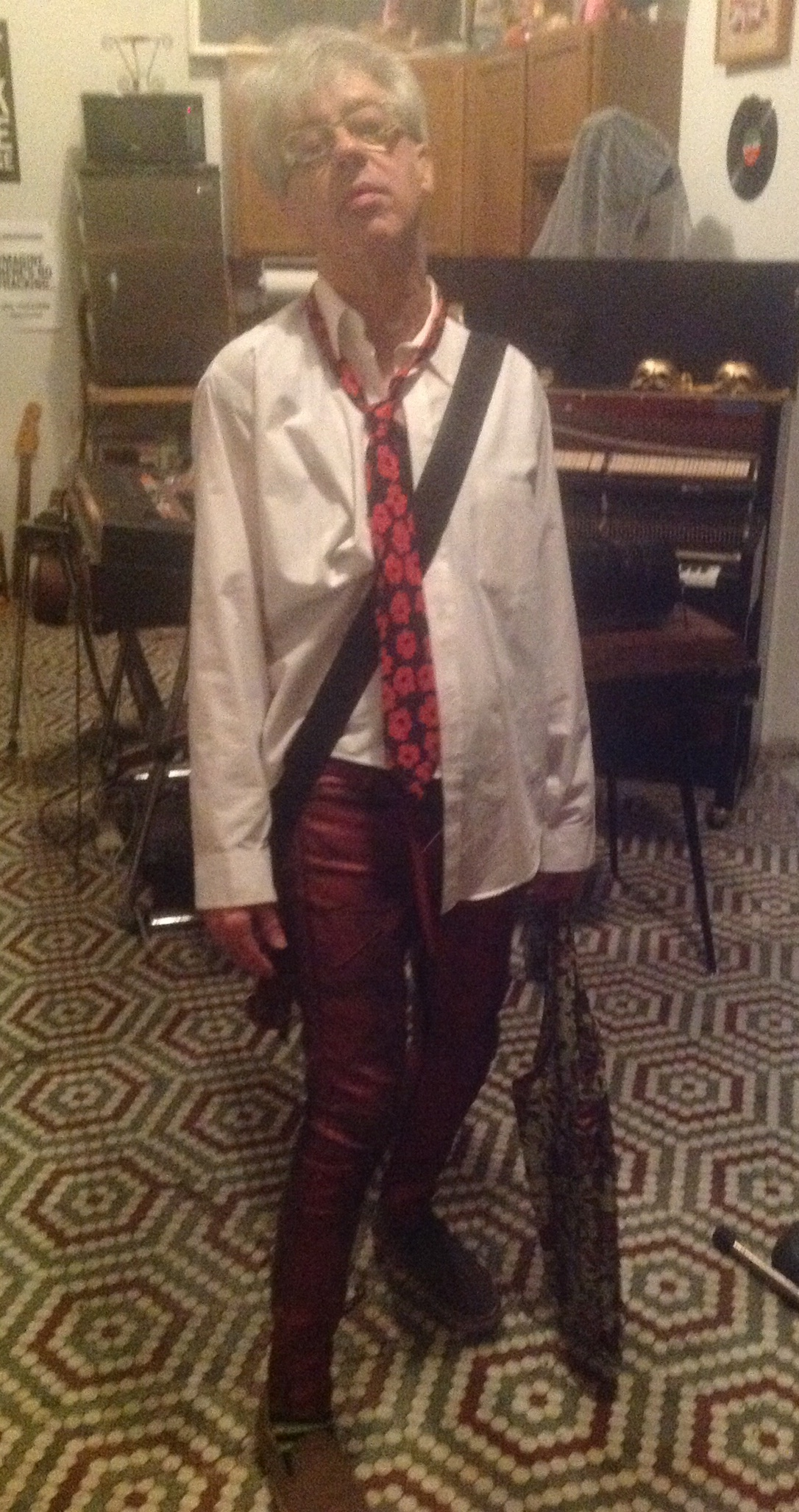
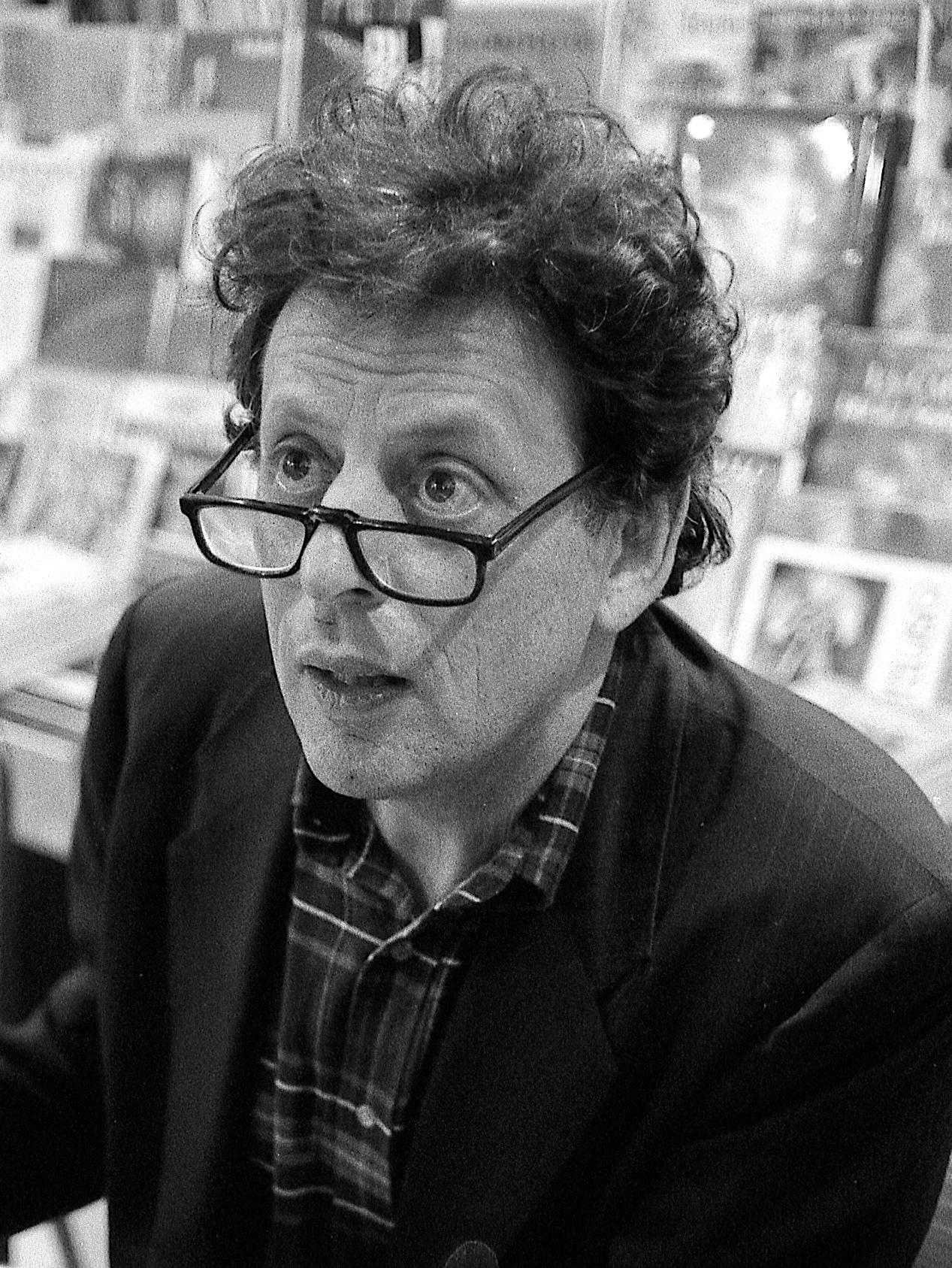
Producer Roger Greenawalt (left, 2014) and executive producer Philip Glass (right, 1993)

The album, The Manson Family: An Opera, is adapted from the 1990 Lincoln Center production, and was recorded at New York's Looking Glass Studios in 1991, with production from by Clifford Lane and Roger Greenawalt. Though the opera was Moran's fourth theatrical work, it was his first to be recorded. The avant-garde musician Philip Glass acts as executive producer, though some credit him as producer. Glass, who had inspired the use of repetition in the 1990 production, met Moran in 1986 when the latter handed Glass a tape of his work. Glass was impressed and encouraged the composer to pursue composing as a career, leading to Moran moving to New York for Jack Benny!. By the time of the recording, Moran was established as Glass' protégé.

=== Themes and characters ===
The Mason Family recording is split into three acts: "The Murders", "The Family" and "The Hall of Justice", with each character being positioned in different sets of environments. A graphic reflection of the titular cult, the opera is less focused on the murders than the media circus surrounding Manson's criminal trial and his popular reification. Moran calls the opera "an impressionistic portrait" of Manson, and emphasized that it is "not actually about the murders. The violence of the case doesn't interest me at all. What does interest me is the nature of Manson's charismatic personality." Moran himself had been in a cult as a teenager, and said he understood what it is like "to be so under the influence of someone so charismatic that you have trouble distinguishing what's their idea and what's yours."

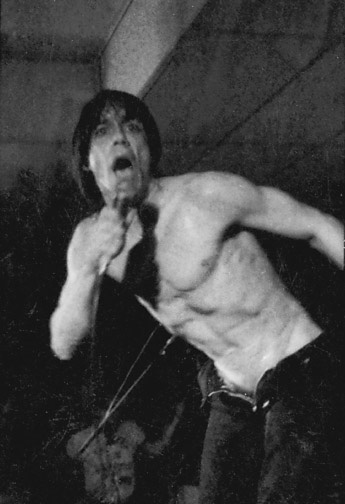
Iggy Pop (pictured 1980) voices the Prosecutor, Jack Lord.

The work is subjective and avoids a documentary focus or attempts at historical accuracy, utilising an ambiguous setting that, according to Kurt Loft, prevents it seeming voyeuristic. Moran commented that he used the majority of the Manson Family's leading figures "to express something larger than the events of 1969. They are represented in form and basic character only, to serve as empty vessels for this new material, textural, musical and philosophical." Moran himself stars at Charles Manson, delivering an eerie performance. The recording also stars Terre Roche as then-current family head Squeaky Fromme, Paige Snell as head killer Susan Atkins, Iggy Pop as the Prosecutor Jack Lord (based on deputy district attorney Vincent Bugliosi, who later authored a book about the case, Helter Skelter), viola player Robert Sortomme as Catherine Share, and Lane, McGrath and Greenawalt as the Courtroom Host, judge and Voice of Defence, respectively.

Roche's role as Fromme showcases her soprano. The singer, having previously worked with Glass on the latter's Songs from Liquid Days (1986), received the offer to portray Fromme a day after she explained the criminal's attempted assassination of President Gerald Ford to her niece: "Being a cosmically oriented person, I took that as a sign I should definitely do the role." Moran contacted both Fromme and Iggy Pop having already been fans of both, with Fromme being his first choice when he realized he needed a soprano. Roche was intrigued by how the opera spotlit the way in which the "idealistic-peace-love thing" of the 1960s descended into violence, and the thin line between both; she said the cast watched a selection of tapes to prepare for the performance. Roche remarked that, as a folk singer, she found it difficult assuming the role of Fromme because "just hearing where a lot of notes enter was very difficult. I'm not used to hearing music that moves harmonically the way that it did." She was impressed with Moran's "very specific idea of what he wanted", correcting her if she was half a tone off.

=== Musical style and classification ===
An English-language opera, The Manson Family does not follow a traditional narrative structure, instead favouring a nonlinear approach, juxtaposing unsettling vignettes about the cult's residence at the Spahn Ranch in California, the murders of Tate and LaBianca and Manson's subsequent trial. Unusually, there is also little singing, with much of the recording being spoken word or orchestral music built largely around "sparse piano, percussion, and burst of noise and media samples." Besides Roche's parts as Fromme, the arias are spoken over drum beats, tambourines and passionate viola parts, the latter conducted by Michael Riesman. According to Loft, the recording loosely uses the story of the titular cult to create an "avant-garde landscape of textures: hushed dialogue, amplified instruments, ambulance sirens and other experimental and ghostly effects." The critic Eric Salzman deems Moran's style to be a darker version of minimalism, noting that the recording's blend of repeated musical excerpts, distorted noises, off-key pop vocals, pastiches of the Beatles, and snippets of incoherent speech (including quotes of Manson) suits the "surrealist subject matter". The recording has also been described as darkly psychedelic, due to its 'cut-and-paste' and nonlinear approach.

Across the album's 19 largely self-contained segments, some only seconds long, The Manson Family spans "abstract sound collages to spoken monologues to pop songs to avant-gardish musical interludes, all unified by the dark force of their subject matter", according to the critic Joshua Kosman. Further sounds on the album include musical allusions to the Rolling Stones, "raga-driven calliope music", snippets from Hawaii Five-O, further quotes from the cult, moody soundscapes, heavy profanity, and sound effects. The Manson Family has been characterized as an opera by numerous sources, or as a "sort of" opera. Billboard characterize it as a 'counterculture' opera. It has also been described as a concept album, rock opera, and "alternative classical rock opera". Kosman deems it not strictly an opera, but a "postmodernist melange" with little singing and no traditional narrative. Similarly, the critic Ted Mills opines that, although 'opera' is an appropriate description as it is "a musical drama with grandiose characters and heightened emotion," the minimal use of singing departs from the form.

Salzman describes the production as exemplifying "the avant-garde side of pop", utilising modern audio technology. Mark Pappenheim of The Independent writes that Moran "creates entire environments out of sampled sound" throughout the recording, "setting a campfire sermon's of Manson's, for example, against a collage of effects – fire, burning woods, distant crickets, laughter." Moran describes the record as "not music with sound effects, but music created out of what people call sound effects. All the vocals are predetermined in pitch and rhythm – that makes it singing. The entire dramatic flow is musically controlled – that makes it opera. The fact it is Iggy Pop singing and not Pavarotti just makes it modern opera." Due to Manson's preoccupation with the Beatles and their 1968 self-titled album ('the White Album'), two interludes are based around the band's music, building upon their most psychedelic recordings and casting the group as divine prophets. According to the critic Walter Price, the musical introductions of the second and third acts were possibly influenced by Spike Jones.

== Release and promotion ==
Released on March 9, 1992, (Note: Catalogue number 432 967-2 in the United States and United Kingdom.) The Manson Family: An Opera was one of three albums issued to launch Philip Glass' 'crossover music' label Point Music, a subsidiary of Philips Classics Records, alongside Brazilian percussion group Uakti's MAPA, and Glass' and Foday Musa Suso's "Afro-minimalist" score for Jean Genet's play The Screens. Point debuted as a strongly avant-garde label, in contrast to "the otherwise mainstream" Philips Classics, and was "devoted to musicians outside the institutional or academic mainstream." The Manson Family was treated as the most important of the label's three launch albums and was "marketed in both classical and alternative rock stores." One selection from the album, described by Arthur Kaptain of The Gazette as "an eerie middle-American collage", appeared as one of several bonus tracks on a 1993 Point Music CD release of Glass' Symphony No. 1 (Low).

The Manson Family was the first opera recording to use a Parental Advisory sticker.

The Manson Family: An Opera was released with a Parental Advisory warning sticker, due to excessive, descriptive profanity, particularly the word fuck, in Manson's violent monologues. It was the first opera recording to use the sticker, and a rare example of it being used on a classical album, which, according to Kosman, "may be because nobody's clued in the nation's would-be-censors to the plots of Elektra or Die Walkure". The use of the Parental Advisory warning was played up in Point's marketing of the album. (Note: Billboard's Is Horowitz believed the record was "the first package marketed by a classical company (Philips) to carry a warning sticker to explicit content", but said he was later made aware of an earlier release, of John Cage and Joan La Barbara's Singing Through, which also used the sticker. He added that the sticker remained unpopular in classical music and that the Chicago Symphony's recording of Samuel Barber's The Lovers, released through Koch, should have merited the sticker too.) As Robert Kapler of The Daytona Beach News-Journal writes, the use of the sticker reflects how the recording slashed the convention that violence in classical music was "more suggestive than graphic" compared to rock music. The liner notes were penned by Alvin Eng, who describes the work as "musical theater in which belief is not wilfully suspended by virtually hyper-extended and put under subconscious scrutiny along with all other conventions." The recording's program notes and libretto are printed over doodles, illustrations and mug shots, making them hard to decipher.

The recording attracted controversy among the less progressive sections of the classical scene, more-so for being based on the Mason Family than its profane libretto. James Wierzbicki of The St. Louis Post-Dispatch said it would attract attention regardless of the warning sticker, as its subject matter alone "is enough to provoke at least curiosity from those who would be up-to-date on musical theater", believing it could trigger both optimism and outrage. Similarly, Loft found it uncertain whether opera audiences – "who by nature are arch-conservative" – will embrace the work's controversial subject matter. To coincide with its release, the opera was staged at the Puck Building, New York City, on April 13, 1992.

=== Cultural context ===
In a break with operatic tradition, The Manson Family was one of several contemporary American operas which received attention for being based on headline news, alongside John Adams' Nixon in China and Anthony Davis' X: The Life and Times of Malcolm X, the latter similarly recorded for album release in 1992. It was also one of several musical projects of the era that used the Manson Family as a subject, alongside Stephen Sondheim's musical Assassins (1991), the 1992 musical art show Helter Skelter, held at the Museum of Contemporary Art, Los Angeles, Jim Shaw's single release of the Family's song "Willy Nilly", and "California Hippie Murders" from Shimmy Disc performance artist Joe Coleman's concept album Infernal Machine (1990), a trend that Newsday journalist George Garbarino highlighted as coinciding with a rise of interest in Manson's own music. Squeaky Fromme was also portrayed in Assassins, leading to suggestions of a trend.

Geoffrey Wheatcroft of The Daily Telegraph wrote that operas like The Manson Family, Assassins, Priti Paintal and Richard Fawkes' Biko and Mark Anthony Turnage's Greek (staged at the ENO) raise "serious questions" as to whether it is suitable to write shocking librettos around such serious subjects. Graham Reid, meanwhile, grouped The Manson Family among numerous other modern classical works that saw a change in the culture of classical music towards more challenging and "less stuffy" content drawing on eclectic contemporary sources, alongside Nixon in China, Glass' Low symphony and 1000 Airplanes on the Roof (with David Henry Hwang), Robert Wilson's Einstein on the Beach, the albums of the Balanescu Quartet, and the Kronos Quartet's 1993 album with Elvis Costello, The Juliet Letters.

== Critical reception ==
Professional ratings
Review scores
Source	Rating
Calgary Herald	C

On release, The Manson Family: An Opera received critical acclaim. Reid writes, "while a few critics were repulsed by the subject matter -– there was no madness, murder or mayhem in Lucia di Lammermoor, right? –- others hailed Moran’s work as a courageous breakthrough and unique blend of traditional and contemporary styles." Stereo Review reviewer Eric Salzman praised The Manson Family as "a highly original, disturbing work" and described Moran as "some kind of extraordinary, cockeyed talent", hailing his creative use of technology and ability to combine unusual sounds in a manner that suits the surreal subject matter. He added: "If watching a slow-motion horror film on late-night TV orchestrated to the sound of freeway smashups and out-of-sync car stereos playing distorted Sixties music is your idea of serious fun, you may find this compelling."

In the The Tampa Tribune, Kurt Loft felt the opera, which "makes Wozzeck looks like Bambi", would appall traditionalists, but added that "those who relish contemporary challenges will find [Moran's] approach both inventive and invigorating, a tantalizing mix of Carl Orff, John Cage, Arvo Part and Philip Glass." Loft believed the work is as subjective as the Miloš Forman film Amadeus (1984) and was intrigued by its place in the wider context of opera, as many modern such operas similarly confronted contemporary subjects, opining: "The Manson Family fits in with this repertoire – if it makes it at all – with Nixon in China and The Death of Klinghoffer, as opera as current event." The Times Colonist critic Joshua Blake described it as a "surprisingly effective, stark soundscape" in which the various constituent parts merge to "create a haunting nightmare vision", recommending that listeners play the album in the dark to scare themselves.

In The San Francisco Examiner, Joshua Kosman wrote that this "sonic portrait" of the Manson cult is made more unsettling by "its patchwork techniques and generally nightmarish air of dissociation", finding partial concern with the "self-aware cleverness" and Moran's desire to shock, but deeming the "stark power" of the material "hard to deny". Eric Dawson of the Calgary Herald described the 'opera' as "a peculiar grab-bag of popular and avant-garde effects", largely favouring "much extraneous noise" and profanity over singing, and recommended that readers do not buy it for their parents except as retaliation "for all those years they made you listen to the Saturday radio broadcasts from the Met." Walter Price of The Los Angeles Times found it musically uninteresting and lyrically "pretentious, pompous and infantile", finding the dirty words to be "as numbing and harmless as all the others", and considered the spoken arias to be largely unprofessional. Commenting on the potential influence of Spike Jones on certain parts, Price felt that the presence of Ina Souez and Jo Stafford would have livened up the recording.

== Legacy ==
In a retrospective review for AllMusic, Ted Mills deems The Manson Family: An Opera less exploitative than its title implies, as it centres more around the media response to Manson and his reification; Mills particularly praised the two Beatles psychedelic pastiches for being "spine-tingling", nightmarish and brilliant, adding that, although the rest of the work is less impressive, the overall album "is a most frightening composition." In 2016, Rolling Stone included the opera in their list of "20 Great Iggy Pop Collaborations", describing it as the singer's most unusual role, while Verdict include it in their 2017 list of "The most interesting creative works inspired by Charles Manson". On Elsewhere.co.nz, Graham Reid called it "an anxious sonic nightmare full of chilling and relentlessly stalking piano, cross-cut cellos, motorcycles racing from speaker to speaker, and psychedelics gone sour."

Moran's next opera, The Circus of Eternity, was presented out-of-sequence in several parts over 1991 and 1992; the first part, "The (Haunted) House", premiered on April 9, 1992, at the La MaMa Experimental Theatre Club and, as with The Manson Family, featured a character named Susan Atkins. In their review, The New York Times wrote that the opera bore similarities to The Manson Family besides Atkins' name, such as its fascination with a cult, "with the manipulative Timekeeper standing in as Manson. On September 16, 1995, Moran appeared as a guest on John Schaefer's WNYC-FM show New Sounds to discuss and play selections from The Manson Family.

== Track listing ==
All songs composed by John Moran.

Act 1
"The Murders"

1. "Night Highway #1" – 5:05
2. "Tate House (Early Morning)" – 2:24
3. ""The Prosecutor" at Death-Train Station Five (The Tate House)" – 3:06
4. "Subject: The Beatles" – 3:59

Act 2
"The Family"

5. "Rape Music (Intro. to Act 2)" – 0:29
6. "Subject: Lynette (Squeaky) Fromme" – 3:14
7. "Charlie in a Field, Forever" – 3:47
8. "Susan Atkins on Night Highway #2" – 4:10
9. "Subject: Charles Manson (at Spahn's Movie Ranch)" – 4:52
10. ""Good Morning!"...it's the Beatles" – 4:06

Act 3
"The Hall of Justice"

11. "Raid on Spahn (Intro. to Act 3)" – 0:27
12. "Susan Atkins, on the Staircase of Justice (Leading to Night Highway #3)" – 5:46
13. "Night Highway #3" – 1:59
14. "Squeaky in a Boat" – 4:58
15. "The Family in a Courtroom ("Manson Leaps at Judge!") – 2:16
16. "The Judge" – 0:54
17. "Subject: Charles (No Name) Manson" – 1:34

== Personnel ==
Adapted from the liner notes of The Manson Family: An Opera

Actors

- John Moran – Charles Manson aka Jesus Christ, the Family (chorus)
- Clifford Lane – Courtroom Host
- Iggy Pop – Jack Lord as "the Prosecutor"
- Terre Roche – Lynette Fromme aka Squeaky, the Family (chorus)
- Paige Snell – Susan D. Atkins aka Sadie-mae Glutz
- Ensemble – the Beatles
- Joyce Bowden – the Family (chorus)
- Bob McGrath – the Judge
- Roger Greenawalt – Voice of Defence
- Richard Sortomme – Catherine Share aka Gypsy
- The Stars – "Who are We?"

Production

- John Moran – writer, composer, performer
- Clifford Lane – production, mixing, additional percussion
- Roger Greenawalt – production, mixing, additional percussion, electric bass ("Subject: The Beatles")
- Richard Sortomme – viola
- Kurt Munkacsi – executive producer
- Philip Glass – executive producer
- Rory Johnston – executive producer
- Peter Rundquist – additional engineer
- Laura Fried – additional engineer
- Paul Berry – additional engineer
- Dante DeSole – assistant engineer
- Friendshine – assistant engineer
- Michael Reisman – viola conductor
- Phil Yarnall – design
- Jonathon Rosen – illustrations
- Margery Greenspan – art direction

== See also ==
- Counterculture of the 1960s
- Cultural impact of the Beatles
- Violence in art
- The Art of the Bawdy Song (another classical album with a warning label)
- 8 Lust Songs: I Sonetti Lussuriosi (another classical album with a warning label)
