= Mister Monster =

Mister Monster may refer to:

- Doc Stearn...Mr. Monster, a comic-book character
- Mr. Monster, a novel by Dan Wells
- Mister Monster (band), an American horror punk band
