= Private Angel =

German rock band

Private Angel is a German hard rock band. They have released three albums, all on Point Music.

The band is from Nürnberg. Making their album debut with The Truth in 1999, Private Angel released albums sporadically while the members also played in other bands such as Wildcat, Vacancy and Maggie's Madness.

== Discography ==
- The Truth (1999)
- Selling Off Time in Wonderland (2006)
- Nailed (2011)
