= Meryl Vladimer =

American artist and activist (1951–2022)

Meryl F. Vladimer (August 14, 1951 – January 3, 2022) was an artist, theatrical producer and political activist.

Born in New York, Vladimer began her career as a noted and critically reviewed sculptor, and was featured on the cover of Artforum magazine. Disenchanted by the art world, by the late 80's she left art for multi-media design where she worked for Fannon and Osmond, Doug Mesney and the fifth Bartok and Staging Techniques.

Still not satisfied artistically she left corporate audio-visual to do multi-media design for theater, working first at Theater for the New City and later at La MaMa Experimental Theatre Club where she tried a variety of fields including stage management. This lead her to Broadway to stage manage "Haarlem Nocturne" a musical review created by André DeShields and arranged and composed by Marc Shaiman.

Returning to La MaMa, she resumed stage managing "The Club" cabaret theater created by Ellen Stewart in the style of the original La MaMa Theater, where one was required to become a member. Working there for several years, first under the direction of Rick Richardson and then Liz Dunn, Vladimer received the artistic directorship of The Club upon Dunn's departure. In 1990 while she was artistic director of The Club, Meryl was approached by Ellen Stewart, Founder and Artistic Director of La MaMa E.T.C., and asked if she would join the management staff as associate director of the entire complex after the departure of Wickie Boyle; she accepted.

From 1990 to her departure in 1998, she worked tirelessly for La MaMa E.T.C. Through creative fundraising and critical and commercial success producing in The Club, she was able to reduce an over half a million dollar deficit from the previous administration to just over fifty thousand dollars.

During her tenure as Artistic Director of The Club at La MaMa she produced two OBIE Award and ten Bessie Award winning productions, including:

- Blue Man Group Tubes - which, in the last 20 years, has garnered La MaMa E.T.C. over two million dollars in royalties from the Astor place and subsequent productions.
- "Stump the Host", "Stitches", One Woman Shoe", "The Little Frieda Mysteries" - plays co-authored by David Sedaris and Amy Sedaris under the name "The Talent Family".
- "The Hospital", "The Haunted Mansion" - works written and created by composer John Moran
- "Champagne" Written and created by Jackie Curtis
- "Lesbians who Kill," written by Deb Margolin in collaboration with Peggy Shaw and Lois Weaver, and "You're Just like My Father", written and created by "Split Britches" Peggy Shaw and Lois Weaver.
- "Belle Reprieve" written and created by "Split Britches" Peggy Shaw and Lois Weaver in collaboration with "BLOOLIPS" Bette Bourne and Paul Shaw
- Invitation to the beginning of the end of the world" and Based on a True Story" written and created by Penny Arcade (performer)
- "Triplets in Uniform" book and lyrics by Jeffrey Essmann music by Michael John LaChiusa
- "Black Water" - created and choreographed by Alice Farley
