= In the Bloodlit Dark =

Studio album by Zoar
- Released: 2001
- Genres: Instrumental rock
- Label: Middle Pillar Presents

Zoar chronology
Cassandra (1997)	In the Bloodlit Dark (2001)	Clouds Without Water (2003)

In the Bloodlit Dark is the second album by the instrumental band Zoar. The band's label describes this as the "lost album."

== Track listing ==
1. Wisteria 5:55
2. In the Bloodlit Dark 4:41
3. Nemo 5:31
4. Child of God 3:30
5. Spiderlace 6:05
6. Ghosts and Molecules 7:51
7. The Beauty of Obscenity 5:32
8. Nothing But This Light 3:39
9. A System of Senses 5:40
10. Another Sky 11:35
11. Secrets of the Dead 5:54
