= Ping Pong Summer =

- Film poster
- Directed by: Michael Tully
- Written by: Michael Tully
- Produced by: Jeffrey Allard; Brooke Bernard; Michael Gottwald; Lori Krein; Billy Peterson; George Rush; Ryan Zacarias
- Starring: Marcello Conte; Myles Massey; Emmi Shockley; Joe McCaughtry; Andy Riddle; Helena Seabrook; Maddie Howard; Lea Thompson; John Hannah; Judah Friedlander; Amy Sedaris; Susan Sarandon
- Cinematography: Wyatt Garfield
- Edited by: Marc Vives
- Music by: Michael Montes
- Production companies: Compass Entertainment; Epic Match Media; Indie Entertainment; Nomadic Independence Pictures
- Distributed by: Gravitas Ventures; Millennium Entertainment
- Release dates: January 18, 2014 (Sundance); June 6, 2014 (United States)
- Running time: 92 minutes
- Country: United States
- Language: English
- Budget: $1.5 million
- Box office: $52,909

Ping Pong Summer is a 2014 American independent coming-of-age comedy film written and directed by Michael Tully. The film had its world premiere at 2014 Sundance Film Festival on January 18, 2014.

Gravitas Ventures acquired the distribution rights of the film; they released the film theatrically and by video on demand on June 6, 2014. Millennium Entertainment handled the home release of the film.

== Plot summary ==
In Mount Airy, Maryland in 1985, Radford “Rad” Miracle (Conte) is a 14-year-old living with his gothic older teenage sister Michelle Ann Miracle (Seabrook), State Trooper Father Brennan Miracle (Hannah), and Mother Candle Miracle (Thompson), the family packs up for their annual summer beach vacation in Ocean City, Maryland, where on the way, the contentious relationship between the teen siblings is further exposed.

Shortly after unpacking, Rad walks to the nearby convenience store Anthony’s for an Icee and notices local heartthrob Stacy Summers getting into her Volkswagen Cabriolet, but before entering the store he is accosted outside by local bullies Lyle Ace (McCaughtry) and his lackey Dale Lyons (Riddle). Upon exiting Anthony’s convenience store, Rad befriends eccentric but kind-hearted teen Teduardo “Teddy” Fryy (Massey), an African American teen from Baltimore who, like Rad, is also going into his freshman year of high school. Teddy notices Rad carrying his Ping Pong paddle and insists on bringing Rad to the Fun Hub, an arcade located in the alley behind Anthony’s. While walking with him back to his family’s vacation house, Teddy becomes dismayed that the Miracles have rented the house next to Ocean City’s resident middle-aged weirdo Randy Jammer (Sarandon), who Teddy believes is a psychopath.

Rad agrees to meet Teddy at noon the following day, where Teddy notices that in addition to both of them loving Ping Pong, his new friend also shares an affinity for hip hop and break dancing. After entering the Fun Hub and before playing Ping Pong with Teddy, Stacy Summers introduces herself and her two friends to Rad, but her eyes are bugging out, causing Rad to ask if she is okay. Rad and Teddy play Ping Pong until Lyle and Dale enter, where Lyle physically abuses his ex Stacy, causing Rad to stand up for his new crush, upon which Lyle gets aggressive toward Rad, and Dale begins taunting Rad with several homoerotic insults which persist throughout their time knowing each other. Lyle commandeers the Ping Pong table from Rad and Teddy, who walk out dejected.

Outside the Fun Hub, Teddy, having vacationed in Ocean City enough to know of Stacy, Lyle, and Dale from prior summers, tells Rad that Stacy and Lyle used to date, and that Stacy is an addict of “Funk Punch”: an Icee laced with Pixy Stix sugar and cocaine, which Stacey can be seen drinking or having within arm’s reach at all times. The Miracles head to a boardwalk buffet for dinner, but Michelle makes a snide comment about Rad’s outfit, causing the two to scuffle and Brennan to shoo Michelle away, ordering her to find and pay for her own dinner instead of dining with the family.

Rad and Teddy continue to spend time at the Fun Hub on vacation, where the younger kids enjoy a beatbox lesson from Rad, which Stacey and her friends watch with enjoyment. Lyle and Dale once again accost Rad and Teddy, and Lyle challenges Rad to a Ping Pong match after saying sarcastically, “I hear you’re really good”. Teddy tells Rad not to accept Lyle’s challenge because he knows Lyle is the best Ping Pong player in Ocean City, but Rad accepts the match anyway. In the process of the game, in which Rad is obviously outmatched, Lyle calls Teddy a “black sissy”, and, frustrated by losing so badly, Rad tells Teddy to “Shut his greasy head up” when Teddy urges Rad to concede the match, causing Teddy to leave the Fun Hub in tears before the match is over. Rad loses via skunk shutout, 11-0 (the house rules of the Fun Hub stating that while matches are supposed to be to 21, trailing 11-0 is considered a mercy rule loss).

In an attempt to cheer him up, Stacy, having watched the match, brings Rad to Phillips Seafood Restaurant to share a Crab Au Gratin dip, where they discuss teenage angst. Rad asks Stacy if she smokes cocaine (trying to corroborate Teddy’s allegations), which angers her, so she excuses herself to go to the bathroom with her Funk Punch, where she drops a white powder into it and appears to zone out. Later that day, Rad is walking back to his family’s cottage with a gallon of milk he bought from Anthony’s, when, one house away from home, Lyle and Dale drive up beside him and assault him with verbal and physical violence (Lyle) and homoerotic insults (Dale), finishing the ordeal by pouring the milk over his head while he is on the pavement. Neighbor Randy Jammer appears, large dead fish in hand, ordering the bullies to back off from Rad, which they do.

The Miracles go to dinner at Candle’s sister Peggy’s (Sedaris) beach house in town, but Rad is feeling sad about the loss to Lyle, the way his “date” went with Stacy, and the way he treated Teddy at the Fun Hub by insulting his hair. The next day, Rad apologizes to Teddy for saying mean things about his hair, and they make up, followed by a time-jump montage of summer activities shared between the two friends over the next couple of weeks, including playing skee ball, eating ice cream at Dumser’s Dairyland, riding water slides at Jolly Roger, going to the movies, and eating at The Greene Turtle.

While miniature golfing with his family, Rad runs into Stacy and her friends, Stacy also having forgiven him for the cocaine question. Brennan comments to Rad on Stacy being very pretty while Michelle once again shows angst and refuses to putt, walking off. Later that day at the Fun Hub, Rad and Teddy start a Ping Pong volley that gets increasingly longer. With the other children and teens at the Fun Hub watching and counting along, they get up to 499 consecutive volleys without the ball leaving the table or hitting the net, and right when number 500 is about to be hit, Lyle and Dale walk in and Lyle snatches the ball out of the air, causing the large crowd to gasp in shock. Lyle challenges Rad to a grudge match to see who the better player is, which Rad accepts to the impressed nod of Stacy, and the match is set for the following Saturday.

Rad and Teddy hit the beach, where Stacey and her cousin Rhonda (Howard) invite them to H20 (Ocean City’s teen dance club), Rhonda finding Teddy to be cute, which unnerves him. That night, the four dance at the club, Stacy finds Lyle and Dale in the corner where she sneaks a sip from Lyle’s smuggled flask, Rad breakdances in a crowd of teenage boys who approve of his moves, and the four of them then hit the beach at night. Rhonda tries to hook up with Teddy who runs away scared, and, when she realizes he doesn’t have the courage to kiss her, Stacy leaves Rad on the shoreline. Rhonda and Rad then walk the boardwalk, Rhonda indicating she’d be happy to hook with Rad if he wants, but the two of them walk past Lyle and Stacey making out, which angers Rad enough to want to go home to the cottage. On the way, he runs into Randy Jammer on her way home from bowling league, and she asks if he is okay, showing genuine concern for her neighbor.

Later in the week, Rad and his sister go to Midnight Madness at the Ocean City Mall, where Stacey walks up to Rad and apologizes for her behavior at the club and the beach. Rad is done with her and tells her off in front of his older sister, which impresses Michelle so much that she realizes Rad is cool after all, causing a major shift in their sibling bond.

Rad begins practicing for his match with Lyle, and in search of inspiration, goes next door to Randy’s house. In her boathouse, he notices Randy’s bowling and Ping Pong trophies, and asks her to train him for the match. She agrees, putting him through drills and practice with a tiny paddle, improving his skills considerably. He and Teddy ask Randy to come to the grudge match, but she refuses. Teddy nicknames Rad “Radical Miracle”, Rad nicknames Teddy “Teddy Flyy”, and Teddy nicknames Randy Jammer as “The Rammer”, which Randy quickly shoots down.

On the morning of the match, Rad’s family, including Michelle, show him support, and surprise him with a new Nike windbreaker (that Rad was window shopping during Midnight Madness) which matches his parachute pants he wears for break dancing. At the grudge match, Stacy apologizes to Rad for her behavior, claiming the sugar rush from all of the Funk Punches caused her to behave erratically. She reveals she’s never done cocaine, and that she is swearing off sugary drinks from now on. She tells him that she has genuine feelings for him, kisses his cheek and says “kick his ass, Radical Miracle”, which gets Rad and Teddy pumped.

Lyle gets out to a big early lead, Rad forgets the mental skills Randy taught him and, while trailing 15-5, Randy interrupts Rad’s serve unexpectedly from the doorway, calling time out. She imparts some final words of wisdom and also tells him “now is the time to be a winner and kiss the girl”, which Rad takes literally and goes into the crowd to kiss Stacy, which surprises her in a pleasant way. The newfound courage starts his comeback, which contains several aces, until he pulls ahead 20-19. He serves gamepoint into the net forcing a win-by-two-points sudden death, which Rad wins 22-20 on a last second miracle return that taps the top of the net and slowly falls to Lyle’s side. The crowd all cheer for Rad (all of the kids and teens hating the way Lyle and Dale treat them), Lyle accepts the defeat, Dale cries into Lyle’s arms, Rad is announced as the winner, Teddy yells out “The Rammer!” in recognition of Randy Jammer as she exits the arcade, and he joins Rad on the floor of the Fun Hub as they both do The Worm in celebration.

== Production ==
=== Development ===
Director Michael Tully has said that the movie was inspired by growing up with 1980s Hollywood films, ping pong and sunny summer times in Ocean City, Maryland. With Ping Pong Summer he also wanted to pay tribute to those comedy filmmakers from the 1980s that took their time to craft heart-felt stories. Tully focused on breaking the "connect-the-dot" contemporary comedy by infusing personal experience and genuine characters. Tully grew up in Maryland, and he and his family vacationed at the resort where he shot the movie when he was an adolescent.

George Rush and Tully collaborated on the sale of Tully's last film, Septien. Rush had worked primarily as an entertainment lawyer, but took on the role of producer for Ping Pong Summer. Tully had been polishing the script since 1992 and was eager to make a movie so reminiscent of his childhood. The duo had a clear vision for the look and feel of the movie. They wanted to make a movie that truly captured the 1980s culture and felt like it was an old reel someone had found in a vault. Wyatt Garfield was instrumental in designing a specific look in the cinematography. Also, by casting generational icons like Susan Sarandon and Lea Thompson, they were able to pay homage to time periods that parents in the audience would be familiar with.

In the opening shots of the film, viewers see a boom box, Nike shoes, and a Run-D.M.C. tape, which, as NPR wrote, are "cultural markers that would clearly peg the film to a particular decade even without a subtitle further specifying the year: 1985."

=== Pre-production ===
The production opened up in Ocean City, Maryland. According to Tully the town was excellent at preserving the nostalgic feel of summer vacations. The local authorities and citizens were very cooperative with the filmmakers. To further capture the style of the movie, the entire picture was shot on Super 16 film stock. Tully felt very passionate about this choice and it was approved by Rush and the other producers.

The film was shot in Ocean City, Maryland, marking the first time since 1986 (Violets Are Blue) that a movie was filmed there.

=== Cast ===
Main cast and characters for Ping Pong Summer
Actor
Susan Sarandon
John Hannah
Lea Thompson
Amy Sedaris
Judah Friedlander
Robert Longstreet
Marcello Conte
Maddie Howard
Image

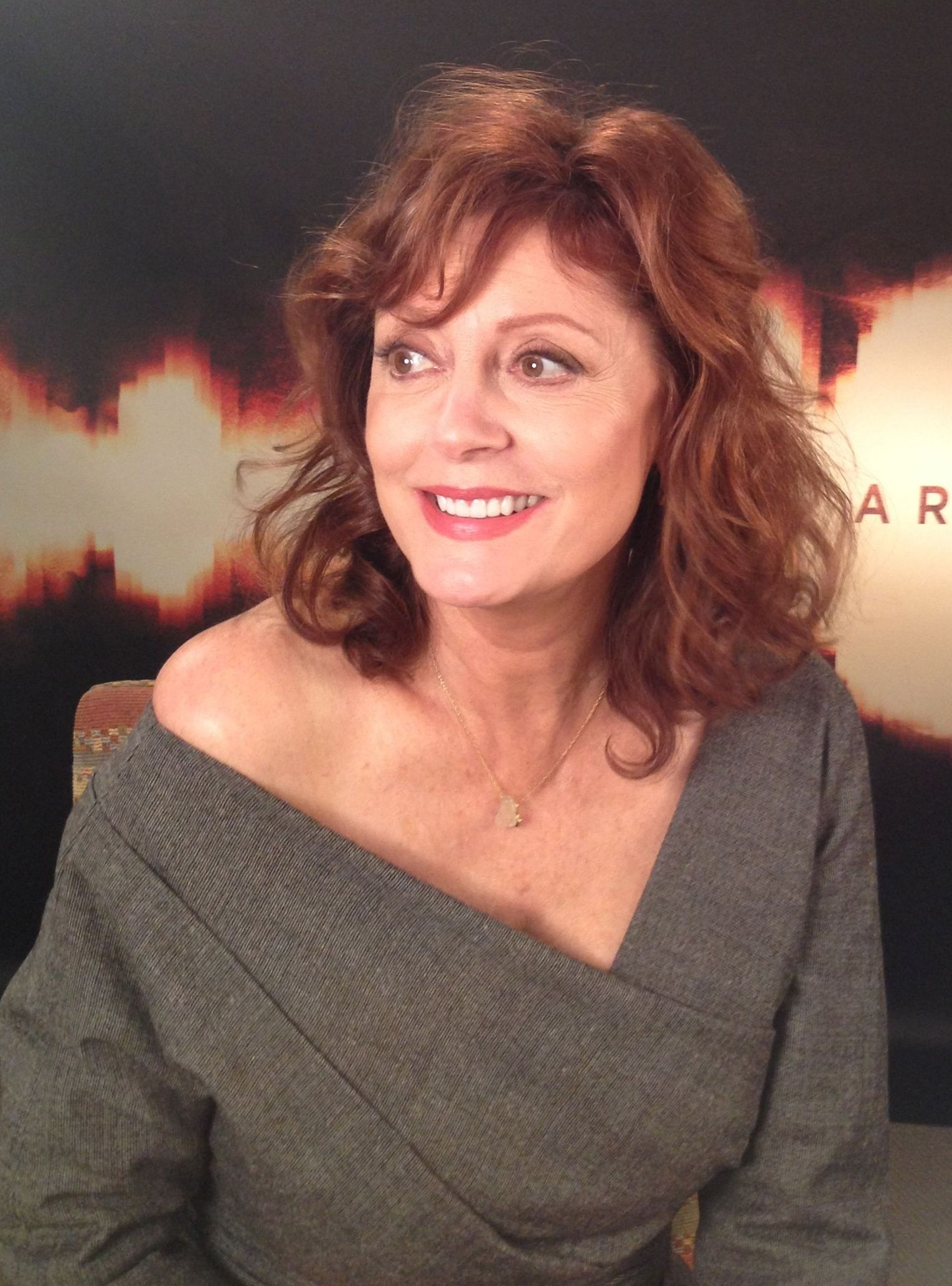

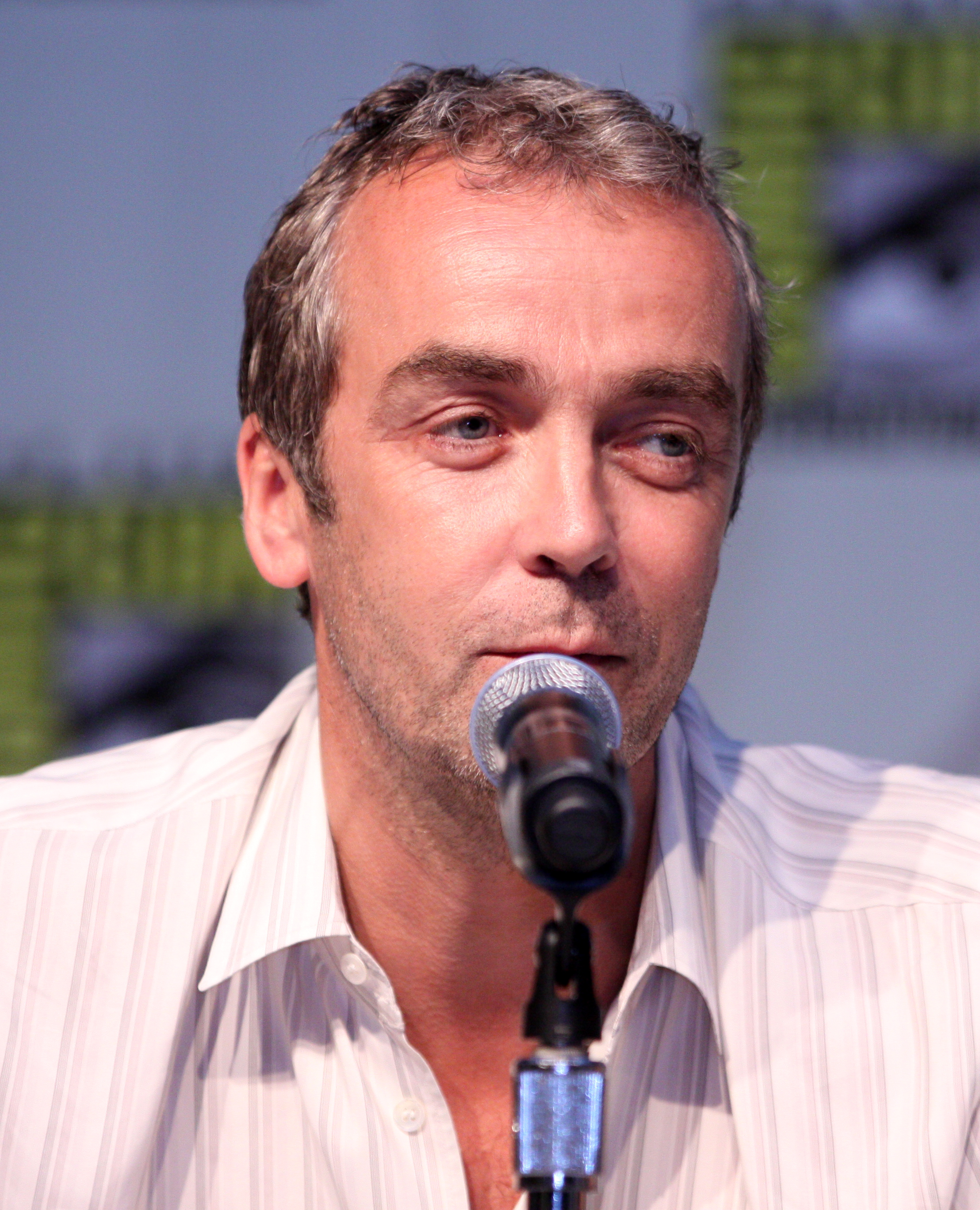

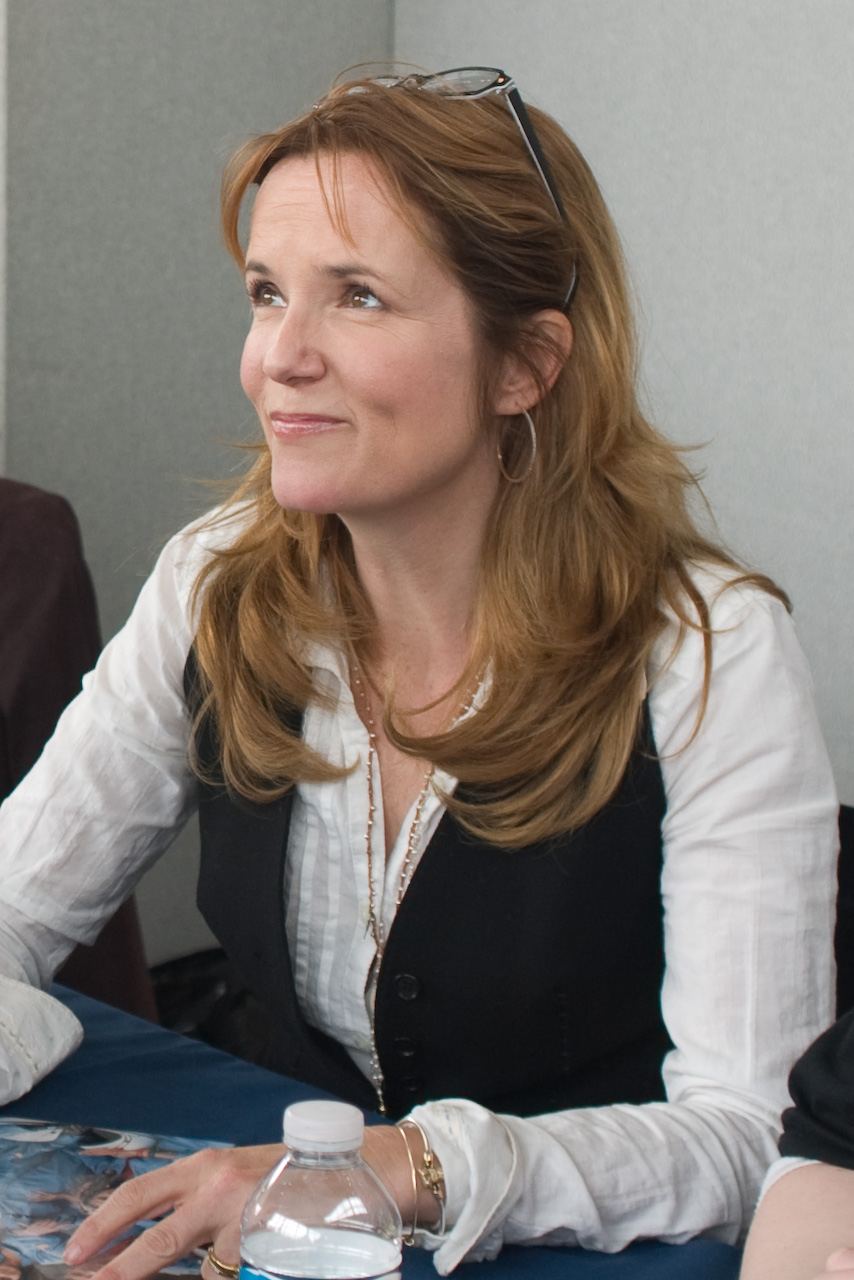

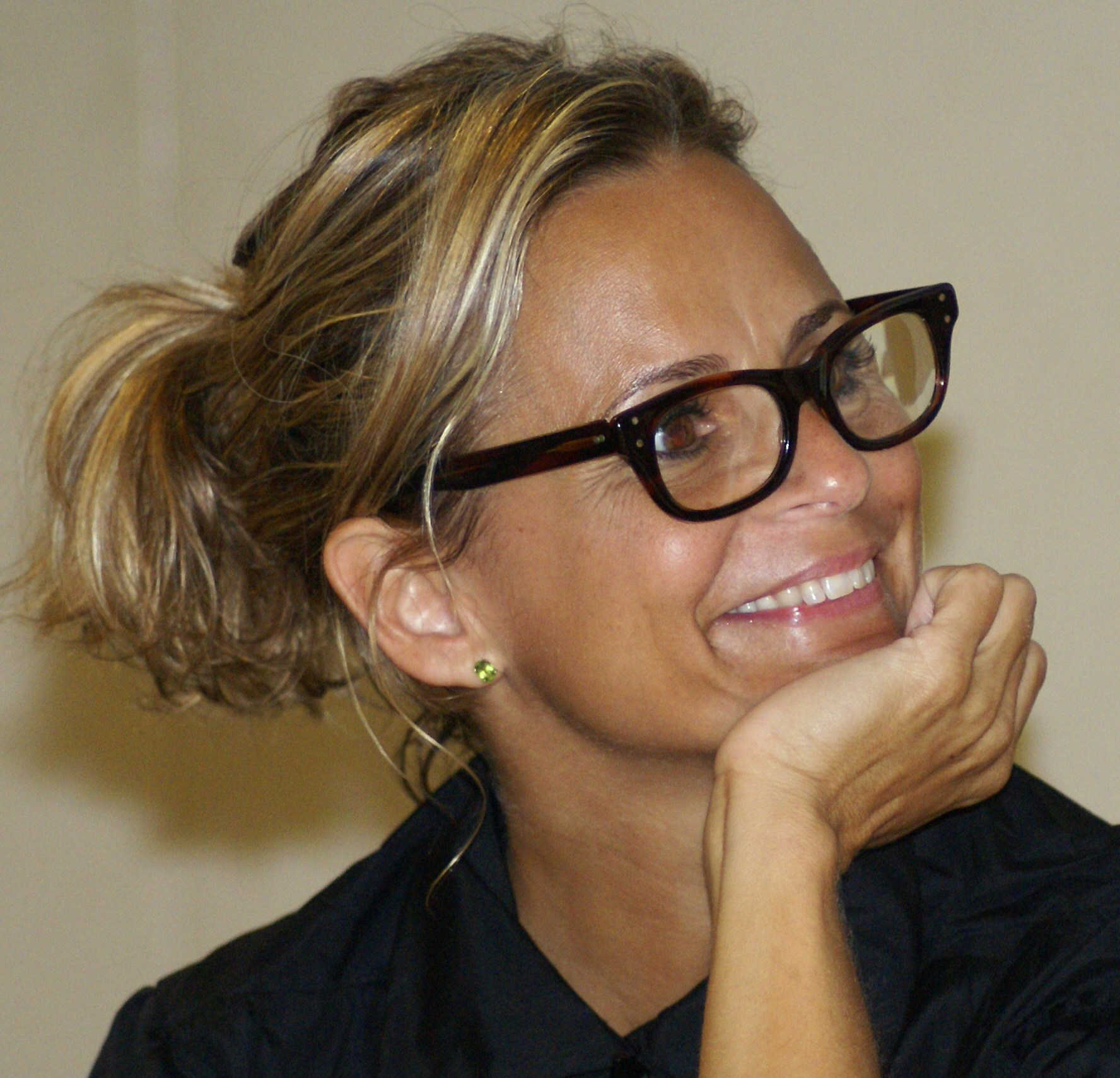

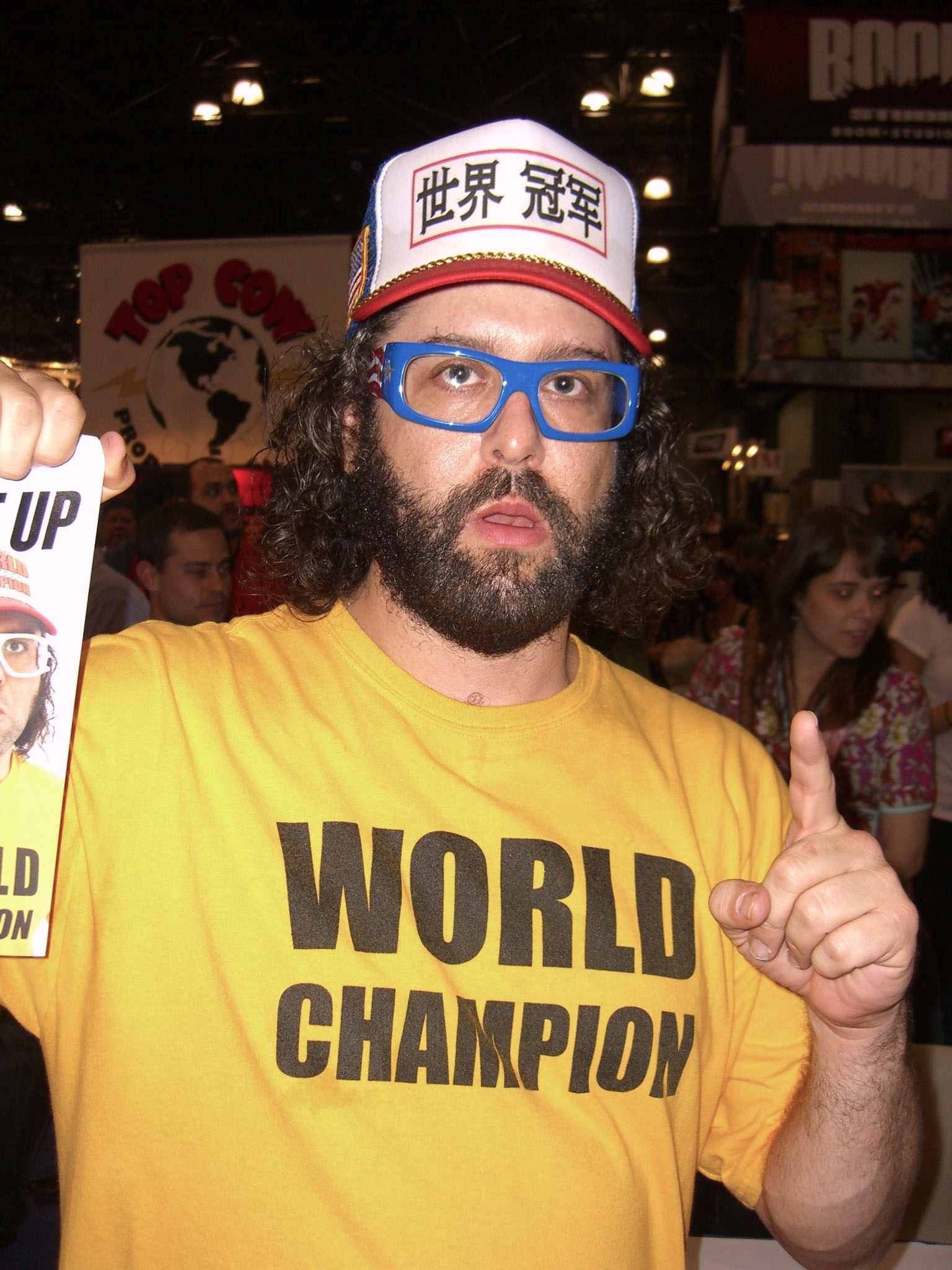

Character
"Randi Jammer"
"Mr. Miracle"
"Mrs. Miracle"
"Aunt Peggy"
"Anthony"
"Uncle Jim"
"Rad Miracle"
"Rhonda"

== Awards ==
Ping Pong Summer played at the 2014 Sarasota Film Festival where it won the Audience Award for Best Narrative Feature Film.

== Reception ==
Ping Pong Summer received mixed reviews from critics. Review aggregator Rotten Tomatoes reports that 59% of 34 film critics have given the film a positive review, with a rating average of 5.7 out of 10.

Justin Lowe in his review for The Hollywood Reporter praised the film, saying that "Rose-tinted as the film's perspective may be, Ping Pong Summer is still a lingering, entertaining glance back at an era that Americans just can't seem to get enough of, whether in music or movies." Mark Adams of Screen International wrote that "Ping Pong Summer may well feel rather familiar, but there is a lot of good-natured and very accessible fun to be had about its tale of one 13-year-old's dream of glory on the table tennis table." Chris Michael, in his review for The Guardian, said "It's gawky and awkward, but just like Rad's breakdancing worm, this one gets better as it goes along."

NPR was less positive, with reviewer Tomas Hachard calling the film "a sometimes intriguing experiment in upended expectations, though not a particularly successful one," that was largely lacking "coherent purpose". Calum Marsh of Film.com criticized Ping Pong Summer as "a cool ninety minutes of vapid 80s fetishism packaged to resemble a proper feature film" that was "resoundingly pointless". Jeannette Catsoulis of The New York Times focused criticism on the "limp hero" and "lifeless plot", arguing that the positive qualities of the film did not "excuse characters that are little more than props for embarrassing fashion or delivery systems for dated slang." Ann Hornaday at The Washington Post argued that "its relatively uninvolving story, starchily directed by Tully and given little zing by an uneven cast, makes 'Ping Pong Summer'" an "okay-not-great" film.
