= Don't Leave Home (film) =

- Film poster
- Directed by: Michael Tully
- Written by: Michael Tully
- Produced by: George M. Rush; Ryan Zacarias; Wally Hall; Jeffrey Allard; Tristan Orpan Lynch; Aoife O’Sullivan
- Starring: Anna Margaret Hollyman; Lalor Roddy; Helena Bereen; David McSavage; Karrie Cox
- Cinematography: Wyatt Garfield
- Edited by: Zach Clark
- Music by: Michael Montes
- Release date: March 2018 (SXSW)
- Running time: 86 minutes
- Country: United States
- Language: English

Don't Leave Home is a 2018 American horror mystery thriller film written and directed by Michael Tully and starring Anna Margaret Hollyman, Lalor Roddy, Helena Bereen, David McSavage and Karrie Cox.

== Cast ==
- Anna Margaret Hollyman as Melanie Thomas
- Lalor Roddy as Alastair Burke
- Helena Bereen as Shelly
- David McSavage as Padraig
- Karrie Cox as Wendy
- Alisha Weir as Siobhan Callahan
- Bobby Roddy as Young Alastair Burke
- Mark Lawrence as Connor Callahan
- Sue Walsh as Noreen Callahan

== Release ==
The film premiered at South by Southwest in March 2018.

== Reception ==
On the review aggregator website Rotten Tomatoes, 70% of 20 critics' reviews are positive.

Josh Kupecki of The Austin Chronicle awarded the film three and a half stars. Eric Kohn of IndieWire graded the film a B+. Jonathan Barkan of Dread Central awarded the film three and a half stars out of five. David Rooney of The Hollywood Reporter gave the film a positive review and wrote, “While this twisty tale of an ‘evil miracle’ connected to a self-exiled former priest ultimately withholds too much to resolve all of its enigmas, the atmospheric mood and persuasive performances keep you watching.” Brian Tallerico of RogerEbert.com gave the film a negative review and wrote, “As wonderful as it is to see a filmmaker with more uncommon inspirations than some of his peers, it’s equally disheartening when he falls short of them.”
