= Clouds Without Water =

Studio album by Zoar
- Released: 2003
- Genre: Instrumental rock
- Label: Middle Pillar Presents

Zoar chronology
In the Bloodlit Dark (2001)	Clouds Without Water (2001)

Clouds Without Water is the third album by the band Zoar. Unlike previous Zoar albums, this one contains songs with lyrics performed for the album. The album's title is derived from a collection of poetry by Aleister Crowley, entitled Clouds without Water.

== Track listing ==
1. "The Coming Anarchy"
2. "Our Way of Life"
3. "In Golden Light"
4. "Winter Wind"
5. "Ashes Falling"
6. "Clouds Without Water"
7. "In These Rooms"
8. "Behind the Lake"
9. "The Rain Begins"
10. "Wakeworld"
11. "Here the Deities Approve"

"Here The Deities Approve" lyrics: (High voice) Refrain: Here the Deities approve The God of Music and of Love; All the talents they have lent you, All the blessings they have sent you, Pleas'd to see what they bestow, Live and thrive so well below.
