= Walter Smetak =

Swiss-Brazilian musician and artist

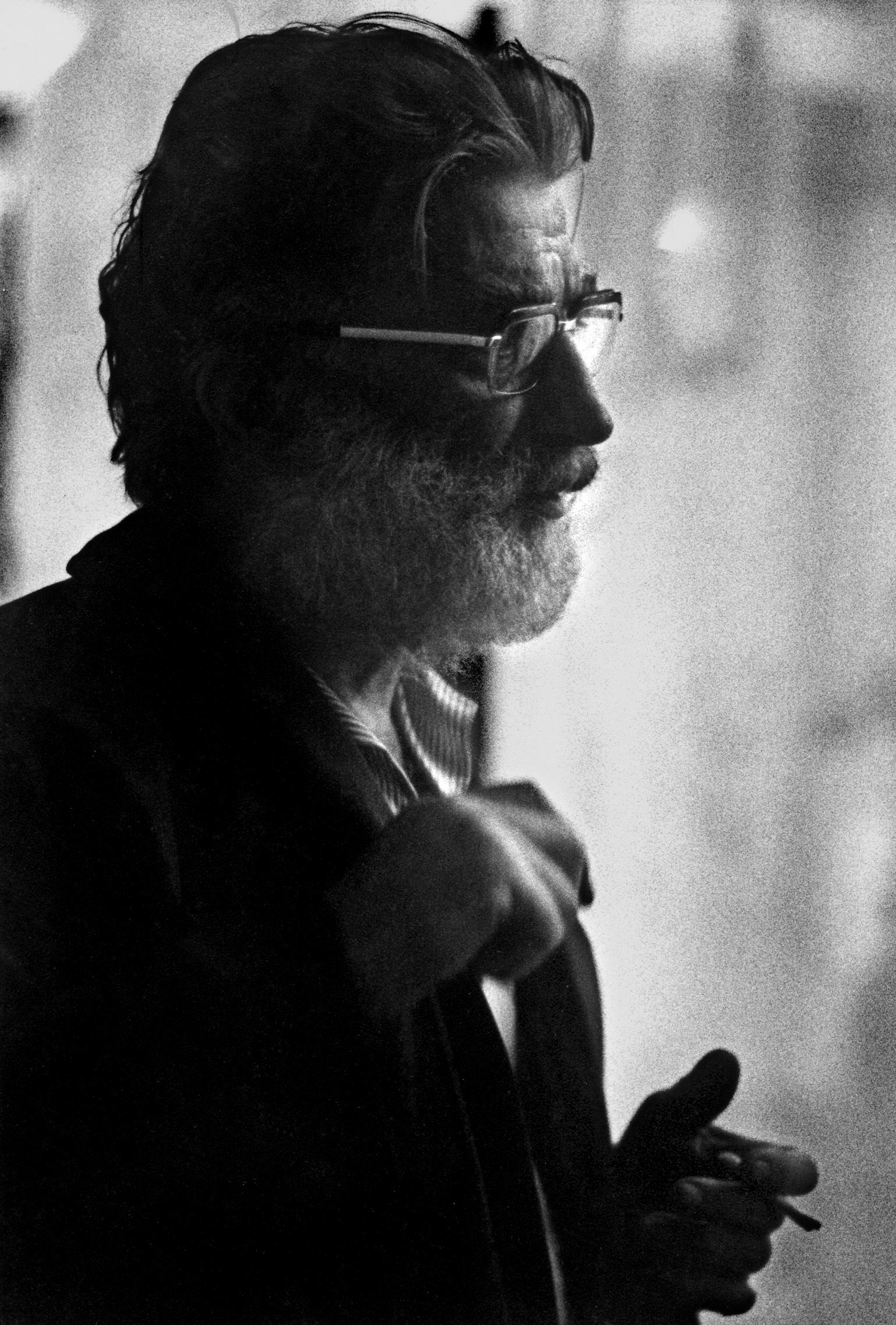
- Born: 13 February 1913; Zurich, Switzerland
- Died: 30 May 1984 (aged 71); Salvador, Brazil
- Notable work: Smetak (1974)

Anton Walter Smetak (Zurich, Switzerland, 13 February 1913 – Salvador, Brazil, 30 May 1984) was a Swiss-born musician, composer, writer, sculptor and producer of musical instruments.

== Life and works ==
Walter Smetak (1913–1984) was a Swiss-born Brazilian composer, cellist, instrument builder, and educator whose experimental sound sculptures and musical theories became influential in Brazil’s avant-garde music scene. Trained in Europe as a classical cellist, Smetak emigrated to Brazil in 1937 and later joined the Federal University of Bahia (UFBA) School of Music from 1957 to 1984, where he served as professor and developed over 120 hand-built instruments he called plásticas sonoras (“sound sculptures”).

He is considered a forerunner and early influence on the musicians and artists who would form the core of Tropicalia, such as Caetano Veloso, Gilberto Gil, Tom Zé and Torquato Neto. One of his best known works is the experimental album titled Smetak (1974), produced by Caetano Veloso and Roberto Santana and edited by Veloso and Gilberto Gil. Deeply involved in the Brazilian music scene of the 1960s and 1970s, Smetak collaborated with Gil, Tom Zé, Uakti and others. The group Uakti, one of the world's most important groups that employed original instruments, was strongly inspired by Smetak's teaching, since its founder Marco Antonio Guimarães was his pupil. He died in Salvador in 1984.

Smetak’s hybrid practice has been cited as a precursor to contemporary experimental lutherie and transdisciplinary art. His instruments remain on display in Salvador, Brazil, and continue to be studied by musicians and researchers.
