= Joseph Keckler =

American singer-songwriter

- Born: Kalamazoo, Michigan
- Occupations: Singer, Writer, Songwriter

Joseph Keckler is an American singer, musician, performing artist and writer. He writes and performs both absurdist operatic monologues and eerie, emotive ballads. He has also created videos and has authored numerous evening-length performance pieces. Keckler has been hailed as a "major vocal talent... with a trickster's dark humor" whose wide vocal range "shatters the conventional boundaries" by The New York Times, was once crowned "best downtown performance artist" in New York City by The Village Voice, and has been described as a subversive originator of "unnerving artistry" who "hardly seems human" in a 2019 review in The Observer.

Keckler is known for his voice, his carefully wrought stream-of-consciousness monologues, songwriting, and in particular for performing in a genre of his own design that fuses operatic vocals, storytelling, and contemporary subject matter. Deemed a "classic" by Indiewire, "Shroom Aria," for instance, is an autobiographical account of a hallucinogenic overdose, relayed as a 7-minute Italian opera. His musical performance have been presented by venues such as Lincoln Center, Adult Swim Festival, Center Pompidou, Museum of Contemporary Art Cincinnati, Third Man Records and others. His full-length performance pieces have been produced by Prototype Festival/Beth Morrison Projects, Opera Philadelphia and FringeArts and others.

In 2019 toured with the band Sleater-Kinney as national support act in The United States after premiering two performance pieces earlier in the year. Corin Tucker and Carrie Brownstein had seen him perform in LA, an experience that inspired their song "The Future is Here."

In 2017, Turtle Point Press published a collection of Keckler's writing, Dragon at the Edge of a Flat World. He had also written for Literary Hub, VICE, and Hyperallergic. In a conversation with Olivia Laing in BOMB magazine Keckler describes the book as being composed largely of portraits of eccentric individuals he has known.

In 2015, Keckler made his off-broadway debut in Dave Malloy's Preludes at the Lincoln Center Theater 3. He portrayed Feodor Chaliapin, a famous opera singer and long time friend to Sergei Rachmaninoff.
