= Uakti (myth) =

Uakti is a mythical musician described by the Tucano people of the Alto Rio Negro region of the Amazon. According to the legend, the creature had holes in his body such that they would produce sound when he ran or the wind blew through him. This music seduced the women of the tribe and so the other men burned and buried his body. The myth holds that out of Uakti's remains grew the palm trees from which the Tukanos' flutes are made. The women of the Tukano Indians are thus not allowed to play flutes.

The Brazilian instrumental group Uakti takes its name from this myth.

== See also ==
- Syrinx - a similar myth
