= Aguas da Amazonia =

1993–1999 composition by Philip Glass

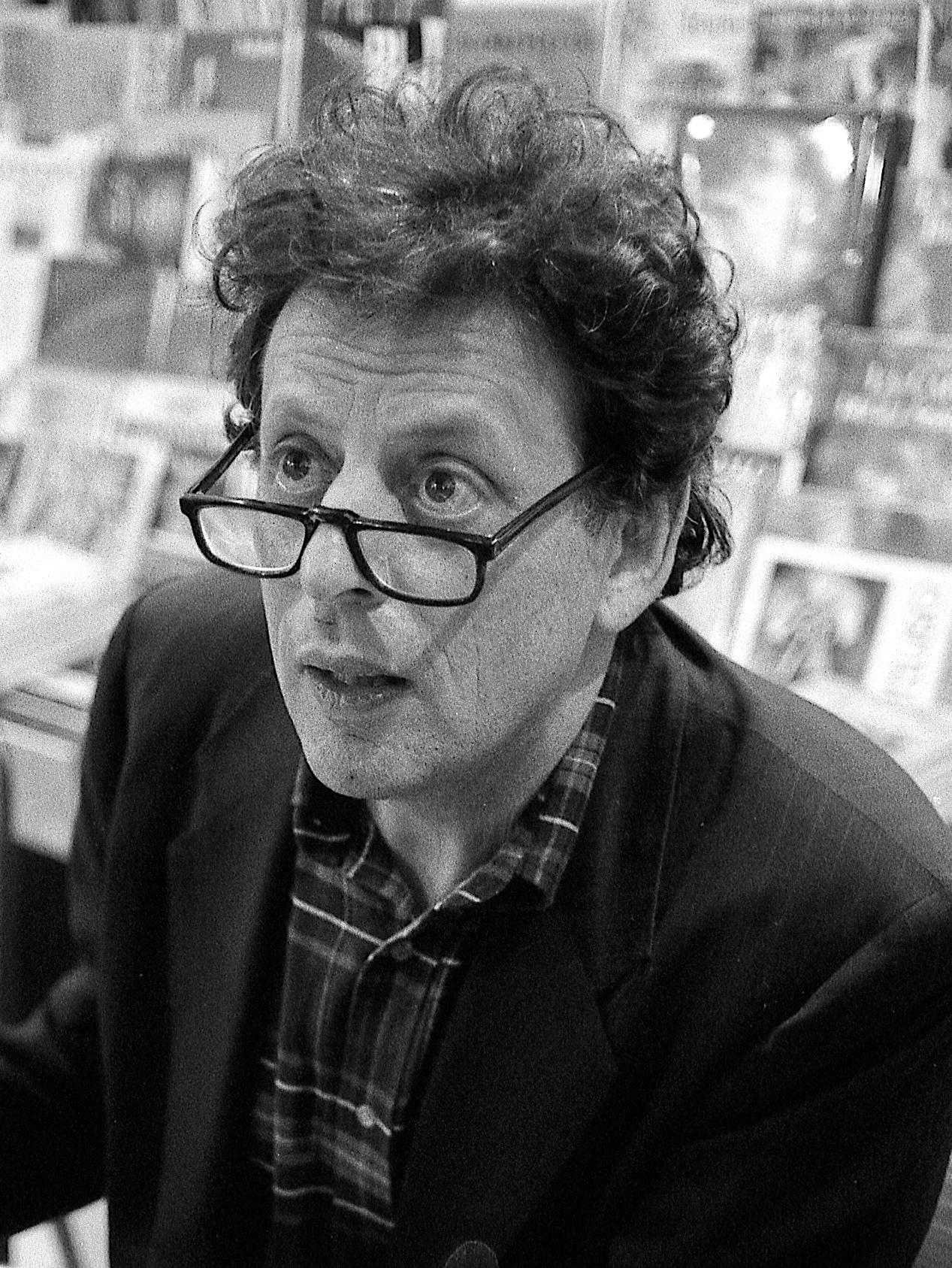
Philip Glass in 1993

Águas da Amazônia, Sete ou oito peças para um balé (Portuguese for 'Waters of the Amazon, seven or eight pieces for a ballet'), is a 1993–99 musical composition by the American contemporary classical composer Philip Glass. Its first recording was performed by the Brazilian instrumental group Uakti.

Originally composed as a dance score for a ballet company of Belo Horizonte (Grupo Corpo), following the introduction between Uakti and Philip Glass by Paul Simon, it draws inspiration from the Amazon waters with tones of classical, new age, and jazz music.

== Tracks ==
The track listing dedicates each song to one of the rivers:

1. Tiquiê River
2. Japurá River
3. Purus River
4. Negro River
5. Madeira River
6. Tapajós River
7. Paru River
8. Xingu River
9. Amazon River (version of Etude No. 2 Vol. 1 for piano)

A last title much in the same style but departing from this nomenclature is also part of the album:

1. Metamorphosis

== Performance history ==
Glass composed the music which the group performed under the artistic direction of, and with arrangements by, Marco Antônio Guimarães (also at the strings). This was the first time that Glass's music was arranged by another composer. Paulo Sérgio dos Santos and Décio de Souza Ramos Filho played the percussion instruments and Artur Andrés Ribeiro the woodwinds. Regina Stela Amaral and Michael Riesman complemented Uakti's performance of the work at the keyboard. Glass described the result as "a true melding of my music with their sensibilities."

In 2017, Charles Coleman released an orchestral arrangement of the work featuring the MDR Leipzig Radio Symphony Orchestra and Absolute Ensemble, conducted by Kristjan Jarvi.

In January 2025, the ensemble Third Coast Percussion released the album Aguas da Amazonia by Philip Glass through Rockwell Records, featuring flutist Constance Volk of Ensemble Dal Niente.
