= Mister Monster (band) =

American horror punk band

- Origin: New Jersey, United States
- Genres: Punk rock, horror punk
- Years active: 1998–2018
- Labels: Hell's Hundred Records
- Past members: J.V. Bastard, Robby Bloodshed, Paul Lifeless, Germs, Jimmy Skinz, Mars Rio, Carlos "Loki" Cofino, Argyle Goolsby, D.T. Graves, Emilio Menze, Gregory, Mike Pierce, Andrew "Stripes" Winter, J-Sin Trioxin

Mister Monster were an American, New Jersey–based horror punk band, started in 1998 by singer Jason "J-Sin" Trioxin (Jason Heveran), notable for their use of Doo Wop harmonies within Horror Punk, a style the band called Boo Wop. Mister Monster's influences included classic Doo Wop, The Stray Cats, The Damned, the Misfits, and the Ramones.

== History ==
The earliest compositions that would become Mister Monster songs were written by Trioxin in 1996-1997 while he served tenure in a different band. Since his songs: "Prom night", "Dead flesh girl" and "Little Frankenstein" were rejected by his bandmates, this served as the impetus for the creation of Mister Monster.

Mister Monster's first release was the album Songs From the Crypt, which was originally self-released. Subsequent to this CD the band was regularly playing sold-out performances in New Jersey and New York City. During the following year and a half, the band made small tours of the tri-State area and added changes to its lineup.

In 1999 to 2000, Trioxin recorded tracks for a five-song demo and recruited various friends to back him up at many New York City/New Jersey shows as Mister Monster and the Back Alley Butchers.

In late 2001 the band released the full-length disc Over Your Dead Body, which featured "This Night I Call (Bad Luck)", "Prom Night", "Scars 19", and "Resident Evil". The video for "Bad Luck", along with the video for "Gore Whore", can be found as bonus materials on the DVD for the horror film Creepy Tales: Girls' Night Out (Cinema Sky). The song appeared on the soundtrack along with some other tracks performed by the Misfits.

Mister Monster also appeared on compilations such as Grave Rockers and This Is Horrorpunk alongside the Nekromantix, The Cryptkeeper Five, The Independents, Blitzkid, The Spook, and Rock City Morgue.

Over Your Dead Body is available on Hell's Hundred Records.

The band was featured in the Activision Videogame "Vampire The Masquerade: Bloodlines" alongside Empire Hideous and Ghoultown. Having toured all over the United States, Mister Monster gained an international cult following.

In 2011, the original Mister Monster lineup composed of Trioxin, JV Bastard, Paul Lifeless and Germ was reunited for a concert celebrating the tenth anniversary of Over Your Dead Body

In between periods of Mister Monster activity, Jason Trioxin recorded with and/or performed as a touring member of Michale Graves' band, The Undead (as bassist), Wednesday 13, and Blitzkid. He played 55 dates as Michael Graves' guitarist on the Almost Home tour, which raised awareness of the plight of the West Memphis Three. Trioxin produced Blitzkid's Five Cellars Below LP, and on several occasions served as that band's touring guitarist.

On December 18, 2018, on Mister Monster's Facebook it was announced that Jason Trioxin had died on December 14, 2018.

== Discography ==
=== Albums ===
Year	Title	Label	Format	Other information
2001	Over Your Dead Body	Dismal/Abysmal Recordings	Digi Pack	
2004	Over Your Dead Body "Version 2"	Hell's Hundred Records	Compact disc	Alternate Edition.

=== EPs ===
Year	Title	Label	Other information
1998	Songs From the Crypt		
2000	Mister Monster		
2002	Skeleton Crew		
2005	Deep Dark		

=== Singles ===
Year	Title	Label	Format	Other information
2011	"Christmas"			

=== Splits ===
Year	Title	Label	Format	Other information
2003	Exhuming Graves and Making Dates		10"	Split with Blitzkid

=== Compilation albums ===
- 2007:Breaking Hearts and Eating Brains since '98
