= Middle Pillar Presents =

American record label

- Founded: 1998
- Founder: Kevin Dunn; James Babbo
- Distributors: Middle Pillar Distribution (U.S.); PHD Canada (Canada); Audioglobe Distribution (Europe); Nova Media (Germany)
- Genre: Ambient, dark wave, experimental, gothic
- Country of origin: U.S.
- Location: New York City
- Official website: www.middlepillar.com

Middle Pillar Presents is a New York-based record label that specializes in ambient, gothic, and experimental music. The label began as distributor for other labels and artists entitled Middle Pillar Distribution. Kevin Dunn and James Babbo established Middle Pillar Presents to showcase artists unable to get signed elsewhere. The British independent label 4AD served as an inspiration to the founding of Middle Pillar Presents. Middle Pillar Presents was established with the goal of releasing only "dark" music. In an effort to maintain musical continuity the sub-label Hell's Hundred Records was established to sign bands of other styles, such as "punk, gothic horror rock, [and] psychobilly."

== Roster ==
=== Middle Pillar Presents ===
- Aenima
- A Murder of Angels
- The Changelings
- Kobe
- Loretta's Doll
- Mirabilis
- The Mirror Reveals
- Sumerland
- Thread
- The Unquiet Void
- Zoar

=== Hell's Hundred Records ===
- The Brides
- The Empire Hideous
- Mister Monster
