= Zoar (band) =

- Origin: New York City, New York, United States
- Genres: Rock, gothic, ambient, classical, experimental
- Years active: 1995–present
- Labels: Dark Age Music
- Members: Michael Montes; Peter Rundquist; Erik Friedlander
- Website: www.zoar.com

Zoar is a primarily instrumental musical group from New York City. Michael Montes, a former medical student, formed Zoar in 1995 with Peter Rundquist, who formerly worked on Wall Street, and Erik Friedlander. Zoar's music is sometimes categorized as rock, but the band categorize themselves as Gothic, Ambient, Classical, and Experimental.

== Members ==
- Michael Montes (keyboard, primary composer)
- Peter Rundquist (guitar, co-composer)
- Erik Friedlander (cellist)

=== Guest musicians ===
Clouds Without Water

- Brendan Perry (of Dead Can Dance)
- Matt Johnson (of The The)
- Jennifer Charles (of Elysian Fields)
- Julie Comparini (vocalist who specializes in baroque and renaissance music)
- Tony Levin

== Discography ==
- Cassandra (1997)
- In the Bloodlit Dark (2001)
- Clouds Without Water (2003)
