= Cassandra (album) =

Studio album by Zoar
- Released: March 4, 1997
- Genre: Instrumental rock
- Label: PolyGram

Zoar chronology
Cassandra (1997)	In the Bloodlit Dark (2001)

Professional ratings
Review scores
Source	Rating
AllMusic	3/5 stars

Cassandra is the 1997 debut instrumental album from the band Zoar.

== Track listing ==
1. Cassandra (Part 1) – 6:26
2. Cassandra (Part 2) – 3:35
3. Cassandra (Part 3) – 6:31
4. The Passing of a Plague – 4:19
5. Death by Denial – 7:14
6. Nine Days North – 6:21
7. Ligeia – 2:26
8. If Only You Knew – 5:29
9. An Early Disobedience – 4:56
10. A Handful of Poison – 10:26
