= Uakti (band) =

Brazilian instrumental musical group

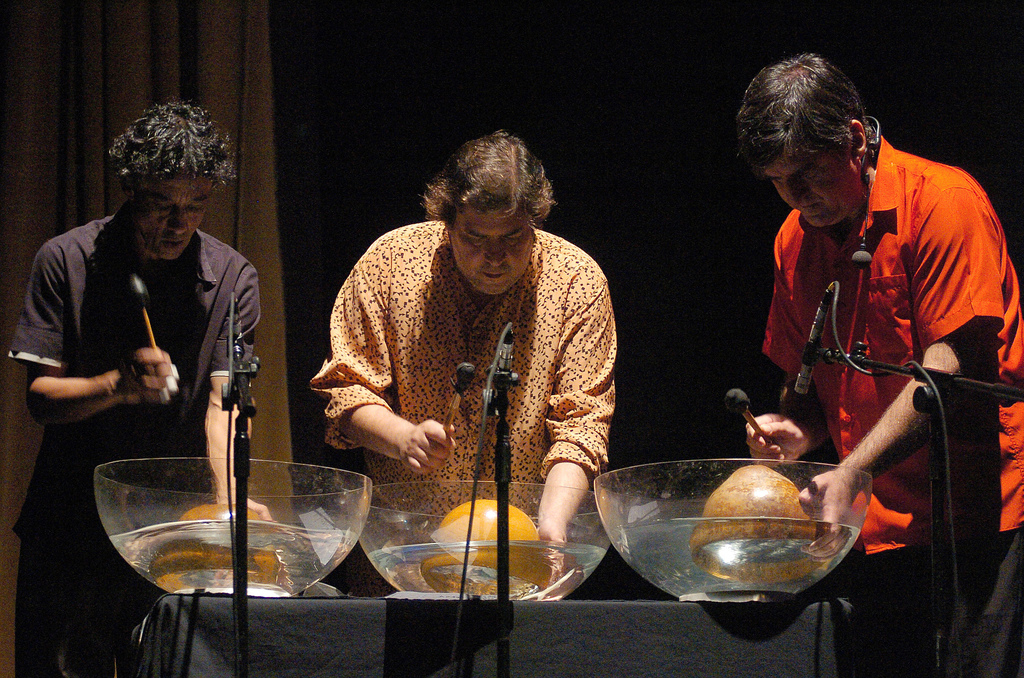
- Uakti performing at the Ibirapuera Auditorium in 2005

Background information
- Origin: Belo Horizonte, Minas Gerais, Brazil
- Genres: Minimalism, experimental
- Years active: 1978-2015
- Past members: Marco Antônio Guimarães; Artur Andrés Ribeiro; Paulo Sérgio Santos; Décio Ramos
- Website: uakti.com.br

Uakti (wahk-CHEE) was a Brazilian instrumental musical group that was composed of Marco Antônio Guimarães, Artur Andrés Ribeiro, Paulo Sérgio Santos, and Décio Ramos. Uakti was known for using custom-made instruments, built by the group itself.

== The name ==
The name of the group comes from a Tucano native South American legend. Uakti was a mythological being who lived on the banks of the Rio Negro. His body was full of holes, which, when the wind passed through them, produced sounds that bewitched the women of the tribe. The men hunted down Uakti and killed him. Palm trees sprouted up in the place where his body was buried, and the people used these to make flutes that made enchanting sounds like those produced by the body of Uakti.

== History ==
The group's leader, Marco Antônio Guimarães, studied music at the Universidade Federal da Bahia in Salvador. There he met and took classes with Walter Smetak, who passed on to him his passion for constructing musical instruments. In the years following his training, Marco Antônio played cello with the São Paulo and Minas Gerais symphony orchestras. During the same period he constructed, in the basement of his house, various instruments out of PVC, wood, and metal. In order to have musicians to play these instruments, in 1978 Guimarães had the idea of bringing together some of his colleagues from the Orquestra Sinfônica de Belo Horizonte, to meet at the Foundation for Artistic Education of Belo Horizonte. Various musicians took part; among them were the percussionists Paulo Sérgio Santos and Décio de Souza Ramos, the flutist Artur Andrés Ribeiro, and the cellist Cláudio Luz do Val. These musicians learned how to play the instruments, and the group Uakti was formed. Marco Antônio Guimarães became the principal composer and arranger, although all the participants frequently contributed their own compositions.

The group's first recording was of their participation in the soundtrack of the 1979 film Cabaré Mineiro. The score was composed by Tavinho Moura. Through Tavinho, Uakti made contact with musicians in the Clube da Esquina movement. In 1980 they played on Milton Nascimento's album Sentinela and made their first public performance at the museum in Pampulha. Their first album, Uakti - Oficina Instrumental, appeared the following year, as a consequence of the popularity they had acquired through their performances with Nascimento. With the departure of the cellist Cláudio Luz, the guitarist Bento Menezes joined the group, staying until 1984, when they recorded their third album, Tudo e Todas as Coisas. Starting with this album, they began to use traditional instruments less and less frequently.

In the period between 1981 and 1987 they established themselves in Brazil and took part in another recording by Milton Nascimento, Ânima. Their first international tour took place in Spain. In 1987 they took part in the album Brazil with the US jazz vocal group The Manhattan Transfer. During a show in the United States, singer and songwriter Paul Simon got to know their music, and invited them to play on his 1989 album The Rhythm of the Saints. During this recording, US composer Philip Glass, who was in Brazil, went to visit Simon and heard Uakti play. This resulted in a contract to record five albums with his Point Music label. The fifth album, MAPA, released in 1992, was a homage to the music of Marco Antonio Pena Araújo, a friend of the members of the group who had died in 1986 (the name MAPA is an acronym of the letters in his name).

The international recognition that the group gained resulted in much more work: Uakti travelled to Japan and various countries in Europe. Grupo Corpo, the acclaimed Minas Gerais dance theatre group, commissioned several original compositions by Marco Antônio Guimarães: A lenda, recorded on MAPA, Bach, which he released as a solo effort, and I Ching and 21 which became Uakti albums in 1994 and 1997, respectively.

In 1993 Philip Glass was also commissioned by Grupo Corpo to produce a composition for a ballet. Glass then chose Uakti to perform his composition, Águas da Amazônia - Sete ou oito peças para um balé. The arrangement was done by Marco Antônio Guimarães, who adapted the work to Uakti's instruments; this was the first time that Glass's music was arranged by another composer. The recording of this music was released in 1999, under the contract with Point Music. In 2004 Glass invited Uakti to collaborate again, this time on the Orion project. The city of Athens, as part of the 2004 pre-Olympic celebrations, commissioned Glass to do a series of open-air shows. Uakti took part, playing Glass's compositions.

In 1994 Uakti joined Stewart Copeland as he headlined an international tour, "Stewart Copeland and the Rhythmatists", in support of an album and video based on Stewart's experience in Africa. The tour roster featured Stewart Copeland performing with a diverse group of international musicians including: Les Percussions de Guinée, a leading drum group from Africa; Vinx, who recently toured with Sting; and Ray Lema, an original performer on the Rhythmatist album and video.

Starting in 1998, Uakti recorded fewer original compositions and concentrated on adaptations of classical music and of Brazilian popular songs. The soundtrack of the 1998 film Kenoma, by Eliana Caffé, used mostly compositions by Heitor Villa-Lobos. In 2000 they recorded an album of popular songs with the choral group Tabinha, from Minas Gerais. In 2002, they released the CD Clássicos, containing solely classical arrangements, and in 2005 they explored popular Brazilian themes in the CD Oiapok XUI, which, in addition to various popular Brazilian dance themes, contained four variations of Tom Jobim's Águas de Março.

Uakti frequently took part in projects with other artists. Besides the already-mentioned Milton Nascimento, Paul Simon and Manhattan Transfer, they worked with Ney Matogrosso, Maria Bethânia, and Zélia Duncan. They also performed in the show Dança das Marés, directed by Ivaldo Bertazzo, Ihú - Todos os Sons, which presented indigenous themes collected and adapted by Marlui Miranda. Their recording "Trilobita" was used in the closing credits of the Rush in Rio DVD.

== Instruments ==
The original instruments constructed by Marco Antônio Guimarães are responsible for the group's sound. The list below describes some of these instruments.

=== Pans ===
All of these follow the same basic principle: PVC tubes of various lengths, assembled so that their ends are aligned. The tubes are struck with a rubber mallet or with the hands. Since each length of tubing produces a different note, these instruments are tuned and can play melodies or chords. Currently, they are used in two sizes: the large pan of bent tubing that allows a larger length and is used as a bass, and the shorter inclined pan, used for principal melodies.

=== Marimbas ===
These are idiophones consisting of keys struck with mallets with heads made of rubber or felt. They are played like a xylophone or vibraphone. The difference between Uakti's marimbas and these instruments is that the keys are located above two independent sound boxes that can be inverted or moved. This allows the playing of chords or sequences that would be quite difficult using the traditional design. Uakti uses two kinds of marimbas:

- Marimba d'Angelim – made of wood used in everyday construction, or Angelim which gives it a rustic sound, since this wood possesses differences in density that produce a different timbre than normal xylophones.
- Glass marimba – the keys are made of glass, which produce notes of greater resonance than those made of wood.

=== String instruments with bows ===
Played by Marco Antônio Guimarães in recordings, they are, in general, inspired by the cello or the viol.

- Iarra - A type of cello, with two sets of strings that can be pressed simultaneously with the left hand. A bow is used to play the string.
- Chori Smetano - an instrument created by Walter Smetak. Basically it is a string instrument with a sound box for a head. According to its inventor, this instrument can simultaneously create opposing feelings, such as crying and laughing. This is the origin of the name "cho-ri" ("choro"="crying", "riso"="laughing" in Portuguese). Guimarães built his chori with the arm and bow length of the cello, so that any cellist can play it.
- Torre (Tower) - A large PVC tube with a double bass ridge at one end and a handle at the other. Strings are stretched along the sides of the tube. Two musicians are needed to play it. One turns the tube on its axis with the handle. The other uses a bow composed of two rods, and a horsehair viola bow to rub the strings. Since the bow can play several strings at once, it can play chords. Changing the velocity and quantity of notes with the bow gives rise to harmonic variations. It is one of the most astonishing instruments to see in live performances because of the rich harmonics produced and the unusual method of playing. It is normally used as a harmonic base.

=== Drums ===
The membranophones are also an important part of Uakti's sound, principally the trilobyte, formed out of 10 tuned PVC tubes arranged on a frame, with drum skins over the top ends. Two musicians position themselves facing each other, holding the instrument between them, and use their fingers, drum sticks, or the palms of their hands to strike the skins, producing quite rapid melodies.

=== Traditional instruments ===
The group also uses some traditional instruments. They use various types of drums such as atabaques and floor toms, and also tablas, traditional (Asian) Indian drums. Occasionally they use string instruments such as the violin or piano, though they usually play them using drum sticks and other alternative techniques.

Flutes, played by Artur Andrés Ribeiro, are possibly the traditional instruments most used by the group. They can also be played with a Chinese mouthpiece, a common flute mouthpiece with a membrane that vibrates with the passage of air (somewhat resembling a kazoo), making the flute sound something like a reed instrument.

== Discography ==
- Uakti - Oficina Instrumental (1981)
- Uakti 2 (1982)
- Tudo e Todas as Coisas (1984)
- Mapa (1989)
- I Ching (1993)
- 21 (1996)
- Trilobyte (1997)
- Águas da Amazônia (1999) (music by Philip Glass)
- Mulungu do Cerrado (2001) (with Tabinha)
- Clássicos (2003)
- Uakti (DVD, 2003)
- Oiapok Xui (2005)
- Blindness - Soundtrack (2008)
- Beatles (2012)
