= The Lost Tracks of Danzig =

Compilation album by Danzig
- Released: July 10, 2007
- Recorded: 1988–2004
- Genres: Heavy metal; hard rock
- Label: Megaforce
- Producers: Glenn Danzig, Rick Rubin

Danzig chronology
Circle of Snakes (2004)	The Lost Tracks of Danzig (2007)	Deth Red Sabaoth (2010)

Professional ratings
Review scores
Source	Rating
About.com	3.5/5 stars
AllMusic	2.5/5 stars
Billboard	(favorable)
Blistering	(favorable)
Goldmine	4/5 stars
Pitchfork	7/10 stars
Punknews.org	3/5 stars
Rock Hard	8/10 stars
Ultimate Guitar	8/10 stars

The Lost Tracks of Danzig is a compilation album of American heavy metal band Danzig. The set showcases a number of previously unreleased songs, ranging from the band's first recording sessions in 1987–88 until the sessions for their 2004 studio album, Circle of Snakes.

== Background ==
Glenn Danzig mentioned a compilation of unreleased songs in several interviews as early as 1990, prior to the release of Lucifuge. Due to his touring schedule and various other projects, the material that comprises The Lost Tracks of Danzig was set aside for a number of years, and was finally confirmed to be under preparation in the summer of 2006. He was only able to start work on the project after gaining back the rights to Danzig's unreleased material from American Recordings. Originally scheduled for release on May 29, 2007, it was delayed twice before its official release in North America on July 10, 2007, and in Europe one week earlier. The set was made available over iTunes in June 2007.

== Music and recording ==
Glenn Danzig has said in various interviews and in the compilation's liner notes that he does not consider these songs "throw-aways". It was often the case that these unreleased songs didn't fit the theme or concept of the album for which they were originally recorded. Danzig explained: "The songs that make it onto the final album [must] 'fit' or 'flow' together as a whole. Consequently, some tremendous Danzig songs have never been released, not because they weren't great, but because they didn't fit the overall vibe of the particular album, or for other reasons."

When Glenn Danzig began the Lost Tracks project, the songs were in various stages of completion - some were still in demo form, some had no vocals, and some needed a different mix or new instrument tracks. After tracking down and reviewing the original tapes, over thirty of which had to be baked before undergoing digital conversion due to their age, Danzig entered the studio and completed the tracks, finishing all vocal and instrumental recording himself. The project took nine months to complete.

The songs "Pain Is Like An Animal" and "When Death Had No Name" were written toward the tail end of Glenn Danzig's tenure in Samhain. In the liner notes Glenn Danzig says "Pain Is Like An Animal" was "originally a Samhain song that became one of the first Danzig tracks".

The album includes "White Devil Rise", recorded during the sessions for Danzig 4 in response to racist comments by Louis Farrakhan and his use of the term "The White Devil" to describe the white race. Danzig has explained that the song is his conjecture as to what would happen if Farrakhan incited the passive white race to rise up and start a race war: "No one wants to see a race war. It would be terrible, so the song's saying, 'Be careful what you wish for.'"

Glenn Danzig spoke fondly of the track "Satan's Crucifiction", describing it as one of his favorite songs on the set. According to Danzig, the song was written to anger American Recordings, the band's label at the time. Eerie Von explained it had also been played during rehearsals to scare off unwelcome executives from the label who might happen upon the band's recording sessions. The song title is misspelled "Crucifiction", perhaps intentionally as a pun. The song was performed live for the first time in the fall of 2007, and was a regular in the Danzig set-list during the fall 2008 'Blackest of the Black' tour.

The 1992 version of "When Death Had No Name", recorded during the How the Gods Kill sessions and originally available as a B-side on the 1992 "Dirty Black Summer" single, is one of three tracks on the set to have been previously released. "Deep", originally recorded and intended for Danzig 5: Blackacidevil, was available on Songs in the Key of X, the soundtrack to The X-Files television series. The mix used on the X-Files soundtrack differs very slightly in its final second of audio, ending abruptly rather than with a brief echo as on Lost Tracks. The remix "Underbelly of the Beast" previously appeared on the soundtrack to The Crow: Salvation in 2000.

"Unspeakable" (Shango Mix) was not officially released prior to the Lost Tracks, though it did appear as looped background music in the 2006 Grub Girl pornographic movie. Other songs were previously released in a different form. The original version of "Come to Silver" can be found on Blackacidevil. The original versions of "Unspeakable" and "Belly of the Beast" were released on the 1999 album 6:66 Satan's Child.

== Artwork and packaging ==
The Lost Tracks of Danzig is packaged as a two disc digipak. Two versions of the cover exist; one with "Danzig" in the more recognized font and the other in a retro-sixties type font. The album cover is by artist Simon Bisley. The set contains a booklet that explains the history of each song along with vintage band photos. The booklet front cover is by artist Joe Chiodo.

== Reception ==
- Blistering - "The Lost Tracks of Danzig is a diverse collection covering practically every facet of his expansive career. It comes across as a true retrospective rather than simply a bunch of unfinished songs. An essential addition to any fan's collection, regardless of whichever Danzig era is your favorite."
- Ultimate Guitar - "It’s full of the band’s classic evil blues sound, and doesn't really veer off that path...Between the chugging, down-tuned guitar and the smooth delivery from Glenn Danzig, there is plenty to satisfy anyone who has been a fan of the band."
- Billboard - "The Lost Tracks of Danzig is a dark holy grail for followers of the lone wolf icon...The set works well as a history lesson, although its dirge-and-dreary atmospheres make the double album extremely linear."
- About.com - "The Lost Tracks of Danzig is aimed mainly at hardcore fans of the band, and those fans will love this CD. There are also enough quality songs that casual Danzig fans should enjoy it as well."

== Music videos ==
A music video was released for the song "Crawl Across Your Killing Floor". The video is shot in black and white, and is inspired by the opening of the 1966 Spaghetti Western film Django.

== Track listing ==
=== Disc 1 ===
1. "Pain Is Like an Animal" 3:43
2. "When Death Had No Name" 5:31
3. "Angel of the 7th Dawn" 4:37
4. "You Should Be Dying" 4:20
5. "Cold, Cold Rain" 4:30
6. "Buick McKane" 4:20
7. "When Death Had No Name" 5:19
8. "Satan's Crucifiction" 3:44
9. "The Mandrake's Cry" 3:18
10. "White Devil Rise" 4:45
11. "Come to Silver" (acoustic) 3:21
12. "Deep" 3:49
13. "Warlok" 4:03

=== Disc 2 ===
1. "Lick the Blood Off My Hands" 4:36
2. "Crawl Across Your Killing Floor" 6:50
3. "I Know Your Lie" 3:45
4. "Caught in My Eye" 4:14
5. "Cat People" 5:28
6. "Bound by Blood" 5:26
7. "Who Claims the Soulless" 3:35
8. "Malefical" 4:51
9. "Soul Eater" 3:43
10. "Dying Seraph" 5:22
11. "Lady Lucifera" 3:49
12. "Under Belly of the Beast" 4:06
13. "Unspeakable (Shango Mix)" 3:55

All songs written by Glenn Danzig, except "Buick McKane" by T. Rex, "Caught in My Eye" by the Germs and "Cat People" by David Bowie.

== Recording Sessions ==
Danzig (1988)

- Pain is Like an Animal
- When Death Had No Name (version 1)

Danzig II: Lucifuge (1990)

- Angel of the Seventh Dawn
- You Should Be Dying
- Cold, Cold Rain

Danzig III: How the Gods Kill (1992)

- When Death Had No Name (version 2)
- Buick McKane
- Satan's Crucifiction
- The Mandrake's Cry

Danzig 4 (1994)

- White Devil Rise

Danzig 5: blackacidevil (1996)

- Deep (alternate take)
- Come to Silver (acoustic)
- Warlock
- Lick the Blood off My Hands

Danzig 6:66 Satan’s Child (1999)

- Crawl Across Your Killing Floor
- I Know Your Lie
- Caught in My Eye
- Under Belly of the Beast (remix)
- Unspeakable (Shango Mix)

Danzig 777: I, Luciferi (2002)

- Cat People
- Bound by Blood
- Who Claims the Soulless
- Malefical
- Soul Eater
- Dying Seraph

Danzig: Circle of Snakes (2004)

- Lady Lucifera

== Exclusions ==
The following tracks either are not included on the set, were released with different titles, or never existed.

=== Pre-Danzig recordings ===
- (Title unknown)

This song is commonly bootlegged as "Night of Hate" or "Die for the Demon" and was recorded on a band rehearsal cassette. Former bassist Eerie Von has said this song was more of a jam session idea that never progressed further.

- "You and Me (Less than Zero)"

This track, credited on the soundtrack of the film Less than Zero to Glenn Danzig and the Power and Fury Orchestra, is essentially the earliest released Danzig track. Bassist Eerie Von did not like how Rick Rubin instructed him to play bass for the song, so the duties were handed over to longtime Rubin associate George Drakoukias. Danzig has said in interviews this track was meant for a female vocalist; he only reluctantly performed for the final version because the record's producers liked his vocals on the demo he had provided them.

- "Twist of Cain", "Am I Demon", "Soul on Fire", "Possession", "When Death Had No Name" and "Descent"

Rehearsal demos exist for these tracks and circulate on bootlegs. A finished version of "Descent" was later released on the Samhain album Final Descent. The remaining songs were later recorded for the debut album. Several of these early versions feature different arrangements and lyrics.

=== From the recording sessions of Danzig ===
- "I'm the One" (Full band version)

Danzig noted in the December 2006 issue of Revolver Magazine that this recording was never given to him by Rick Rubin and will not be featured on the set.

- "Trouble" (Elvis Presley cover)

This recording of the song from the Danzig sessions is not on the set and remains unreleased. The song was recorded at every session up until its release on Thrall-Demonsweatlive.

- "Pain Is Such a Lovin' Thing"

On the "Danzig hotline" then-Danzig bassist Eerie Von ran during the 1990s, Von played a clip of an unreleased song. When later asked its title, he called it "Pain Is Such a Lovin' Thing". This is the chorus of the song, rather than the correct title upon its 2007 'Lost Tracks' release: "Pain Is Like an Animal". In the summer of 2008, Eerie Von stated that the version included in the 'Lost Tracks' set was actually recorded in either 1991 or 1992, during the sessions for How the Gods Kill. Taken together with Danzig's comments in the album liner notes it is possible that there may be at least one unreleased, earlier recording of the song from 1987 or 1988, though this has not been confirmed.

=== From the recording sessions of Danzig II: Lucifuge ===
- "The Other Side"

This song was first mentioned in a 1990 issue of Hit Parader magazine as a "completed" song in its own right. Former bassist Eerie Von is nonetheless said to have confirmed this song was reworked into "Killer Wolf" for its release on Lucifuge later that year.

- "Trouble" (Elvis Presley cover)

This recording of the song from the Lucifuge sessions is not on the set and remains unreleased.

- "When Death Had No Name"

This recording of the song from the Lucifuge sessions is not on the set and remains unreleased.

- "Death... In Its Arms"

This song, while intended for Samhain and released on the final Samhain LP, Final Descent, was in fact recorded during the Lucifuge sessions by the Danzig lineup at the time.

=== From the recording sessions of Danzig III: How the Gods Kill ===
- "Love and Pain"

This song was retitled "Pain Is Like An Animal".

- "Trouble" (Elvis Presley cover)

This recording of the song from the How the Gods Kill sessions is not on the set and remains unreleased.

- "Livin' Doll"

This song was later retitled and recorded as "Left Hand Black".

=== From the recording sessions of Danzig 4p ===
- "Crucifixion Destruction"

In the August 1994 issue of Musician Magazine, "Crucifixion Destruction" was mentioned as a song completed for the upcoming fourth Danzig album. When asked about the matter years later, Danzig himself denied any song called "Crucifixion Destruction" existed. The contradiction likely arose because the correct title for the song is "Satan's Crucifiction". In a 2007 interview for the7thhouse.com, Eerie Von mentioned the band had played a "better, faster" version of the song during the 1994 sessions, but had recorded only the slower tempo version released on the 'Lost Tracks' set.

=== From the recording sessions of Blackacidevil ===
- "Don't Be Afraid"

Originally released on the "Sacrifice" single, this was later included as a bonus track on the 2000 E-Magine reissue of Blackacidevil.

- "White Devil Rise"

This recording of the song from the Blackacidevil sessions is not on the set and remains unreleased. According to Glenn Danzig's liner notes for The Lost Tracks of Danzig, that version remains incomplete. The recording featured on this compilation is taken from the Danzig 4 sessions.

=== From the recording sessions of Bleedangel EP ===
- "Bleedangel"

This song, which was to be the title track for the scrapped Bleedangel EP, was later included as a bonus track on the 2000 E-Magine reissue of Blackacidevil.

- "Bloodfeast" (Misfits cover)

According to former Danzig bassist Josh Lazie, this song and one or more Misfits songs were recorded at this session. Glenn Danzig has denied this. No such recording is on the set, and it remains to be seen if these recordings actually exist.

- "Five Finger Crawl"

An early version, this would go on to be re-recorded and released on 6:66 Satan's Child

=== From the recording sessions of 6:66 Satan's Child ===
- "Bleedangel"

This recording of "Bleedangel" remains unreleased.

- "Kill March"

This song was reportedly re-worked and re-recorded as "Halo Goddess Bone" for I Luciferi.

- "Lies"

While the Misfits Central 'Danzig Recording Sessions' guide lists them as two separate songs, this song may actually be "I Know Your Lie". If this is not the case, this song was either retitled or remains unreleased.

- "Zodiac Summer"

This song was either retitled or remains unreleased.

=== From the recording sessions of 777: I Luciferi ===
- "Malefical Bride of Hell"

This song was later retitled "Malefical".

- "Dark Secret Side"

This song, reported in December 2001 as the tenth in a tentative track listing for the album that eventually became I Luciferi, was either retitled or remains unreleased.

== Charts ==
Chart (2007)	Peak position
US Billboard 200	164
US Independent Albums (Billboard)	21
