= Live on the Black Hand Side =

Live album by Danzig
- Released: May 8, 2001
- Recorded: 1992, 1994, 2000
- Genre: Heavy metal
- Length: 124:50
- Label: Evilive / Restless
- Producer: Glenn Danzig

Danzig chronology
Danzig 6:66: Satan's Child (1999)	Live on the Black Hand Side (2001)	Danzig 777: I Luciferi (2002)

Professional ratings
Review scores
Source	Rating
AllMusic	2/5 stars

Live on the Black Hand Side is a double-disc live album by American heavy metal band Danzig. It was recorded at various shows between 1992 and 2000 (including Danzig's infamous Halloween '92 show at Irvine Meadows, CA), and was released in 2001 on Glenn Danzig's Evilive Records label, distributed by Restless Records. It is the first official, full-length live album from the band, however, the 1993 EP, Thrall-Demonsweatlive and select CD singles have featured live material. In fact, Thrall-Demonsweatlive, includes four additional live tracks from the Halloween '92 show that are not included on this release.

The original, studio version of the song "Halloween II" was recorded by Glenn Danzig's first band, the Misfits.

== Track listing ==
=== Disc 1 ===
1. "Godless" 5:57
2. "Left Hand Black" 4:11
3. "How the Gods Kill" 6:14
4. "Dirty Black Summer" 3:55
5. "Pain in the World" 5:27
6. "Evil Thing" 3:16
7. "Halloween II" 3:21
8. "Not of This World" 4:31
9. "Killer Wolf" 3:48
10. "Little Whip" 5:11
11. "Going Down to Die" 4:30
12. "Bringer of Death" 6:42
13. "Stalker Song" 5:36
14. "Long Way Back from Hell" 4:44

=== Disc 2 ===
1. "Satan's Child" 2:45
2. "7th House" 3:44
3. "5 Finger Crawl" 3:25
4. "Unspeakable" 3:39
5. "Lilin" 5:37
6. "Her Black Wings" 4:49
7. "It's Coming Down" 3:23
8. "Do You Wear the Mark" 4:43
9. "Until You Call on the Dark" 3:42
10. "Deep" 4:00
11. "Belly of the Beast" 4:09
12. "She Rides" 5:31
13. "Twist of Cain" 4:02
14. "Mother" 3:58

== Credits ==
- Glenn Danzig: lead vocals
- Chuck Biscuits: drums (disc 1, tracks 1–8)
- Joey Castillo: drums (disc 1, tracks 9–14; disc 2)
- John Christ: guitar (disc 1)
- Howie Pyro: bass (disc 2)
- Eerie Von: bass (disc 1)
- Todd Youth: guitar (disc 2)

== Recording ==
=== Disc 1 ===
- Tracks 1–8: October 31, 1992 at the Irvine Meadows Amphitheater, Irvine, California
- Tracks 9–14: December 19, 1994 at the Center Arena, Seattle, Washington

=== Disc 2 ===
- Tracks 1–?: May 9, 2000 at Royal Grove; Lincoln, Nebraska
- Tracks ?–?: May 13, 2000 at the Warfield Theater, San Francisco, California
- Tracks ?–14: May 14, 2000 at the Sun Theater, Anaheim, California
