= Black Aria =

Studio album by Glenn Danzig
- Released: 1992, 2000, 2006
- Recorded: 1987–?
- Genres: Neoclassical dark wave; dungeon synth
- Length: 23:48
- Labels: Plan 9, E-Magine, Evilive
- Producer: Glenn Danzig

Glenn Danzig chronology
Danzig III: How the Gods Kill (1992)	Black Aria (1992)	Thrall-Demonsweatlive (1993)

Professional ratings
Review scores
Source	Rating
AllMusic	1.5/5 stars
Leviatan Magazine	(6.9/10)

Black Aria is an instrumental album composed by Glenn Danzig, the frontman of Danzig and previously of Samhain and the Misfits. His first album as a solo artist, it was released in 1992.

The mostly instrumental album is a departure from Danzig's earlier work in metal and punk rock, and debuted at number 1 on the American Billboard classical chart. The original release was on Glenn Danzig's own label, Plan 9 Records, and like his Misfits and Samhain releases, was distributed by Caroline Records. The album was reissued in 2000 on E-Magine Records, and a sequel followed on Evilive Records in 2006. A third reissue occurred, again on Danzig's Evilive label in conjunction with Cleopatra Records, in July 2023, along with Black Aria II.

== Music and recording ==
The album is largely modern instrumental classical music, and is very dark, with gothic metal tendencies.

Although it was not released until 1992, some of the material on the album was recorded as early as 1987. Select tracks from the album had served as intro music to early Danzig shows, and excerpts of some songs were included on Danzig's first two compilation home videos released by Def American Recordings in 1989 and 1991.

The first six-song titles reference a soundtrack to John Milton's epic poem Paradise Lost, which describes Lucifer's rebellion from the Christian God, and his subsequent expulsion from Heaven with the angels who joined him. The final three tracks, written by Danzig while he was still in Samhain, reference Celtic mythology. "The Morrigu" relates to The Morrígan, a mythical phantom queen. "Cwn Annwn" refers to the spectral hounds of the same name.

All tracks were written by Glenn Danzig, who also performed all instruments. Engineering was provided by Nick Didia, Martin Schmelze, and Bob Alecca. Female voices were provided by Janna Brown and Reneé Rubach.

== Artwork and packaging ==
The photograph of Glenn Danzig in the liner notes was taken by Anton Corbijn. The album's front cover is by renowned comic book and graphic artist Michael William Kaluta, who also drew the interior illustrations for Danzig's fourth album.

As the musical content of Black Aria is a departure from the music of the band Danzig, the album has a written disclaimer to warn buyers that it is not a rock record.

== Track listing ==
All music is composed by Glenn Danzig.

No.	Title	Length
1.	"Overture of the Rebel Angels"	2:42
2.	"Conspiracy Dirge"	1:59
3.	"Battle for Heaven"	3:54
4.	"Retreat and Descent"	3:53
5.	"Dirge of Defeat"	1:48
6.	"And the Angels Weep"	1:18
7.	"Shifter"	1:33
8.	"The Morrigu"	4:25
9.	"Cwn Anwnn"	2:13
Total length:		23:45

== Credits ==
- Glenn Danzig – all instruments
- Janna Brown – female vocals
- Reneé Rubach – female vocals

=== Production ===
- Nick Didia – engineering (tracks 1–7)
- Martin Schmelze – engineering (tracks 1–7)
- Bob Alecca – engineering (tracks 8–9)
