= Sacrifice (EP) =

EP by Danzig
- Released: December 17, 1996
- Recorded: 1996
- Genres: Heavy metal, industrial metal
- Length: 50:03 (reissue)
- Labels: Hollywood Records (original); E-Magine Music (reissue)
- Producer: Glenn Danzig

Danzig chronology
Blackacidevil (1996)	Sacrifice (1996)	6:66 Satan's Child (1999)

Professional ratings
Review scores
Source	Rating
AllMusic	2.5/5 stars

Sacrifice is the second EP by American heavy metal band Danzig. It was released in 1996 on Hollywood Records and reissued in 2000 on Evilive Records/E-Magine Records.

== Critical reception ==
Exclaim! wrote that "the Sacrifice EP should only be of interest to rabid fans, an extension only for to [sic] those who understood [Danzig's] ultra-techno-dabbling."

== Track listing ==
1996 Hollywood Records version

1. "Sacrifice" - 4:28
2. "Blackacidevil" - 4:24
3. "Don't Be Afraid" - 4:27

1996 original version

1. "Sacrifice (Rust Mix)" - 3:46
2. "Sacrifice (Trust Mix)" - 3:46
3. "Sacrifice (Must Mix)" - 6:26
4. "Sacrifice (Crust Mix)" - 6:28
5. "Sacrifice (Martyr Mix)" - 6:20
6. "Sacrifice (Album Version)" - 4:28

2000 reissue version

1. "Sacrifice (Rust Mix)" - 3:46
2. "Sacrifice (Trust Mix)" - 3:46
3. "Sacrifice (Must Mix)" - 6:26
4. "Sacrifice (Crust Mix)" - 6:28
5. "Sacrifice (Martyr Mix)" - 6:20
6. "Sacrifice (Album Version)" - 4:28
7. "Deepest (Kennedy Acid Death Mix)" - 4:54
8. "Deeper Still (French Eric Cadieaux Techno Mix)" - 6:50
9. "Serpentia (Winter Mix)" - 7:01

All songs written by Glenn Danzig.

== Production ==
- Tracks 1–4 perpetrated by JG Thirlwell, engineered by Rob Sutton.
- Tracks 5 and 9 remixed by Joseph Bishara.
- Track 6 produced by Glenn Danzig, engineered and mixed by Bill Kennedy.
- Track 7 remixed by Bill Kennedy.
- Track 8 remixed by "French Eric" Cadieaux.
