= Blackacidevil =

- Long-box special edition cover issued in 1996

Studio album by Danzig
- Released: October 29, 1996
- Recorded: August 24, 1995 – September 1996
- Studios: A&M Recording Studios, Los Angeles
- Genre: Industrial metal
- Length: 45:09 (1996); 58:06 (2000)
- Labels: Hollywood Records (original); E-Magine Music (reissue); The End Records (2nd reissue)
- Producer: Glenn Danzig

Danzig chronology
Danzig 4 (1994)	Blackacidevil (1996)	Danzig 6:66: Satan's Child (1999)

Alternative cover
- Evilive Records/E-Magine Music reissue, February 2000

Singles from Blackacidevil
- 1. "7th House" Released: 1996; 2. "Sacrifice" Released: October 15, 1996; 3. "Serpentia" Released: 1997

Danzig 5: Blackacidevil is the fifth studio album by American heavy metal band Danzig. It was released in 1996 on Hollywood Records, and was reissued through E-Magine Records in 2000 with three extra tracks. The album sees the band shift to a largely industrial-based sound.

== Background ==
The album is the first recorded by Danzig after its departure from producer Rick Rubin's record label, American Recordings. It is also the first album recorded after the demise of the "classic" lineup featuring John Christ, Eerie Von, and Chuck Biscuits. Only the band's leader Glenn Danzig remained, backed by drummer Joey Castillo, who had joined the band in 1994 immediately after the departure of Chuck Biscuits, after having started as his drum tech, and session bassist Josh Lazie, who had previously toured with Danzig as Eerie Von's bass tech. Guitarist Tommy Victor joined the band shortly after Blackacidevil's completion.

== Music and recording ==
On Blackacidevil, the band's sound shifted from doomy and gothic heavy metal to experimental industrial rock/metal. Glenn Danzig explained: "I wanted to do something that nobody else was really doing. So I took an element of industrial that I liked here, and an element of techno there, then mixed it with what I normally do. I took the best elements of stuff. They're powerful when used properly. Then, I'd still experiment with different directions, which I wanted to do anyway, and then watch what happened when I mixed it together." On several tracks Danzig applied distortion effects to his vocals.

Jerry Cantrell of Alice in Chains plays guitar on the tracks "See All You Were", "Hand of Doom" and "Come to Silver". This was the first Danzig album to feature Joey Castillo and Josh Lazie, and the only album to feature contributions by Mark Chaussee and Joseph Bishara. Glenn Danzig plays all the instruments on the remainder of the album.

Joseph Bishara described the production of the album: "The way we did it was different from the way records get done, not even taking the time to print time-code and lock-up and do stuff we need to get a programmed kick drum in. A lot of that is me literally playing kick drum in. Now you're punching in programming that you're playing live. It was a very raw and punk rock way to do electronic."

Opening song "7th House" is about the theme of "sex and death". Glenn Danzig recorded his vocal track for the song in a single take.

"Hand of Doom" is a cover of the Black Sabbath song, with new lyrics and musical arrangements by Glenn Danzig. Danzig explained his changes to the original version: "I didn't want people to think it's just a cover...I started improvising and twisted the words. The melody is still the same, with an industrial kind of groove to the beginning and then the chorus comes in and it's full on crazy, with the screaming vocals." The idea for recording a cover version of the song came during a soundcheck by then-Danzig guitarist John Christ.

Glenn Danzig had originally written "Come to Silver" for Johnny Cash during the recording of Danzig 4, although it was never recorded by Cash due to Danzig's split from American Recordings. The song addresses the evils of the almighty dollar.

"Sacrifice" was the album's first single. According to Glenn Danzig, the song is about "sacrificing yourself throughout your life. It's about giving a little more than you should be giving. It's not about ritual sacrifice...it's more about killing yourself, little by little." Several different versions of the song, remixed by J. G. Thirlwell, appear on the 1996 Sacrifice EP, along with remixes of "Serpentia" and "Deep".

According to Glenn Danzig, the lyrics to "See All You Were" are "about a love that's over....some of it's drawn on [personal experience]." The song "Hint of Her Blood" is "about a girl who can only get off when she sees blood, and I didn't say her own, either". "Serpentia" tells of "someone getting into really wild sex for the first time". The closing track "Ashes" has also been discussed by Glenn Danzig: "It's not a depressing song, it's a melancholy song. It's happy depression, sad and happy at the same time. I don't like to say it's romantic but it is, everyone has different sides to their personality."

The song "Deep", which had been released earlier that year on The X-Files television soundtrack, was set to be featured on the album. However, because of Danzig's 1996 departure from American Recordings, the song could not be included. Another version of the same song titled "Deeper", with additional guitar by Tommy Victor, was recorded for the unreleased Bleedangel EP, and included as one of three bonus tracks on the 2000 Blackacidevil reissue. Of the remaining bonus tracks, "Bleedangel" was recorded as the title track for the unreleased EP, whereas "Don't Be Afraid" was recorded during the original Blackacidevil sessions and first appeared as a B-side on the "Sacrifice" single.

== Album title ==
Danzig has not publicly explained the meaning of the album's title. Various theories have been advanced, including it being a play on the phrase "black as a devil", with the words "black acid devil" (or black acid evil) run together in a portmanteau. Tickets for Danzig's Halloween 1996 special $6.66 show at Detroit's State Theatre and Halloween 1997 special $6.66 show at West Hollywood's Whisky A Go Go had the phrase "Black Acid Devil" printed on them.

== Artwork and packaging ==
The liner notes feature artwork by Joseph Cultice. The re-released version of the album features a new cover by Martin Emond.

Through Danzig's new distribution deal with Cleopatra Records, the album was reissued a third time in October 2021 under Danzig's Evilive imprint; in a limited edition of 10,000 CD copies with new artwork and an embossed black slipcase. However, the actual CD enclosed in these copies was actually leftover "new old stock" copies of the original 1996 Hollywood Records pressing.

== Music videos ==
Music videos were released for the songs "Sacrifice" and "Serpentia". All music videos from the album are featured on Danzig's Il Demonio Nera DVD.

== Reception and controversy ==
Professional ratings
Review scores
Source	Rating
AllMusic	2.5/5 stars
College Music Journal	(favorable)
Guitar World	2/5 stars
Rock Hard	4.5/10 stars

Blackacidevil was widely criticized for its apparent shift in musical direction and was not well received by most critics. Glenn Danzig discussed Blackacidevil's reception: "That album worked exactly the way I wanted it to, basically, it shook a lot of stuff up. People either loved it or hated it, and we got a lot of new fans from its release. Hey, maybe some of the people who only liked 'Mother' dropped out, and I've always said those fans are okay, when you get this big MTV exposure, but they're not permanent fans. The core following you have is your most important thing."

Besides the changes in musical direction, Blackacidevil's original release caused more controversy: Danzig's violent music and use of Satanic imagery conflicted with the corporate image projected by Disney, the parent company of Danzig's new record label, Hollywood Records. Tower Records' Pulse! magazine created a mock radio advertisement and a cartoon drawing spoofing this odd relationship. The cartoon featured Glenn Danzig shaking hands with Disney CEO Michael Eisner at the entrance to "Danzigland" (instead of Disneyland) with the two surrounded by skulls, a child wearing a "666" T-shirt and a horned and fanged Mickey Mouse. As a result of the controversy, the label pulled support for the album and the record deal was severed. Blackacidevil was the only Danzig release on the Hollywood Records label. The master rights reverted to Danzig soon afterward, laying the groundwork for a 2000 reissue on E-Magine, and a later 2021 limited edition reissue (which was actually a repackaged leftover pressing of the original Hollywood pressing) on Danzig's own Evilive label via Cleopatra Records.

== Track listing ==
=== 1996 original version ===
1. "7th House" – 3:48
2. "Blackacidevil" – 4:25
3. "See All You Were" – 5:03
4. "Sacrifice" – 4:29
5. "Hint of Her Blood" – 5:03
6. "Serpentia" – 6:41
7. "Come to Silver" – 4:01
8. "Hand of Doom: version" – 2:53
9. "Power of Darkness" – 3:19
10. "Ashes" – 5:28

=== 2000 reissue version ===
1. "7th House" – 3:48
2. "Blackacidevil" – 4:24
3. "See All You Were" – 5:02
4. "Sacrifice" – 4:28
5. "Hint of Her Blood" – 5:02
6. "Deeper" – 4:15
7. "Serpentia" – 6:40
8. "Come to Silver" – 4:00
9. "Hand of Doom: version" – 2:52
10. "Bleedangel" – 4:13
11. "Power of Darkness" – 3:19
12. "Ashes" – 5:31
13. "Don't Be Afraid" – 4:25

All songs written by Glenn Danzig, except "Hand of Doom" by Black Sabbath with new lyrics and arrangements by Glenn Danzig.

== Personnel ==
- Glenn Danzig – vocals, bass, guitars, keyboards
- Joey Castillo – drums
- Joseph Bishara – keyboards, programming
- Jerry Cantrell – guitars on "See All You Were", "Come to Silver", and "Hand of Doom"
- Mark Chaussee – guitars on "Sacrifice", "Serpentia"
- Josh Lazie – bass on "Sacrifice"

Production

- Producer – Glenn Danzig
- Engineers – Bill Kennedy, Mike Baumgartner

== Charts ==
Chart (1996)	Peak position
Finnish Albums (Suomen virallinen lista)	23
Swedish Albums (Sverigetopplistan)	49
UK Rock & Metal Albums (Official Charts)	18
US Billboard 200	41
