= Danzig 4 =

Studio album by Danzig
- Released: October 4, 1994
- Recorded: October 1993 – May 1994
- Studios: Ocean Way (Los Angeles); Sound City (Van Nuys)
- Genres: Heavy metal; blues rock
- Length: 61:06
- Label: American Recordings
- Producers: Glenn Danzig, Rick Rubin

Danzig chronology
Thrall-Demonsweatlive (1993)	Danzig 4 (1994)	Danzig 5: Blackacidevil (1996)

Singles from Danzig 4
- 1. "Cantspeak" Released: 1995; 2. "I Don't Mind the Pain" Released: 1995

Danzig 4, also titled Danzig 4P, is the fourth studio album by American heavy metal band Danzig. Released in 1994, it was the band's final album on American Recordings, and the last to feature the original lineup of John Christ (guitar), Eerie Von (bass), and Chuck Biscuits (drums). Danzig 4 followed 1993's highly successful Thrall-Demonsweatlive EP and singer Glenn Danzig's 1992 instrumental solo effort, Black Aria.

== Album title ==
In various 1994-95 interviews, Danzig explained that he did not wish to give the album a title, as he felt that a logo or printing would ruin the artwork, which he wished to stand on its own. After pressure from representatives from American Recordings, who did not want to release an unlabeled album for fear that sales would plummet, Danzig relented and allowed a sticker reading "Danzig 4" to be placed on the album's cellophane wrapper in both the vinyl and CD formats. To the right of the "4" is a tiny uppercase letter "P", in reference to the Four P movement. The following information was supplied by American Recordings in 1994:

"The Four P movement is an alleged Satanic cult operating throughout the United States. An offshoot of the notorious Process Church of the Final Judgment, the Four P movement takes its name from the Process' original sigil: a swastika-like form composed of four interlocking Ps. The Four P movement was supposedly begun in 1967, and has been connected to a number of ritual killings across the country, including the Son of Sam killings in New York and the Manson Family murders in California."

In interviews the band members themselves usually refer to the album simply as Danzig 4, which is printed on the CD itself, the inlay spine, and the labels on the vinyl LP. In the liner notes to the 2007 compilation The Lost Tracks of Danzig, however, Glenn Danzig refers several times to Danzig 4P.

== Production ==
Danzig 4 was recorded at Ocean Way and Sound City Studios in California.

During the song writing process for the album, Glenn Danzig recorded his basic ideas onto a microcassette. The process continued with Glenn Danzig and John Christ working on guitar parts, before the next stage of Eerie Von and Chuck Biscuits working out their parts of the song arrangements.

The band introduced different instruments and used a few industrial sounds in the background of some tracks. Christ explained "We wanted to introduce some new textures into the band, so we experimented with several older, exotic acoustic instruments, including a harmonium, a recorder and wind chimes."

Christ also experimented with his guitar sound: "The big difference on this album in terms of my playing is how I use sound and texture. I experimented with several different types of stereo chorusing and pitch-shifting. For example, my tone on "Son of the Morning Star" constantly evolves throughout the song."

Biscuits preferred the drum sound captured on Danzig 4 to the drum sound on his previous Danzig recordings: "I've had problems with the drum sounds on previous records. They've been too flat, too controlled. In the past, Rick [Rubin] has been into that dry, tight AC/DC sound. This one was looser, with more spaces, more noise."

The CD release ends with an unlisted hidden thirteenth track. According to an interview with Glenn Danzig, the track is titled "Invocation" and is "about a demon fucking somebody." The song is inspired by a black mass Danzig claims to have heard at the Magickal Childe occult emporium in New York. "Invocation" includes a Gregorian chant, and instrumental tracks that are unique to the song, but reversed, as is Glenn Danzig's spoken introduction: "All right, let's hear it back". The track has been described as sounding like a demonic ritual, and Christ described the motivation behind the recording: "People give us a hard time about the 'Devil thing', so we figured, 'Let's give them something to really talk about'." There are several blank tracks before "Invocation", so that it is numbered track 66. CD players that display the "current track number" and "total disc time elapsed" in minutes thus read 66 61:38 on the display as the final track starts. This is perhaps an intentional reference to The Number of the Beast and the song "We Are 138" that Danzig wrote during his days in the Misfits. "Invocation" is not included on the cassette or vinyl versions of the album.

Although the songs "Crucifixion Destruction" and "White Devil Rise" were mentioned in interviews and articles throughout 1994, with Danzig even discussing the latter in some detail, neither song was included on the final version of the album. Along with another outtake from the same sessions, "The Mandrake's Cry", these were finally released in 2007 on the first disc of The Lost Tracks of Danzig (with "Crucifixion Destruction" under its correct title, "Satan's Crucifiction").

== Musical style ==
The album is more experimental than its predecessors, and Glenn Danzig described it as "A very challenging record, philosophically, vocally and musically."

Inspired by accusations that their songs contained hidden Satanic messages, the guitar tracks for "Cantspeak" are those of "Let It Be Captured" played in reverse, as Christ explained: "Eerie Von had the idea of playing one of our songs backwards...we recorded whole guitar solo and drum parts backwards in the songs on this record. In the end we were so obsessed on this that we were trying to really play the whole song "Let It Be Captured" backwards. Therefore, a new song was created - "Cantspeak"."

Christ explained the song structure of "Son of the Morning Star" in more detail: "We actually start out with jazz chords and a funky jazz beat. All of a sudden, we kick into this heavy riff pattern. Then we come back to the original jazz feel, but in a rock version."

== Themes ==
The lyrics to the song "Cantspeak" provide a depiction of helpless desperation.

Glenn Danzig has stated that the song "Going Down to Die" was written about "knowing you're gonna die and dying....some people know they're going to die. They sense it, and they do die. I've known when other people are going to die, and they died." He also revealed that at one point there were plans for the song to be included on the Natural Born Killers film soundtrack.

== Artwork and packaging ==
The album cover features artwork by Glenn Danzig. Glenn Danzig has referred to the symbols on the album cover as "Vehmic runes" that spell out "Danzig". They were taken from the alphabet of a secret tribunal group from Medieval Germany called the Vehmgericht.

The liner notes contain a panoramic picture of the four band members in propped up coffins, flanked by Secret Service men, as a Bill Clinton impersonator shakes hands with a police officer wielding a shotgun. The photo is reminiscent of a 19th-century photograph of dead outlaws on display. Glenn Danzig would later reveal that the FBI considered him a threat to Clinton, the American President at the time of the album release. The liner notes also include a yin yang symbol incorporating the Danzig skull, by artist Michael William Kaluta.

The first pressings of the album were sold in a distinctive cardboard sleeve, which Glenn Danzig claimed was more like that of an old-fashioned LP and more environmentally-friendly than the common plastic CD jewel case. Since this initial release of the album, its cardboard packaging has been replaced by the jewel case.

Like Danzig's previous three albums, Danzig 4 has been labeled with a Parental Advisory (originally in the form of a sticker until the repackaging in the jewel case) since its initial pressings, despite the absence of common profanity.

== Reception ==
Professional ratings
Review scores
Source	Rating
AllMusic	3/5 stars
College Music Journal	(favorable)
Entertainment Weekly	A−
Q	3/5 stars
Request Magazine	(favorable)
Rock Hard	9/10 stars
Rolling Stone	(favorable)
Spin Alternative Record Guide	6/10

- AllMusic - "Danzig's experiments with using texture and atmosphere to evoke their trademark mood of darkness and evil come to the forefront on their fourth full-length album...the music here comes the closest to reflecting the darkness of Glenn Danzig's lyrics. Some, however, may miss their more energetic earlier albums."
- College Music Journal - "Maintaining a mysterious, dark and primal attitude seems to come easy to Danzig, as the group proves itself once again on Danzig 4. Danzig 4 is definitely not for the meek."
- Q - "A little more diversity and a significant tightening up of the songwriting quality has resulted in a dark, moody, and at times powerfully evocative album."
- Request Magazine - "The brooding melancholy of 4 never lets up, aided by the stripped-down coproduction of Rick Rubin. The guitar and vocal distortion adds a psychedelic otherworldly touch while bringing the music back to the rawness of Danzig's garage-punk roots. A Danzig album is always fascinating because the band sounds like no other in hard rock today."
- Trouser Press - "Dark, sinister, violent, theatrically overstated...Danzig sounds a personal note amid the usual fictional depictions ("Bringer of Death," "Stalker Song"). "I Don't Mind the Pain," "Son of the Morning Star," "Let It Be Captured" and "Cantspeak" disguise what appear to be mundane feelings of loneliness in grandiose imagery, although that doesn't explain the sexual violence of "Little Whip." Elsewhere, he indulges in a little garden-variety self-deification ("Brand New God," "Until You Call on the Dark"). The dynamic variety of the long, ambitious record is better than ever, but it's an audibly strenuous effort. Too self-conscious by half and sonically thick-skinned where previous albums ripped away flesh, 4 is pure, but not prime, Danzig."

"Until You Call on the Dark" appears on the 1996 compilation album Big Ones of Alternative Rock vol. 1. The black metal band Behemoth recorded a cover version of "Until You Call on the Dark" for their 2005 EP Slaves Shall Serve.

== Touring and promotion ==
Music videos were released for the songs "Until You Call on the Dark", "I Don't Mind the Pain", "Cantspeak" and "Sadistikal".

"Cantspeak" was produced by the underground director Fred Stuhr, known for his work with the band Tool, and uses a mixture of live-action performance and computer-assisted animation. Discussing the video, Stuhr explained "I wanted to create a sense of someone being trapped, someone who can't speak. He's not alive or dead. He's just an ideal, a soul, an existence floating in and out of this time, this reality." The "Cantspeak" music video appeared on Beavis and Butt-head, in the episode "Animation Sucks".

"Until You Call on the Dark" marked Chuck Biscuits' final music video appearance with Danzig. The music video was initially rejected by MTV's Standards and Practices department due to its lyrical content.

Joey Castillo appears in Biscuits' place in the music videos for "Cantspeak" and "I Don't Mind the Pain".

All music videos from the album are featured on Danzig's Il Demonio Nera DVD.

Shortly after the album had been recorded, Biscuits left the band, returned, and was finally fired. Just prior to the album's release he was replaced by Joey Castillo. Eerie Von and Christ also intended to leave the band, but decided to stay for the remainder of the tour supporting the album and left the band on July 5 the following year.

== Track listing ==
All tracks are written by Glenn Danzig.

No.	Title	Length
1.	"Brand New God"	4:29
2.	"Little Whip"	5:10
3.	"Cantspeak"	4:06
4.	"Going Down to Die"	4:59
5.	"Until You Call on the Dark"	4:24
6.	"Dominion"	4:13
7.	"Bringer of Death"	4:40
8.	"Sadistikal"	5:07
9.	"Son of the Morning Star"	5:04
10.	"I Don't Mind the Pain"	4:45
11.	"Stalker Song"	5:48
12.	"Let It Be Captured"	5:16
66.	"Invocation"	2:59

== Personnel ==
=== Danzig ===
- Glenn Danzig – vocals, guitar, piano
- John Christ – guitar
- Eerie Von – bass
- Chuck Biscuits – drums

=== Production ===
- Producers – Glenn Danzig, Rick Rubin
- Engineers – Jim Scott, Ken Lomas
- Mastering – Stephen Marcussen
- Artwork – Glenn Danzig (cover art), Michael William Kaluta (interior art)
- Photography – Dirk Walter

== Charts ==
Chart (1994)	Peak position
Australian Albums (ARIA Charts)	95
Canada Top Albums/CDs (RPM)	43
German Albums (Offizielle Top 100)	39
Swedish Albums (Sverigetopplistan)	36
US Billboard 200	29

Chart (2026)	Peak position
Finnish Albums (Suomen virallinen lista)	8
Greek Albums (IFPI)	11
Norwegian Physical Albums (IFPI Norge)	10
Swedish Hard Rock Albums (Sverigetopplistan)	10
Swedish Physical Albums (Sverigetopplistan)	7
