= Lucifuge =

Lucifuge may refer to:

- Lucifuge Rofocale, a devil mentioned in the Grand Grimoire
- Danzig II: Lucifuge, 1990 album by Danzig
