= John Christ =

American guitarist (1965–2026)

Background information
- Born: John Wolfgang Knoll; February 19, 1965; Baltimore, Maryland, U.S.
- Died: November 15, 2026 (aged 61)
- Genres: Hard rock; heavy metal; gothic rock; blues rock
- Occupation: Guitarist
- Years active: 1978–2026
- Label: Tang Records
- Formerly of: Danzig; Samhain

John Wolfgang Knoll (February 19, 1965 – November 15, 2026), known professionally as John Christ, was an American musician best known as the original guitarist for the metal band Danzig. He was known for his bluesy hard rock sound and frequent use of the pinch harmonic. Christ was ranked 63rd in Guitar World's list of "The 100 Greatest Metal Guitarists".

== Early life ==
Christ was born the youngest of five children, with four older sisters. Christ first started playing acoustic guitar when he was in grade school and began playing electric guitar at age 13. He had previously taken piano lessons. His first electric guitar was a Univox Les Paul copy. Christ grew up in Catonsville, Maryland and attended Catonsville High School. He later studied classical guitar at the Peabody Institute and attended Towson University studying Jazz, theory and composition.

== Samhain and Danzig ==
In 1987, Christ dropped out of college and moved to New Jersey to join Glenn Danzig's band Samhain, which became the band Danzig later that same year. Upon his arrival in New Jersey, Christ would share an apartment with Samhain drummer London May, for whom Christ had performed his first band audition. Christ auditioned well, but it was not until leaving countless guitar solos on Glenn Danzig's answering machine that he was finally invited to join the band. When May left the band, Christ shared an apartment with new drummer Chuck Biscuits, where they came up with Christ's original stage name "John Von Christ", before it was shortened to avoid it clashing with bassist Eerie Von. Christ played guitar with Danzig from 1987 to July 1995, appearing on the albums Danzig, Lucifuge, How the Gods Kill and 4, and also the Thrall-Demonsweatlive EP. In 1990, Christ recorded guitar for the Samhain album Final Descent. Christ officially left Danzig on July 5, 1995, citing a breakdown in communication within the band as the reason behind his departure. During his time with Danzig, Christ's main guitar was a 1983 BC Rich Bich strung with custom D'Aquisto strings and fit with PRS HFS White label pickups. His backup customized 10-string is currently on display at the Hard Rock Cafe in Orlando.

== Solo career ==
In 1997, Christ was part of the short lived band Juice 13, which also included Randy Castillo, former drummer for Ozzy Osbourne. Christ's guitar work has been used by TV stations ABC and Nine Network. During his time with Nine Network, he provided backing guitar for performances by artists including Tom Jones and Lou Rawls. In 1999, Christ released his debut solo album Flesh Caffeine. In 2003, Christ was involved in a serious crash and suffered injuries to his fretting hand. As a result of his injuries, he underwent lengthy rehabilitation. On November 27, 2009, Christ returned to the live stage for the first time in 10 years with a solo performance in Essex, Maryland.

== Death ==
Christ died on November 15, 2026, at the age of 61. Reports stated that he had been battling cancer, but it was not confirmed if it was related to his death.

== Discography ==
=== Danzig ===
- 1988 – Danzig
- 1990 – Danzig II: Lucifuge
- 1992 – Danzig III: How the Gods Kill
- 1993 – Thrall-Demonsweatlive
- 1994 – Danzig 4
- 2001 – Live on the Black Hand Side
- 2007 – The Lost Tracks of Danzig

=== Samhain ===
- 1990 – Final Descent

=== Solo ===
- 1999 – Flesh Caffeine

=== Others ===
- 1987 – Less than Zero soundtrack album by Various Artists (contributed the track "You and Me (Less than Zero)" with Glenn Danzig & the Power and Fury Orchestra)
- 1994 – Guitar Practicing Musicians 3 by Various Artists (Contributed the track "For Christ's Sake", also featuring Chuck Biscuits)
- 1996 – Guitars That Rule the World, Vol. 2: Smell the Fuzz: The Superstar Guitar Album by Various Artists (Contributed the track "One Song")
- 1999 – Black Glue by Mike Hartman
- 2001 – Metallic Assault: A Tribute to Metallica by Various Artists (Contributed the track "Enter Sandman", also featuring Robert Trujillo, Burton C. Bell and Tommy Aldridge)
- 2012 – Ex Lives by Every Time I Die (Contributed guitar on the track "Revival Mode")
