= Black Aria II =

Studio album by Glenn Danzig
- Released: October 17, 2006
- Recorded: 2004–2006, Paramount Studios, Hollywood, California
- Genre: Classical; dark ambient
- Length: 34:47
- Label: Evilive
- Producer: Glenn Danzig

Glenn Danzig chronology
Circle of Snakes (2004)	Black Aria II (2006)	The Lost Tracks of Danzig (2007)

Professional ratings
Review scores
Source	Rating
AllMusic	2.5/5 stars
antiMusic	5/5 stars
Punknews.org	3.5/5 stars

Black Aria II is the second solo album by Glenn Danzig, released in 2006 as a follow-up to his instrumental album Black Aria (1992). Despite being discussed in various interviews throughout the 1990s, the album was not released until October 17, 2006. It reached the top 10 on the American Billboard classical music chart, and, along with its predecessor, was reissued by Evilive/Cleopatra Records in July 2023.

== Music and recording ==
The writing of Black Aria II was completed in early 2001. The recording began in late 2004, with the majority of tracks finished by early 2005. Due to the album release date being delayed by record label issues, Glenn Danzig used the extra time to further refine the album and record an extra song.

The subtitle of Black Aria II is "Lilith, Whore of the Desert", a reference to Lilith, the first wife of Adam and the subject of the album's content. Danzig explained "This one is more Eastern, because it's about Lilith. It still has a lot of the classic elements I like, but many of the sounds come from elsewhere because of this fascinating story, which has its origins in even older myths and legends."

Black Aria II is produced, written and - with a couple of exceptions - performed by Danzig. Tommy Victor provides some additional guitar, and Tania Themmen performs female vocals. The music employs various sounds, including organ, strings, percussion, chimes, chants and lamentations. Some of the pieces comprise up to 40 individual music tracks. "Unclean Sephira" consists entirely of layered vocal tracks.

Discussing the writing and recording process, Danzig stated "I just let the story take me. Each song tells me what it wants. Sometimes I have it all written in my head - every single part. But at other times, I'll be doing the skeleton framework and different parts will come to me. At times, I'll be listening to playback and suddenly I'll hear where another part can go. It tells me what I need to add."

The track "Lamenta Lilith" is featured during the closing credits to Danzig's 2019 film Verotika.

== Reception ==
- AllMusic - "Far bleaker and more minimalist than its first inception, Black Aria II relies less on string-fueled dread and more on operatic vocals and experimental sounds...there's not a lot to sink your teeth into, but if there were a subcategory in the new age section of your local record store that was reserved for meditation music for the hooded, the damned, and the downright evil, then Black Aria II would must definitely have its own kiosk."
- antiMusic - "Every song and instrument is right on. While some people might feel odd listening to a classical CD that has plenty of weird and demonic sounding chants in the background, I urge you to take Black Aria II for a spin. Black Aria II is a beautifully crafted, spooky masterpiece from Glenn."
- Punknews.org - "The sequel to 1992s Black Aria features a similar tone to its predecessor. However, this piece features less classical music exercises and more dirge-like compositions...It seems engaging standard musical tastes wasn't Danzig's goal here. Instead of creating a good "song", the album suggests Danzig wanted to create an interesting sonic experience. In place of a clever refrain, the album features an interesting sound. Instead of a snappy riff, a new style of multi-tracking is utilized. The music doesn't drive the listener, as with a classic Misfits track. Rather, it washes over the listener, submerging him or her in a mood rather than a rhythm."
- Verbicide Magazine - "The album is a haunting, eerie disc that requires more than one listen to fully appreciate. Once you know the story (or any given interpretation of it anyway), the disc becomes so much more than an album of creepy music from the Danzig front man, but becomes the soundtrack to the birth of evil."

== Artwork ==
Artist Bill Sienkiewicz painted the album's cover art.

== Track listing ==
1. "Overture: Winged Night Demon" - 1:21
2. "Abbandonment / Recreation" - 4:12
3. "Zemaragad" - 3:57
4. "Lamia" - 4:14
5. "Bridal Ceremony of the Lilitu" - 2:16
6. "Dance of the Succubi" - 2:21
7. "Unclean Sephira" - 3:46
8. "LCKR" - 1:43
9. "The Succubus Feeds" - 2:20
10. "Shiddin" - 2:37
11. "Demons Reprise" - 3:13
12. "Lamenta Lilith" - 2:36

All songs written by Glenn Danzig.

== Credits ==
- Glenn Danzig: vocals, keyboards, guitars
- Tommy Victor: extra guitar on "Overture: Winged Night Demon"
- Tania Themmen: female vocals

=== Production ===
- Producer: Glenn Danzig
- Mixing: Glenn Danzig, Chris Rakestraw
- Engineer: Chris Rakestraw
- Mastering: Tom Baker
