= Danzig II: Lucifuge =

Studio album by Danzig
- Released: June 26, 1990
- Recorded: June 1989 – May 1990
- Studio: Hollywood Sound (Hollywood); Larrabee (Hollywood)
- Genre: Heavy metal; blues rock
- Length: 49:26
- Label: Def American
- Producer: Rick Rubin

Danzig chronology
Danzig (1988)	Danzig II: Lucifuge (1990)	Danzig III: How the Gods Kill (1992)

Alternative cover
- Danzig II: Lucifuge's alternate CD cover

Singles from Danzig II: Lucifuge
- 1. "Her Black Wings" Released: 1990

Danzig II: Lucifuge is the second studio album by American heavy metal band Danzig. It was released in 1990 on Def American Recordings and was reissued in the US and UK in 1998 by Def American's successor, American Recordings.

== Music and recording ==
Lucifuge was recorded at three studios in Hollywood: Hollywood Sound Recorders, Larrabee Sound Studios and Summa Music Group over an eleven-month period, between June 1989 and May 1990; up to this point, it was the longest time Glenn Danzig had taken to make an album.

Lucifuge has a pronounced blues influence that adds a sinister edge akin to records by Howlin' Wolf or Robert Johnson, who have both been accused of playing the "Devil's music". Thematically, a number of songs throughout the album ask questions about the concept of evil.

Glenn Danzig said that the song "Killer Wolf" is "my version of an old blues song about a guy who wolfs around the door of every girl in town."

Glenn Danzig has described "I'm the One" as "another blues song...about a guy realizing his destiny." "I'm the One" was originally recorded for Danzig's debut album, as John Christ explained: "We actually recorded 'I'm the One' for the first record, but we decided to save it for this record. It fit the mood of the second album much better. Glenn wanted to do that song for a long time – he even knew what kind of video he wanted it to have long before we did it. It's a cool song: just some guitar and vocals and a little hi-hat in the background."

The introduction to "Long Way Back from Hell" begins with the use of the dive bomb guitar technique. Guitarist John Christ explained: "We worked on the beginning of that song for a long time before we finally got it right – it always sounded too empty. But when Eerie came in with that galloping bass-line, it all kind of fell into place. It has a lot of energy to it and was probably one of the best songs on that album."

Glenn Danzig spoke about the challenge of writing the song "Her Black Wings": "I always know beforehand what kind of record I want to make. Those ideas dictate how the songs will sound. And sometimes it's not always easy to execute the ideas. For example, writing 'Her Black Wings' was a laborious and tedious experience – but that's the way it had to be for the song to come out right."

"777" is a song about the biblical concept of Armageddon and includes the use of slide guitar.

"Blood and Tears" is a Roy Orbison-like ballad about "a girl's failed relationship and her subsequent torment", and is one of Glenn Danzig's personal favorites from the album.

The lyrics to "Snakes of Christ" tell of Glenn Danzig's view that the teachings of Christ have been perverted by religious groups. Glenn Danzig has mentioned in interviews the very noticeable similarity between the main riff from "Snakes of Christ" and that of the later Stone Temple Pilots song "Sex Type Thing".

Regarding the song "Tired of Being Alive", John Christ has suggested that "Lyrically, I think the words are about the way Glenn was feeling at the time." The remaining songs feature subjects including love, sex and religious themes.

A song titled "The Other Side" was finished but not released on the album.

Prior to the album release, Glenn Danzig noted how the band had improved in the interim between the debut recording and the recording of Lucifuge: "Everybody's much more comfortable with each other now. We've toured with each other, hung with each other. The rhythm section is much tighter. It's just a much better band, and that comes through on the album."

== Album title ==
Before its release the album had been tentatively titled "777". The title "Lucifuge" is the imperative form of the Latin compound verb lucifugere, "to flee the light", derived from the noun 'lux' (light) and the verb 'fugere' (to flee). If the title is to be taken literally, "Lucifuge" is thus a command: "flee the light", a phrase included in the lyrics to the song "Girl". It could also be a reference to the Grand Grimoire demon Lucifuge Rofocale.

== Artwork and packaging ==
The original full-color "faces" album cover, composed of portrait photographs of the four band members, is featured on most formats: these include the 12" vinyl LP, the audio cassette, and original pressings of the European and Japanese CDs. The most widely distributed format, the North American CD, also features this cover on the external CD longbox in which original pressings were sold, but its interior CD booklet (like that of later reissues after the longbox had been phased out) features the alternate "chest/cross" album cover, a cropped black-and-white close-up of the photograph of Glenn Danzig found on the back of the LP sleeve and on the interior of all formats. All CD releases feature the "faces" picture on the rear of the CD tray.

Early pressings of the CD include a booklet that unfolds into an inverted cross. The booklet features the passage "Ye are of your father the devil, and the lusts of your father ye will do", the King James translation of John 8:44.

The original CD longbox was affixed with a Def American sticker that warned, "Contains Language Which May Be Objectionable To Some Listeners". Newer American Recordings pressings, like those of Danzig, Thrall-Demonsweatlive, and Danzig 4, have a "Parental Advisory: Explicit Content" warning printed directly on the booklet, even though profanity is mild and infrequent: one use of the word "bastard" in both "Long Way Back From Hell" and "Pain in the World", and the word "bitch" twice in "Her Black Wings").

As with the debut album, Lucifuge was distributed by Geffen Records, but due to the nature of Danzig's music, the company refused to put its name on the packaging.

== Critical reception ==
Professional ratings
Review scores
Source	Rating
AllMusic	4/5 stars
Robert Christgau	B–
Entertainment Weekly	A−
Rock Hard	10/10
The Rolling Stone Album Guide	3.5/5 stars
Select	4/5 stars
Spin	4.5/5 stars

In a positive review for Entertainment Weekly, music critic Greg Sandow said that the album is stronger than its predecessor and called Danzig "a unique hard rock band that thinks evil dominates the world – and seriously examines the consequences." College Music Journal observed "a dank bluesy influence" which makes "thundering riffs crunch and groove as the band delves into more styles than ever before." Robert Palmer, writing in The New York Times, called it "one of the most accomplished and absorbing rock albums of the year" and a "quantum leap" for Danzig, whose founder displays a voice that makes "the persona he often assumes in his lyrics, that of evil incarnate, all the more powerful and believable." Trouser Press gave the record a positive review "Lucifuge corrects the debut's flaws: Rubin's production is much fleshier, and Glenn exercises the theatrical satanic-pagan muscle-stud angle to entertaining effect. The songs (especially the cool, dank beauty of 'Her Black Wings' and the '50s-style melodic tearjerker, 'Blood and Tears') are consistently stronger; a heavy dose of voodoo blues (the stripped-down 'I'm the One') adds pungent flavor to the thematic and musical brew." Neil Perry of Select said "twenty listens on and 'Lucifuge' still comes at you with fresh vigour. This is a taut, muscular, cunning and perfectly executed record", giving further praise for the album's range, Glenn Danzig's "powerful vocal howl", and the band's "mastery of their own art". Sounding a note of disappointment, Robert Christgau wrote in his review of the album that "Misfits fans had convinced me to hold out some hope for Glenn".

In 2002, Spin magazine named Danzig II the 33rd greatest metal album of all time. The magazine's Doug Brod said that it is "perhaps the best collection of songs on a Glenn Danzig album" and remarked that Rick Rubin "mightily punched up" his production after producing Danzig's debut album.

== Music videos ==
Music videos were released for the songs "Her Black Wings", "Killer Wolf", "I'm the One" and "Devil's Plaything". Glenn Danzig and Vincent Giordano directed all videos, aside from "Killer Wolf", which was directed by Anton Corbijn. The video for "I'm the One" includes a scene where Danzig wrestles a live alligator. All music videos from the album appeared on the Lucifuge home video.

== Track listing ==
All tracks are written by Glenn Danzig.

No.	Title	Length
1.	"Long Way Back from Hell"	4:23
2.	"Snakes of Christ"	4:33
3.	"Killer Wolf"	3:59
4.	"Tired of Being Alive"	4:03
5.	"I'm the One"	3:21
6.	"Her Black Wings"	4:46
7.	"Devil's Plaything"	4:13
8.	"777"	5:39
9.	"Blood and Tears"	4:19
10.	"Girl"	4:12
11.	"Pain in the World"	5:52
Total length:		49:26

== Credits ==
- Glenn Danzig – vocals, keyboards
- Eerie Von – bass
- John Christ – guitars
- Chuck Biscuits – drums

=== Production ===
- Producer: Rick Rubin
- Engineers: Dave Bianco, Sylvia Massy, Brendon O'Brien, Martin Schmelze, Jim Scott
- Mastering: George Marino at Sterling Sound, New York City

== Charts ==
Chart (1990)	Peak position
US Billboard 200	74

Chart (2026)	Peak position
Finnish Albums (Suomen virallinen lista)	5
Greek Albums (IFPI)	31
Norwegian Physical Albums (IFPI Norge)	6
Swedish Hard Rock Albums (Sverigetopplistan)	5
Swedish Physical Albums (Sverigetopplistan)	5
UK Rock & Metal Albums (OCC)	38

== Bibliography ==
- Christgau, Robert (2000). Christgau's Consumer Guide: Albums of the '90s. Macmillan. ISBN 0-312-24560-2.
- DeCurtis, Anthony; Henke, James; George-Warren, Holly (1992). The Rolling Stone Album Guide: Completely New Reviews : Every Essential Album, Every Essential Artist (3rd ed.). Random House. ISBN 0-679-73729-4.
