= Archive de la Morte =

Video by Danzig
- Released: 2003
- Recorded: 1992–1993
- Genre: Heavy metal
- Label: Evilive, Regain
- Director: Glenn Danzig, Anton Corbijn, Jonathan Reiss
- Producer: Glenn Danzig

Danzig chronology
Lucifuge: The Video (1991)	Archive de la Morte (2003)	Il Demonio Nera (2005)

Archive de la Morte (French for "Archive of Death") is a DVD released by American heavy metal band Danzig in 2003.

The DVD continues the collection that began with the band's first two VHS releases, Danzig (1989) and Lucifuge: The Video (1991), and chronicles the band's video singles from their third album Danzig III: How the Gods Kill (1992) and their first EP Thrall-Demonsweatlive (1993).

The DVD contains 12 music videos for the US release, and the European release includes an extra bonus video. Frontman Glenn Danzig regained the right of ownership over the music videos after winning a lawsuit against Rick Rubin. However, the R-rated version of "How the Gods Kill" differs slightly from that released in 1992 as part of the How the Gods Kill limited edition CD and VHS box set. According to Danzig, the earlier edit and all other music videos officially released previously by Rubin's American Recordings remain the property of the label.

== Track listing ==
1. "Dirty Black Summer"
2. "Dirty Black Summer" - Glenn Danzig performance
3. "Dirty Black Summer" - Band performance
4. "How the Gods Kill" - R-rated version
5. "How the Gods Kill" - Band performance
6. "Sistinas" (Previously unreleased)
7. "Bodies" - Camera 1 (Previously unreleased)
8. "Bodies" - Camera 2 (Previously unreleased)
9. "It's Coming Down" - MTV version
10. "It's Coming Down" - R-rated version (broadcast on The Box in 1993)
11. "It's Coming Down" - Totally uncensored version
12. "Mother '93" (Live) - (Live video footage and studio recorded music)

Europe bonus track

13. "Left Hand Black" (Live) - (Live performance on October 31, 1992, at the Irvine Meadows Amphitheatre)

All music videos directed by Glenn Danzig, except "Dirty Black Summer" by Anton Corbijn and "It's Coming Down" by Jonathan Reiss.
