= Big Ones of Alternative Rock vol. 1 =

1996 compilation album by various artists

Compilation album by Various Artists
- Released: 1996
- Length: 12 at 44:53
- Label: Boxtunes Records

Professional ratings
Review scores
Source	Rating
Allmusic	link

Big Ones of Alternative Rock vol. 1 was a compilation released in 1996.

== Track listing ==
1. White Zombie - "Thunder Kiss '65" (Robert Cummings/Ivan DePrume/Shauna Reynolds/
  Jay Noel Yuenger) - 3:55
2. Bush - "Everything Zen" (Gavin Rossdale) - 4:38
3. The Cranberries - "Dreams" (Noel Hogan/Dolores O'Riordan) - 4:29
4. Juliana Hatfield - "Universal Heart-Beat" (Juliana Hatfield) - 3:25
5. CIV - "Can't Wait One Minute More" (Walter Schreifels) - 2:32
6. Whale - "Hobo Humpin' Slobo Babe" (Whale) - 3:59
7. Divinyls - "I Touch Myself" (Christina Amphlett/Tom Kelly/Mark McEntee/William Steinberg) - 3:44
8. G. Love & Special Sauce - "Cold Beverage" (G. Love) - 2:33
9. Korn - "Blind" (Reginald "Fieldy" Arvizu/Jonathan Davis/Don Schinn/James "Munky" Shaffer/Ryan Shuck/
  David Silveria/Brian Welch) - 4:08
10. Deadeye Dick - "New Age Girl" (Caleb Guillotte) - 3:28
11. Meat Puppets - "Backwater" (Curt Kirkwood) - 3:40
12. Danzig - "Until You Call on the Dark" (Glenn Danzig) - 4:27
