= Death Rider in the House of Vampires =

- Directed by: Glenn Danzig
- Written by: Glenn Danzig
- Produced by: James Cullen Bressack
- Starring: Devon Sawa
- Cinematography: Glenn Danzig; Pedja Radenkovic
- Edited by: Glenn Danzig; Garo Setian
- Music by: Glenn Danzig
- Release date: August 27, 2021
- Running time: 92 minutes
- Country: United States
- Language: English

Death Rider in the House of Vampires is a 2021 American Western horror drama film written and directed by Glenn Danzig and starring Devon Sawa. In addition to writing and directing, Danzig also served as the film’s composer.

== Cast ==
- Devon Sawa as Death Rider
- Kim Director as Carmilla Joe
- Julian Sands as Count Holliday
- Glenn Danzig as Bad Bathory
- Eli Roth as Drac Cassidy
- Danny Trejo as Bela Latigo
- Ashley Wisdom as Mina Belle
- Victor DiMattia as Kid Vlad
- Kansas Bowling as Rider’s Dead Sister
- Yulia Klass as Mircarla Mae

== Production ==
In December 2019, it was announced that Sawa was cast in the film.

In January 2020, it was announced that Trejo was cast in the film.

== Release ==
The film was released on August 27, 2021. Then it was released on DVD and Blu-ray in December 2023.

== Reception ==
Patrick Bromley of Bloody Disgusting awarded the film two “skulls” out of five.
