= Danzig (album) =

Studio album by Danzig
- Released: August 30, 1988
- Recorded: September 1987 – April 1988
- Studios: Atlantic Recording Studios and Chung King Metal (New York City)
- Genres: Heavy metal; blues rock
- Length: 40:58
- Label: Def American
- Producer: Rick Rubin

Danzig chronology
| Danzig (1988) | Danzig II: Lucifuge (1990) |

Danzig is the debut studio album by American heavy metal band Danzig, released in August 1988. The album was the first release on producer Rick Rubin's new label Def American Recordings. Def American's successor, American Recordings, reissued the album in the United States and United Kingdom in 1998. It remains the band's best-selling album having been certified gold in the U.S. in 1994, and has since been certified platinum. Danzig promoted the album with a successful world tour in 1988–1989.

== Music and recording ==
Danzig was recorded at Atlantic Recording Studios and Chung King Metal, and mixed at Smoke Tree and Village. These sessions took place between September 1987 and April 1988.

The song "Mother", retitled as "Mother '93" and with live audience overdubs, became a hit on radio and MTV in 1993–94 after a new video-single with live footage was created to mark its inclusion on Thrall-Demonsweatlive. The song was also later included on various hard rock and heavy metal music compilations, and featured in the video game series Guitar Hero. It also appeared on the soundtrack to the 2013 film The Hangover Part III.

Glenn Danzig originally wrote the songs "Twist of Cain" and "Possession" for his previous band, Samhain. Lyrically, "Twist of Cain" is inspired by the biblical story of Cain and Abel. Guitarist John Christ described the recording of "Twist of Cain": "We started writing that song even before [drummer] Biscuits joined the band. At first we started recording it in G, then at the last minute we decided that A was better. We kept the drum tracks as they were and re-recorded the guitars, bass and vocals. Not many people know this, but James Hetfield (of Metallica) came down and recorded some backing vocals on that track." Hetfield also recorded backing vocals on "Possession"; however, due to contractual reasons, he could not be credited in the album insert. A backwards piano track is used during the intro to "Possession".

John Christ has described "She Rides" as "Our first sex song...it's such a stripped-down song, just a couple of guitar tracks and almost no bass. "She Rides" probably has the best vocal performance on the album, though. There are also some really weird background noises and moaning sounds on it." Generally the song refers to mythology on Lilith. References to "she rides/from the daylight in chains" reflect traditional methods for binding demons. The song also appears to take inspiration from the poetry of Christopher Brennan, in particular part xiii of the "Lilith" sequence of The Forest of Night: "She is the night: all horror is of her..."

While the album's liner notes expressly state "All songs written by Glenn Danzig", the song "The Hunter" was written by Booker T. & the M.G.'s and Carl Wells. Originally recorded by Albert King, the Danzig version of the song only features slightly modified lyrics.

== Artwork and packaging ==
Original LP, CD, and cassette versions of the album cover had no identifying text whatsoever, only a white skull on a black background. The skull, also used on the Samhain albums Initium and November-Coming-Fire, was taken from the cover of the Marvel comic book The Saga of Crystar, Crystal Warrior (issue 8). It was drawn by artist Michael Golden, who is not credited. The skull on the album cover was drawn by Danzig.

Later pressings of the compact disc added the Danzig band name logo in the lower right. While 1990–1998 pressings of the CD had the Parental Advisory label in the form of a sticker on the cellophane wrap, pressings since 1998 have the label printed on the artwork. Danzig is one of few albums labeled as "explicit" despite the virtual absence of profanity, save for one use of "whore". Glenn Danzig commented on this use of the advisory label: "That's because of its content. We're making people think. You're not allowed to make people think in the United States. You're not allowed to have them question the government or authority."

== Reception ==
Professional ratings
Review scores
| Source | Rating |
|---|---|
| AllMusic | 3.5/5 stars |
| Collector's Guide to Heavy Metal | 5/10 |
| Melody Maker | (favorable) |
| Pitchfork | 8.5/10 |
| Rock Hard | 7.5/10 |
| The Rolling Stone Album Guide | 3/5 stars |
| Spin Alternative Record Guide | 7/10 |

- AllMusic - "Danzig debuts with a record of simple, pounding, bluesy metal featuring lead singer Glenn Danzig's trademark Elvis-meets-Jim Morrison bellow and outlandishly dark, evil lyrics. There isn't a great deal of musical variety or complexity here, but the band powers its way through such signature tunes as 'Twist of Cain,' 'Am I Demon,' and the (future) hit 'Mother' with a primal energy."
- Thrasher - "Glenn Danzig has built up a new unit that's so damn powerful, so relentlessly brutal, it staggers the senses just to comprehend. The ensemble drives forth with a new force, an ambitious direction and absolutely ferocious power. Glenn's vocals have matured with age; his croons are commanding expressions of the full range of his voice...the music explodes with a vigorous combination of hooks and punches that wallop a tight, clean drive; a forceful nucleus of hard rocking energy. All together Danzig provide a heavy dose of pure entertainment that has awesome momentum and pile-driving fury. Danzig becomes more impressive with every listen."
- Trouser Press - "Danzig is a crunchy and lusty demonic cross between The Doors, Misfits and Black Sabbath. Roughly half of the album is ominous and mighty, the rest displays the weak underbelly of Rubin's thinly homogeneous production."

In 2017, Rolling Stone ranked Danzig as 23rd on their list of "The 100 Greatest Metal Albums of All Time". In 2025, Consequence ranked it at number 44 on their list of the "75 Best Metal Albums of All Time".

== Music videos ==
Music videos were released for the songs "Twist of Cain", "Am I Demon", "Mother" and "She Rides". Upon its release the music video for "Mother" was banned by MTV for containing controversial imagery. All four music videos later appeared on the Danzig home video.

== 35th anniversary ==
In May 2023, Glenn Danzig unveiled a series of live performance dates in celebration of the 35th anniversary of the self-titled debut album. The band played the first Danzig album for these concerts.

== Track listing ==
All songs written by Glenn Danzig, except "The Hunter" (Jones/Jackson/Dunn/Cropper/Wells).

| No. | Title | Length |
|---|---|---|
| 1. | "Twist of Cain" | 4:17 |
| 2. | "Not of This World" | 3:42 |
| 3. | "She Rides" | 5:10 |
| 4. | "Soul on Fire" | 4:36 |
| 5. | "Am I Demon" | 4:57 |
| 6. | "Mother" | 3:24 |
| 7. | "Possession" | 3:56 |
| 8. | "End of Time" | 4:02 |
| 9. | "The Hunter" (Albert King cover) | 3:32 |
| 10. | "Evil Thing" | 3:16 |
| Total length: | | 40:58 |

== Credits ==
=== Danzig ===
- Glenn Danzig – vocals
- Eerie Von – bass
- John Christ – guitars
- Chuck Biscuits – drums

=== Additional personnel ===
- James Hetfield – background vocals on "Twist of Cain" and "Possession" (uncredited)

=== Production ===
- Rick Rubin – producer
- Dave Bianco – engineer
- Steve Ett – engineer
- Jim Scott – engineer
- Howie Weinberg – mastering
- Barry Diament – CD mastering
- Mark Weiss – photography

== Charts ==
| Chart (1988) | Peak position |
|---|---|
| US Billboard 200 | 125 |

| Chart (2026) | Peak position |
|---|---|
| Finnish Albums (Suomen virallinen lista) | 4 |
| Greek Albums (IFPI) | 28 |
| Norwegian Physical Albums (IFPI Norge) | 2 |
| Swedish Hard Rock Albums (Sverigetopplistan) | 3 |
| Swedish Physical Albums (Sverigetopplistan) | 4 |
| UK Rock & Metal Albums (Official Charts) | 23 |

== Certifications ==
| Region | Certification | Certified units/sales |
|---|---|---|
| United States (RIAA) | Gold | 500,000^{^} |
^{^} Shipments figures based on certification alone.
