= Il Demonio Nera =

Video by Danzig
- Released: 2005
- Recorded: 1994–1997
- Genre: Heavy metal
- Label: Evilive, Regain
- Director: Glenn Danzig, Peter Christopherson, Fred Stuhr, Dean Karr, Elias Merhige
- Producer: Glenn Danzig

Danzig chronology
Archive de la Morte (2004)	Il Demonio Nera (2005)

Il Demonio Nera (non-standard Italian for "The Black Devil") is a DVD released by American heavy metal band Danzig in 2005. The release is the follow-up to Archive de la Morte from the previous year.

The video for "Until You Call on the Dark" is notable as its filming marked original drummer Chuck Biscuits' final public appearance as a member of the band. The footage was shot at The Henry Fonda Theater in Hollywood, California, after Danzig's role as special guest on Metallica's 1994 summer tour. A band performance of the track "Until You Call on the Dark" is listed on the sleeve, but is not included in the DVD content itself.

== Track listing ==
1. "Until You Call on the Dark" - MTV version
2. "Until You Call on the Dark" - Glenn Danzig performance
3. "Cantspeak" - Clean version
4. "Cantspeak" - Filter Pass version
5. "I Don't Mind the Pain" - MTV version
6. "I Don't Mind the Pain" - Glenn Danzig performance
7. "I Don't Mind the Pain" - Band performance
8. "Sadistikal" - Black and white version (Previously unreleased)
9. "Sadistikal" - Black and white and Color version (Previously unreleased)
10. "Sacrifice" - Director's cut, Letterbox version
11. "Serpentia" - Regular version (Previously unreleased)
12. "Serpentia" - Alternative version (Previously unreleased)

All music videos directed by Glenn Danzig, except "Until You Call on the Dark" by Peter Christopherson, "Cantspeak" by Fred Stuhr, "I Don't Mind the Pain" by Dean Karr, and "Serpentia" by Elias Merhige.
