= Mother (Danzig song) =

- Cover to the 1993–94 single

Single by Danzig

from the album Danzig
- Released: August 30, 1988 (original); Fall 1993 (US reissue); April–May 1994 (US, UK, Europe and Australia reissue)
- Recorded: 1987 at Atlantic Recording Studios and Chung King Metal in New York City
- Genre: Heavy metal; hard rock
- Length: 3:24
- Label: Def American (original); American Recordings (reissue)
- Songwriter: Glenn Danzig
- Producer: Rick Rubin

Danzig singles chronology
"Who Killed Marilyn?" (1981)	"Mother" (1988)	"Her Black Wings" (1990)

Alternative cover
- Cover to the alternative 1994 UK and Europe single

"Mother" is a song by American heavy metal band Danzig. It was originally released in August 1988 as the lead single from their debut album, Danzig (1988).

In 1993–1994, almost six years after its original release, a remixed version of the song titled "Mother '93" became a hit on radio and earned Buzz Bin rotation on MTV after a music video incorporating live footage was created to promote the band's new EP, Thrall-Demonsweatlive. During this time the single was reissued by American Recordings, with the remix title updated to "Mother '94" on later versions.

"Mother" remains Danzig's highest-charting single. It peaked at number 17 on the Billboard Hot Mainstream Rock Tracks chart and 43 on the Billboard Hot 100. In the UK, the song peaked at number 62 on the singles chart.

== Writing and recording ==
Following the success of "Mother", Glenn Danzig recalled writing the song: "I remember calling Rick Rubin in the middle of the night and telling him that I wrote an incredible song—probably the best song I'd ever written. It was the song I always wanted to write. The first time we played it, people went crazy. But I never wrote that song to make it a hit—I never wrote that way, and I still don't. I write songs so that they say something and do something, and if people like them, great—and if they don't, they don't."

The "Mother '93" remix included extra reverb and a minor modification to the guitar solo. The "live" version of "Mother '93" included an overdubbed concert audience atop the original track.

== Content ==
Thematically, the song is a rhetorical challenge to parents, primarily inspired by Tipper Gore who, along with the Parents Music Resource Center, introduced the Parental Advisory warning placed on albums that contain explicit content. Glenn Danzig explained further: "Al Gore wanted to tell people what they could listen to and what they couldn't...it was basically coming down to the idea that he wouldn't let anybody record any music that he didn't think you should be doing. There was going to be an organization that would tell you what you could and couldn't record. And certainly if you couldn't record it, you couldn't put it out. It was really fascist."

== Music video ==
The video begins with the quotation "Then I saw there was a way to Hell even from the gates of Heaven", taken from The Pilgrim's Progress by John Bunyan. The original 1988 music video was rejected by MTV for its ending sequence, which contains imagery of a chicken being sacrificed and an inverted cross being drawn in its blood (although Glenn Danzig noted that no chickens were actually killed nor harmed).

The "Mother '93" music video used concert footage taken from the band's Halloween 1992 performance at the Irvine Meadows Amphitheater in California, with additional footage shot in the UK.

Both the original "Mother" music video and the live footage version appeared on Beavis and Butt-head, in the episodes "Couch Fishing" and "Crisis Line" respectively.

== Covers ==
The song has been covered by Anberlin, The Independents, Coheed and Cambria, Mason Jennings, Lissie, Edge of Sanity and by Tim McIlrath of Rise Against. The song has been covered live by Sleater-Kinney, Umphrey's McGee, Motionless in White, Ryan Adams, and as part of The A.V. Club's A.V. Undercover series, by the band Wye Oak. There is also a parody cover called "Glenn Leipzig: Mudder" by the German metal band J.B.O.: as Danzig is the name of a formerly German (Prussian) city, Leipzig is the name of an East German city; appropriately the song is sung entirely in a humorous East German accent.

== Charts ==
=== Mother '93 ===
Chart (1993–1994)	Peak position
Finland (Suomen virallinen lista)	20
Germany (GfK)	93
UK Singles (Official Charts)	62
US Billboard Hot 100	43
US Mainstream Rock Airplay (Billboard)	17
US Cash Box Top 100	38

== Certifications ==
Region	Certification	Certified units/sales
New Zealand (RMNZ)	Gold	15,000^{‡}
^{‡} Sales+streaming figures based on certification alone.
