= 6:66 Satan's Child =

Danzig 6:66 Satan's Child
- Cover to the standard edition of the album

Studio album by Danzig
- Released: November 2, 1999
- Recorded: September 15, 1998 – January 1999
- Studios: NRG Studios; A&M Recording Studios; Big Love Studios
- Genres: Heavy metal; industrial metal
- Length: 53:10
- Label: Evilive/E-Magine
- Producers: Glenn Danzig, Pete Lorimer

Danzig chronology
Danzig 5: Blackacidevil (1996)	Danzig 6:66 Satan's Child (1999)	Live on the Black Hand Side (2001)

Alternative cover
- Limited edition cover by Martin Emond

Professional ratings
Review scores
Source	Rating
AllMusic	3/5 stars
Blistering	favorable
Canoe.ca	mixed
College Music Journal	favorable
Exclaim!	favorable
Rock Hard	10/10

6:66 Satan's Child is the sixth studio album by American heavy metal band Danzig. It was released in 1999 on E-Magine Records.

== Music and recording ==
6:66 Satan's Child continues the industrial metal sound, and effects-treated vocals of its predecessor Blackacidevil. It was the first Danzig album to be produced using digital recording methods, as Glenn Danzig explained: "This record is the first time I've ever recorded my vocals digitally. I recorded with a mic and in a booth, but through a computer, and that's how the overdubs were done on this record as well. What I tried to do with this record is take all my favorite elements from Danzig 1 through 5, and the Thrall EP, put it all together and add a couple of new flavors."

The lyrical themes on the album include pain, evil and death. "East Indian Devil (Kali's Song)" was written about the goddess Kali.

Glenn Danzig originally wrote "Thirteen" for Johnny Cash, whose acoustic version appears in an edited form on his 1994 American Recordings album, and in its full-length on disc 5 of Cash's posthumous 2003 Unearthed Box Set. Danzig recalled writing the song: "Suddenly one day in 1993 I was called and asked if I wanted to write a song for Johnny Cash. Of course! The original Man in Black! It was an honor. It took me about twenty minutes to write "Thirteen", which is my understanding of Cash and his career. Then I actually went down to him on his farm in Tennessee to teach him the song. He turned out to be a really nice man". The song is a mournful dialogue of a life blighted by bad luck and misery. Danzig's own version of "Thirteen" is gothic blues in style, and is featured as the opening song in the 2009 film The Hangover. "Thirteen" was covered by Mark Kozelek on his 2013 covers album Like Rats.

A remixed version of "Belly of the Beast", called "underBelly of the Beast", appeared on the soundtrack to The Crow: Salvation in 2000. A remix of "Unspeakable" appeared on the soundtrack to the Grub Girl pornographic movie.

"Five Finger Crawl" has appeared on the Nuclear Blast compilation albums Death Is Just the Beginning, Vol. 6 and Beauty in Darkness, Vol. 4, both released in 2000. It was also used for the opening theme of Xtreme Pro Wrestling's TV show, where Danzig bassist Josh Lazie was working at the time. Lazie most notably managed the wrestler Sabu, who used the song "Firemass" as his entrance theme in XPW.

== Album title ==
Glenn Danzig has said of the album title: "This is Danzig's sixth, and the title was too great to resist", in reference to the number of the beast, with the colon added to give the title a biblical spin. Danzig has stated that the album title caused some controversy, with several retailers refusing to carry, promote or display it.

In the album's artwork, the title and the eponymous song are spelled without the apostrophe. The fifth song is spelled "w/out" in the CD and artwork and "without" in the cassette. Likewise, the final song is generally referred to as "Thirteen" while in some editions is written with the numeral "13". The tenth song contains the word "abandonement" instead of the orthographically correct "abandonment", seemingly on purpose. The same happens, although more obviously, with the eleventh track's phonetical title "apokalips", instead of "apocalypse".

== Artwork and packaging ==
The regular album cover is by Simon Bisley. The limited edition cover is by Martin Emond and was initially only available via internet orders.

A special edition of the album, distributed in Europe by Nuclear Blast, came with a Satan's Child cover art sticker and was packaged in a black jewel case.

== Reception ==
- College Music Journal – "On his sixth album 6:66 Satan's Child, Mr. Danzig keeps moving forward with his signature ideas. The album has belligerent riffage, effects-treated vocals, and doom 'n' gloom lyrics...Satan's Child is like a midnight ride in a hearse through a cemetery."
- Blistering – "A tightly-alloyed descent into the miasmic world below built on Glenn Danzig's post-industrial musings, evil-dead harmony and plenty of aggression...Ultimately, 6:66 Satan's Child is well written and convincingly delivered."

== Music videos ==
A music video was released for the song "Five Finger Crawl".

== Amazon glitch ==
In early January 2024, users on the social media app Reddit noticed the listing for the record on Amazon had a glitch. When ordered, they would instead receive a random record, majority of them turning out to be worth more than what they paid. This led to the album temporarily rising to #1 in most sold Rock and Metal album categories, and #6 overall most sold album in CDs and Vinyl on Amazon.

== Track listing ==
All tracks are written by Glenn Danzig.

No.	Title	Length
1.	"Five Finger Crawl"	3:38
2.	"Belly of the Beast"	4:28
3.	"Lilin"	6:31
4.	"Unspeakable"	4:12
5.	"Cult Without a Name"	4:39
6.	"East Indian Devil (Kali's Song)"	4:03
7.	"Firemass"	3:52
8.	"Cold Eternal"	4:41
9.	"Satan's Child"	3:30
10.	"Into the Mouth of Abandonement" (sic)	4:37
11.	"Apokalips"	4:45
12.	"Thirteen"	4:12

== Personnel ==
Danzig

- Glenn Danzig – vocals, (additional) guitars
- Josh Lazie – bass
- Joey Castillo – drums
- Jeff Chambers – (guest) guitars

Additional personnel

- Producers: Glenn Danzig, Peter Lorimer
- Engineers: Josh Abraham
- Mixing: Jay Gordon, Amir Derakh, Glenn Danzig, Peter Lorimer, John X, Cameron Webb

== Charts ==
Chart (1999)	Peak position
Finnish Albums (Suomen virallinen lista)	32
German Albums (Offizielle Top 100)	54
Swedish Albums (Sverigetopplistan)	59
US Billboard 200	149
