= Danzig III: How the Gods Kill =

- Cover art by H. R. Giger

Studio album by Danzig
- Released: July 14, 1992
- Recorded: November 1991 – April 1992
- Studios: Record Plant; Hollywood Sound Recorders
- Genres: Heavy metal; blues rock
- Length: 49:12
- Label: Def American
- Producers: Glenn Danzig; Rick Rubin

Danzig chronology
Danzig II: Lucifuge (1990)	Danzig III: How the Gods Kill (1992)	Thrall-Demonsweatlive (1992)

Singles from Danzig III: How The Gods Kill
- 1. "Dirty Black Summer" Released: 1992

Danzig III: How the Gods Kill is the third studio album by American heavy metal band Danzig, and the highest to chart at the time of its release in 1992 on Def American Recordings. It was reissued in 1998 by Def American's successor, American Recordings.

== Music and recording ==
AllMusic says that How the Gods Kill "continues to expand the band's musical range". Pitchfork said that the album's sound reflected "Danzig‘s interest in pre-rock blues and pop music"; melding the influences of Willie Dixon, Roy Orbison and Howlin' Wolf into a sound that the magazine described as "Danzig at his most sinister, yet also his most human". Dixon had agreed to guest on the track "Heart of the Devil", but died before the recording session was scheduled. Request magazine said that the album's music "combines gothic sensibility with Top 40 soul" and that Glenn Danzig's vocals displayed far less of a "country-rockabilly twang" than on the band's previous two albums.

Bassist Eerie Von considers the album to be Danzig's best, with the band at its peak and able to record most of the basic tracks for each song within a couple of takes.

Guitarist John Christ noted how a lot of time was spent perfecting the guitar sounds for the album. For the quieter moments on the songs "Anything", "Sistinas" and "How the Gods Kill", Christ used a Strat guitar previously played by Jeff Beck. The composition of "Sistinas" and the title track, according to AllMusic, "attempt to match their music with the darkness of Glenn Danzig's lyrics", a departure from the blues riffs played elsewhere.

The title song "How the Gods Kill" concerns a search for knowledge and an understanding of oneself. According to John Christ, “That was a real tricky song to write and record. It has so many level jumps and changes in the sound of the guitar. I had to go from a very soft section to a very loud section to an in-between section. If you listen closely, you can hear a hissing noise in the vocals in the intro because we were using a real noisy vocal preamp. We tried everything to get rid of it, but Glenn's performance was so good that we decided to leave it - the mood was just right.”

"Dirty Black Summer" was the first single from the album. The song was inspired by memories of Glenn Danzig's own adolescent summers.

The tracks "How the Gods Kill" and "Dirty Black Summer" became popular and remain a permanent fixture in the band's set list.

The song "Sistinas" was written during a drum track recording session, as John Christ recalled: “We were in the studio recording drum tracks, and while we were on a break Glenn picked up my guitar and started getting an idea for a song. Then I came up with a little chorus part, and in about an hour or two we had the basic structure of the song. He wanted it to have a Roy Orbison type of vibe with some timpani and keyboards. We used an old Fender amp with a vibrato on it, and we cranked up the vibrato to get those really big chords - it was perfect for that song.” Glenn Danzig has described "Sistinas" as being about "depression, isolation, loneliness."

Opening track "Godless" is about feelings of frustration caused by organised religion.

"Heart of the Devil" was the first song on the album to be performed live by the band, during the European Lucifuge tour in 1991. Later in the same year, it was confirmed that the tracks "Bodies" and "Do You Wear the Mark" had been written for the album. The avant-garde metal band Lux Occulta recorded a cover version of "Heart of the Devil" for their 1998 EP Maior Arcana: The Words That Turn Flesh into Light.

== Artwork and packaging ==
The album's cover is a 1976 painting called Meister und Margeritha (The Master and Margarita) by famous Swiss artist H. R. Giger, named after Mikhail Bulgakov's novel The Master and Margarita. For the album cover, Giger modified the original painting slightly, covering "the Master's" erect penis with a dagger bearing his interpretation of the Danzig skull symbol. Giger's version of the Danzig skull was later used on T-shirts and as the cover art for the "Dirty Black Summer" single.

Like Danzig's other three albums with the original lineup, this album was issued a Parental Advisory sticker, later complete with a "strong language" warning, despite the total absence of profanity.

The album was also issued in a limited edition CD longbox with an embossed version of the H. R. Giger artwork. The CD included with this edition has an alternate cover showing a photo of the band, and contains a VHS tape featuring the uncensored "How the Gods Kill" music video.

== Reception ==
Professional ratings
Review scores
Source	Rating
AllMusic	4/5 stars
CMJ New Music Report	(favorable)
Pitchfork	8.7/10
Rock Hard	9.5/10 stars
Rolling Stone	4/5 stars
Spin Alternative Record Guide	4/10

AllMusic wrote, "Danzig's third album continues to expand the band's musical range" and called it "arguably the definitive Danzig album". Rolling Stone wrote, "Danzig the group has evolved, in the course of three albums, into a resourceful, tightly meshed unit...Danzig embodies the best in contemporary hard rock while displaying an originality that transcends genres...Rock is alarmingly short of visionaries these days; Danzig is the genuine article". Hit Parader, while saying that the album is too unrelenting to cause Danzig to break into the mainstream, wrote, "They deserve whatever recognition they get simply for having the guts to play metal the way it was meant to be played." Trouser Press called it "a roaring slab of leathery rock that isn't overly troubled by his lyrical obsessions", highlighting "Do You Wear the Mark" and "Heart of the Devil" as examples of Danzig's interest in dark topics. The review also describes Danzig's "confidence (or hubris, same difference here)" in "Sistinas", which is performed "as a ridiculous croony gothic ballad". The review concludes, "Economical and efficient, an organic blend of vocals and instrumental intensity, How the Gods Kill is great bleak fun." Bob Mack of Spin called the band "too goofy to be taken seriously as regular rockers but not goofy enough for the cartoon metal crowd" and wrote that the lyrics to "Heart of the Devil", instead of sending a shiver down his spine, caused him to roll his eyes. He complimented "Left Hand Black" and called "Sistinas" the "best Orchestral Manoeuvres in the Dark song since OMD's 1984 LP Junk Culture". Daina Darzin of Request praised the album for its "solidly crafted melodies" and "lush, malevolent power", along with Danzig's "wonderfully expressive, opulent voice" and the "spectral mystique" added by John Christ's guitar work. Writing about the lyrics she stated that Danzig "has the courage to go for fatalistic grandeur and gets away with it, for the most part", citing lyrics to "Heart of the Devil" as an exception. Pitchfork described it as the "album that lived up to the mighty image he'd built" and said later albums did not live up to this.. In a career retrospective, Cam Lindsay of Exclaim! rated it Glenn Danzig's second best album.

== Music videos ==
Music videos were released for the songs "How the Gods Kill", "Dirty Black Summer", "Bodies" and "Sistinas". Glenn Danzig directed all videos, aside from "Dirty Black Summer", which was directed by Anton Corbijn. A live performance of the song "Left Hand Black" has also been released. The "How the Gods Kill" music video appeared on Beavis and Butt-Head, in the episode "Scientific Stuff". All music videos from the album are featured on Danzig's Archive de la Morte DVD.

A documentary was filmed during the making of How the Gods Kill, though it currently remains unreleased.

== Track listing ==
All tracks are written by Glenn Danzig.

No.	Title	Length
1.	"Godless"	6:51
2.	"Anything"	4:49
3.	"Bodies"	4:25
4.	"How the Gods Kill"	5:57
5.	"Dirty Black Summer"	5:14
6.	"Left Hand Black"	4:30
7.	"Heart of the Devil"	4:40
8.	"Sistinas"	4:25
9.	"Do You Wear the Mark"	4:47
10.	"When the Dying Calls"	3:31
Total length:		49:12

== Credits ==
- Glenn Danzig – vocals, keyboards
- Eerie Von – bass
- John Christ – guitars
- Chuck Biscuits – drums

=== Production ===
- Producers: Glenn Danzig and Rick Rubin
- Executive Producer: Rick Rubin
- Engineers: Nick DiDia, Craig Brock, Jim Labinski, Randy Wine
- Mixing: Jason Corsaro
- Mastering: Howie Weinberg
- Design: Dirk Walter
- Illustrations: H.R. Giger
- Photographer: Peter Darley Miller

== Charts ==
Chart (1992)	Peak position
Austrian Albums (Ö3 Austria)	39
Canada Top Albums/CDs (RPM)	45
German Albums (Offizielle Top 100)	20
Swiss Albums (Schweizer Hitparade)	29
US Billboard 200	24

Chart (2026)	Peak position
Finnish Albums (Suomen virallinen lista)	7
Greek Albums (IFPI)	88
Norwegian Physical Albums (IFPI Norge)	7
Swedish Hard Rock Albums (Sverigetopplistan)	6
Swedish Physical Albums (Sverigetopplistan)	6
UK Rock & Metal Albums (Official Charts)	37
