= Chuck Biscuits =

Canadian drummer

- Born: Charles Montgomery; April 17, 1965 (age 61); British Columbia, Canada
- Genres: Punk rock; hardcore punk; heavy metal; doom metal
- Occupation: Musician
- Instrument: Drums
- Years active: 1977–1999
- Formerly of: D.O.A.; Black Flag; Circle Jerks; Danzig; Social Distortion

Chuck Biscuits (born Charles Montgomery on April 17, 1965) is a retired Canadian drummer best known for his work across multiple punk rock and heavy metal bands.

Biscuits was a member of D.O.A. from 1978 to 1982, playing on the band's first two albums before briefly joining Black Flag and later Circle Jerks. He later joined Danzig in 1987, playing on the band's first four albums as well as their first EP before leaving in 1994. Most recently, he played in Social Distortion from 1996 to 1999.

== Career ==
=== Musical Influence ===
Biscuits has named his main influences as John Bonham, Rat Scabies of the Damned, Topper Headon of the Clash, Keith Moon and Stewart Copeland.

=== Black Flag & Circle Jerks Era ===
Biscuits is the brother of Ken "Dimwit" Montgomery, a fixture on the Vancouver music scene—at different times, both brothers played drums for D.O.A. Biscuits joined Black Flag in 1982 and toured with them for five months. His only studio recordings for the band were the 1982 demos for the My War album, which have been widely bootlegged.

However, Biscuits and Henry Rollins had clashing personalities, and problems with their record label nudged the drummer to jump ship and join original Black Flag singer Keith Morris’s influential band, the Circle Jerks. Biscuits played with the Circle Jerks relatively briefly until he joined Floorlords. Biscuits planned to quit the music business and took art and electrical engineering courses when that band broke up. He briefly filled in on drums for a few shows for the Red Hot Chili Peppers during their Freaky Styley tour in 1986.

=== Danzig Era ===
In 1987, producer Rick Rubin invited Biscuits to become the drummer for Danzig. Biscuits had been vocalist/songwriter Glenn Danzig's first choice as drummer for his band.

Biscuits joined Danzig in 1987 and appeared on the band's first four albums and one EP. In 1990, he recorded drums for one track on Glenn Danzig's final album with the band Samhain. In 1994, he became the first member of the original Danzig line-up to leave the band, citing a contract dispute as the reason for his departure.

=== Social Distortion ===
Biscuits left Danzig in 1994 over royalty disagreements. He was replaced by a pre-Queens Of The Stone Age Joey Castillo, after Dave Grohl turned down an offer to join. Biscuits tried to rejoin the group but was rejected and forced to find another group to play with. In 1996, Biscuits hooked up with another big act from the punk scene, joining Social Distortion between the recording and release of the band's White Light, White Heat, White Trash album. Biscuits is credited on the album's liner notes, although Deen Castronovo's playing was featured on the record.

Biscuits participated in a special concert held on December 28, 1994, to honor the lifetime achievements of his brother Ken, who had died earlier in the year of a drug overdose.

=== Death Hoax ===
On October 27, 2009, a blogger named James Greene Jr. who claimed to have been in recent contact with Biscuits posted a report on his blog announcing that the drummer had died on October 24 of throat cancer. This report quickly circulated to multiple media sources, but was soon questioned by Biscuits' friends and family as a hoax. That evening, Biscuit's sister-in-law e-mailed Greene to confirm that the musician was still alive. Biscuits himself never released a statement concerning the death hoax, and Greene would later argue that Biscuits was entirely responsible for the false report.

== Equipment ==
Biscuits used Pro-Mark DC-10 marching sticks to drum. His drumkit at the beginning of Danzig was a black Premier Resonator, though he switched to a chrome covered 1970s era Ludwig Classic maple kit for Danzig II, and continued with that kit to record and tour for Danzig III and Danzig IV. Biscuits was usually seen using Zildjian cymbals. His regular ride cymbal sound during his work with Danzig was a Zildjian 22" Earth Ride. Biscuits also favored Paiste Rude cymbals. He used medium and rock ride cymbals as crashes. Biscuits' mainstay snare with Danzig was a Sonor steel model, though he also used a Ludwig piccolo snare.

With D.O.A. and Black Flag, Biscuits used an older blonde maple Slingerland kit and was also photographed using various colored Ludwig drums. For Social Distortion, Biscuits used a Boom Theory kit, including a Bridgedeck snare built by Al Adinolfi.

== Discography ==
=== D.O.A. (1978–1982) ===
- Disco Sucks
- The Prisoner
- Triumph of the Ignoroids
- World War III
- Vancouver Complication
- Something Better Change
- Hardcore '81
- Let Them Eat Jellybeans!
- Positively D.O.A. (No God, No Country, No Lies)
- Rat Music for Rat People Vol. 1
- Bloodied But Unbowed
- War on 45 (partial)
- 1978 (2019 2-LP single CD compilation featuring rare Biscuits performances)

=== Black Flag (1982) ===
- 1982: The Complete 1982 Demos Plus More (bootleg album)
- 2010: Live at the On Broadway 1982 (live album)

=== Circle Jerks (1983–1984) ===
- Repo Man (soundtrack)
- The Best of Flipside Video

=== Floorlords (1986) ===
- Black Ice Ride 2-Nite

=== Glenn Danzig and the Power and Fury Orchestra ===
- 1987: Less than Zero soundtrack

=== Danzig (1987–1994) ===
- 1988: Danzig
- 1990: Danzig II: Lucifuge
- 1992: Danzig III: How the Gods Kill
- 1993: Thrall-Demonsweatlive
- 1994: Danzig 4
- 2001: Live on the Black Hand Side
- 2007: The Lost Tracks of Danzig

=== Run-D.M.C. ===
- 1988: Tougher Than Leather (drum tracks only)

=== Samhain ===
- 1990: Final Descent

=== Social Distortion (1996–1999) ===
- 1998: Live at the Roxy
