= Thrall-Demonsweatlive =

EP by Danzig
- Released: May 25, 1993
- Recorded: October 31, 1992 [Live tracks]; January 1993 [Studio tracks]
- Venue: Irvine Meadows Amphitheatre
- Studio: Hollywood Sound Recorders
- Genre: Heavy metal
- Length: 31:39
- Label: Def American
- Producers: Glenn Danzig, Rick Rubin

Danzig chronology
Danzig III: How the Gods Kill (1992)	Thrall-Demonsweatlive (1993)	Danzig 4 (1994)

Professional ratings
Review scores
Source	Rating
AllMusic	2.5/5 stars
College Music Journal	(favorable)
Spin Alternative Record Guide	4/10

Thrall-Demonsweatlive is the first EP by American heavy metal band Danzig. It was released in 1993 on Def American Recordings and has been certified Gold.

== Music and recording ==
The EP is split into two sections. The first section, Thrall, consists of three new studio recordings that were tracked live and completed by the band in a single day. The studio recording "Trouble" is a cover of the Elvis Presley song featured in the movie King Creole. The band had performed this song in its earliest live shows. Additionally, Glenn Danzig had previously recorded the song with Samhain, which was later released on the box set version of their Final Descent EP. Notably, Eerie Von performed on that version as well.

The second section, Demonsweatlive, includes four live recordings taken from the band's Halloween 1992 performance at the Irvine Meadows Amphitheater in California.

From the fourth pressing on, the CD releases have a hidden track featuring the remixed studio version of "Mother", titled "Mother '93". Symbolically, the song is hidden at track number 93, and the total length of the blank tracks leading to the song is 7 minutes and 6 seconds (6 minutes and 66 seconds).

== Artwork and packaging ==
The cover artwork is by artist Simon Bisley. The EP was issued as a picture-disc CD and LP in Europe. Like Danzig's four studio albums with the original lineup, this EP was given a Parental Advisory label despite the absence of common profanity.

== Music videos ==
Music videos were released for the songs "Mother '93" and "It's Coming Down".

The "Mother '93" music video was a success on MTV. As a result, "Mother" became Danzig's most well known song; its popularity helping both the EP and the band's debut album to reach Gold status in 1994, and later Platinum status.

The uncensored version of the "It's Coming Down" music video was banned by music channels, including MTV, due to its sexually explicit content. The music video depicts various acts of bondage, sadomasochism, and cock and ball torture. The video was directed by Jon Reiss and features an appearance by performance artist Bob Flanagan, both known for their video work with Nine Inch Nails. Eerie Von explained the concept behind the music video: "It was part of mine and Glenn's personalities, part of what we used to see when we lived in New York. The director also had some good ideas, and we let him do what he wanted. I like stuff that people think is bizarre. It was pretty heavy, but so what? Sexually, you're either open minded or you're not."

All music videos from the album are featured on Danzig's Archive de la Morte DVD.

== Track listing ==
- Thrall:
1. "It's Coming Down" – 3:35
2. "The Violet Fire" – 4:58
3. "Trouble" (Elvis Presley cover) – 3:23
- Demonsweatlive:
4. "Snakes of Christ" – 4:17
5. "Am I Demon" – 4:21
6. "Sistinas" – 4:04
7. "Mother" – 3:35
8. "Mother '93" – 3:23

All songs written by Glenn Danzig, except "Trouble" by Jerry Leiber and Mike Stoller.

== Credits ==
- Glenn Danzig – vocals, guitar, keyboards
- Chuck Biscuits – drums
- John Christ – guitar
- Eerie Von – bass

=== Production ===
- Producers – Glenn Danzig, Rick Rubin
- Engineer – Bruno Tattaglia
- Mastering – Stephen Marcussen
- Artwork – Simon Bisley
- Photography – Mark Leialoha
- Design – Dirk Walter
