= Shatraug =

Ville Pystynen
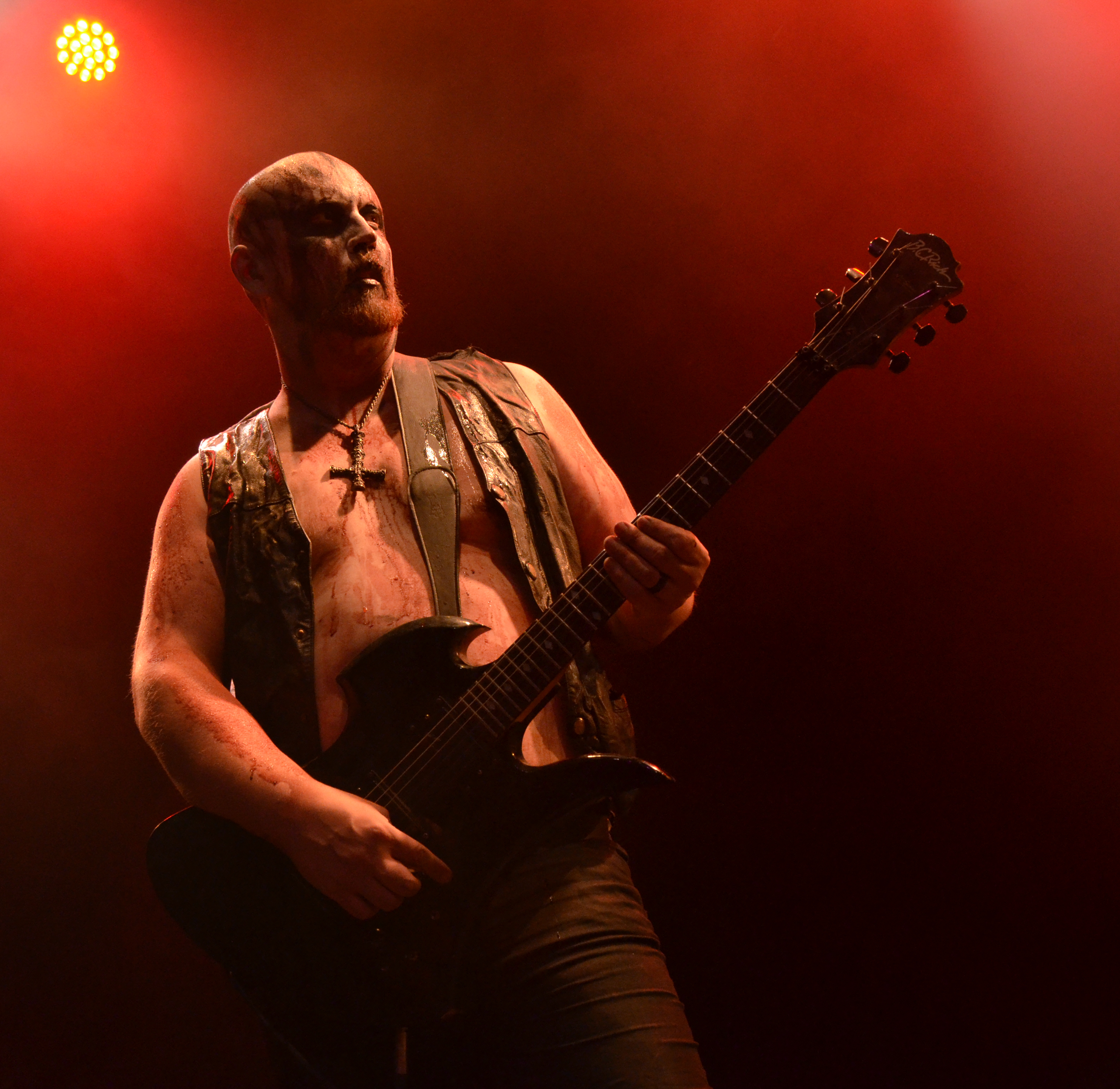
- Shatraug in 2014

Background information
- Also known as: Shatraug, Hellseeker, Malice Pooper, Ghoul, Fornicator, Skaldi Shatraug
- Born: Ville Petteri Pystynen; Finland
- Genres: Black metal; Death metal; Grindcore; Doom metal; Thrash metal
- Occupation: Musician
- Instruments: Guitar; vocals; bass guitar; keyboards; drums
- Years active: 1993–present
- Labels: Grievantee Productions; Hammer of Hate

Ville Petteri Pystynen, also commonly known by his main stage name, Shatraug, is a Finnish-born musician. In 1994, he formed the Finnish black metal band Horna. Besides Horna, Pystynen has played in several bands of different genres of metal. He founded and has played bass and guitar for Sargeist since 1999. He is also known for playing bass and guitar for Behexen from 2004 to 2015. Pystynen also has several solo and smaller projects which, in some, he plays all instruments and sings for.

Pystynen has a wide interest in playing instruments, being a live session musician, as well as writing lyrics. He is also trained in programming, mixing and engineering music. He owned and ran Grievantee Productions, and Warmoon Records. Ville also owns his own recording studio.

Pystynen is said to be inspired by Quorthon and has stated that Bathory has a massive influence on Horna's existence. He has also said to be inspired by bands such as Beherit, Impaled Nazarene, Emperor and Darkthrone. Pystynen has been criticized for NSBM ties.

== Work as a lyricist ==
Pystynen writes most of Horna's lyrics in Finnish with many recurring themes. Apart from usual black metal themed lyrics, some of the lyrics on early Horna albums were about fantasy and the works of J. R. R. Tolkien. For example, Kohti Yhdeksän Nousua (Towards Rising of the Nine) refers to Tolkien's ring wraiths, and 'A Ring to Rule' (which is uncommonly written in English) from the 1999 EP Perimä Vihassa Ja Verikostossa, regards the One Ring.

According to Shatraug, a large record label approached Horna and attempted to negotiate with them to join their label. Pystynen refused, however, as the label wanted them to use more lyrics in English.

== Personal life ==
Pystynen was conscripted for Finnish military service in 2000. He was kicked out for being violent toward a commanding officer.

He is married, and is the father of two children.

== Discography ==
Horna

- Kohti Yhdeksän Nousua (1998), Solistitium Records
- Haudankylmyyden Mailla (1999), Solistitium Records
- Sudentaival (2001), Woodcut Records
- Envaatnags Eflos Solf Esgantaavne (2005), Woodcut Records
- Ääniä Yössä (2006), Moribund Records
- Sotahuuto (2007), Moribund Records
- Sanojesi Äärelle (2008), Debemur Morti Productions / Deviant Records
- Musta Kaipuu (2009), Debemur Morti Productions
- Askel lähempänä Saatanaa (2013), World Terror Committee
