= Samhain (box set) =

Box set by Samhain
- Released: June 20, 2000
- Recorded: 1983–1990
- Genres: Deathrock, horror punk
- Labels: Evilive; E-Magine
- Producer: Glenn Danzig

Samhain chronology
Final Descent (1990)	Samhain (2000)	Samhain Live '85–'86 (2001)

Professional ratings
Review scores
Source	Rating
AllMusic	2/5 stars
Metal Hammer	7/10
Punknews.org	4.5/5 stars

The self-titled box set of American deathrock band Samhain was released in 2000, more than 13 years after the band effectively ceased recording and performing. The set's five CDs and one VHS tape compile nearly all of the band's original catalog, newly remastered from the original master tapes, as well as previously unreleased material, the latter of which includes a live CD and a VHS video cassette of live footage.

Of Samhain's previous official releases, only the original mix of the Unholy Passion EP was not included in the boxed set; conjecture is that the original master tapes had been lost over the years, or were erased when Danzig re-recorded the guitar and some vocal tracks to those songs in June 1987 for eventual release as side B of the original Final Descent.

== Special packaging ==
The outer box cover was painted by Martin Emond, who had previously provided artwork for singer Glenn Danzig's post-Samhain band, Danzig, and comic book company Verotik. Within the box, each of the five CDs came in its own "mini-LP" sleeve (unlike the jewel-cases used for the individual CD reissues the following year). Also included was a 32-page booklet of photographs and reprinted lyrics to Discs One and Three.

The boxed set was advertised as "a $75 value, all for just $59.95", and is now out of print. If pre-ordered online through distributor E-Magine Music's website, the first pressing of the boxed set was shipped two weeks prior to the street date, with the first 1,000 packaged with an "internet exclusive" bonus metal pin of the "scarecrow beast" character that appeared on Samhain T-shirts in the 1980s (similar to the one on the cover of the November-Coming-Fire album).

Second pressings of the boxed set omitted the bonus pin, but included "the previously unreleased Samhain comic book" by Mr. Monster creator Michael T. Gilbert (with four uncredited pages by Sean Wyett, who also illustrated Danzig for the back cover of the Misfits' Legacy of Brutality). The "contents" listing on the back of the box was modified to reflect the comic's inclusion. Some boxed sets were reportedly shipped with both the bonus metal pin and the comic.

== Track listing ==
Initium (disc 1)
No.	Title	Length
1.	"Initium / Samhain"	3:39
2.	"Black Dream"	2:00
3.	"All Murder All Guts All Fun"	2:44
4.	"Macabre"	2:12
5.	"He Who Can Not Be Named"	1:38
6.	"Horror Biz"	2:41
7.	"The Shift"	3:08
8.	"The Howl"	2:50
9.	"Archangel"	5:12

Unholy Passion (disc 2)
No.	Title	Length
1.	"Unholy Passion"	3:10
2.	"All Hell"	2:19
3.	"Moribund"	1:43
4.	"The Hungry End"	3:06
5.	"Misery Tomb"	3:24
6.	"I Am Misery"	3:40

Front cover for November-Coming-Fire (1986)

Samhain III: November-Coming-Fire (disc 3)
No.	Title	Length
1.	"Diabolos '88"	1:24
2.	"In My Grip"	2:44
3.	"Mother of Mercy"	3:09
4.	"Birthright"	2:10
5.	"To Walk the Night"	2:11
6.	"Let the Day Begin"	2:36
7.	"Halloween II"	3:15
8.	"November's Fire"	2:47
9.	"Kiss of Steel"	1:29
10.	"Unbridled"	1:48
11.	"Human Pony Girl"	4:57

Final Descent (disc 4)
No.	Title	Length
1.	"Night Chill"	2:15
2.	"Descent"	4:23
3.	"Death... in Its Arms"	2:54
4.	"Lords of the Left Hand"	3:05
5.	"The Birthing"	3:29
6.	"Twist of Cain"	4:17
7.	"Possession"	3:44
8.	"Trouble"	3:19
9.	"Lords of the Left Hand: 2nd Version"	2:41

Samhain Live '85–'86 (disc 5)
No.	Title	Length
1.	"All Hell"	2:29
2.	"Samhain"	1:47
3.	"The Shift"	2:50
4.	"The Howl"	2:45
5.	"Unholy Passion"	3:32
6.	"All Murder, All Guts, All Fun"	3:37
7.	"I Am Misery"	4:18
8.	"The Hungry End"	3:37
9.	"Horror Biz"	3:23
10.	"He-Who-Can-Not-Be-Named"	1:35
11.	"Black Dream"	2:24
12.	"Death Comes Ripping"	2:06
13.	"Mother of Mercy"	3:38
14.	"To Walk the Night"	2:06
15.	"Halloween II"	3:28
16.	"In My Grip"	2:44
17.	"London Dungeon"	2:43
18.	"Archangel"	3:25

- Tracks 1–10: Live February 19, 1985, at Danceteria, New York, NY
- Tracks 11–18: Live April 13, 1986, at the Cabaret Metro, Chicago, IL

Live VHS
No.	Title	Length
1.	"All Murder, All Guts, All Fun"	2:22
2.	"The Shift"	2:44
3.	"Unholy Passion"	3:14
4.	"Black Dream"	2:17
5.	"The Hungry End"	3:02
6.	"I Am Misery"	3:32
7.	"Horror Biz"	2:20
8.	"Moribund"	2:18
9.	"All Hell"	2:28
10.	"London Dungeon"	2:36
11.	"Archangel"	3:22
12.	"Mother of Mercy"	3:06
13.	"To Walk the Night"	2:06
14.	"Samhain"	1:20
15.	"Moribund"	1:53
16.	"Black Dream"	2:22

- Tracks 1–8 recorded April 13, 1985, at Typographer's Hall, Baltimore, MD
- Tracks 9–13 recorded April 13, 1986, at the Cabaret Metro, Chicago, IL
- Tracks 14–16 recorded July 14, 1986, at The Ritz, New York, NY

== Notes ==
- Disc two marks the first time the remixed Unholy Passion EP was presented as a single CD on its own, though the contents had been added to the first CD pressing of Initium in 1987, and again to the original Final Descent in 1990. The original mix of the EP has never been released on CD, apart from unofficial/illegal bootlegs which are sourced from vinyl and cassette.
- Eerie Von has confirmed that "Death... in Its Arms" was recorded during the sessions for Danzig's second album, Danzig II: Lucifuge, and features the full original Danzig lineup: Glenn Danzig, Eerie Von, John Christ, and Chuck Biscuits.
- The title of "Death... in Its Arms" is misspelled on all releases (with an incorrect apostrophe in "it's").
- "Lords of the Left Hand (2nd Version)" was actually recorded in September 1986, while the "original version" was not recorded until September 1987, and was not mixed in its final form until 1990. Presumably the original version was written earlier, later rearranged to the 2nd version, which then ended up being recorded first.
- Tracks 4 and 5 of Samhain III: November-Coming-Fire are incorrectly reversed on the CD sleeve. The correct order is listed above.
- Tracks 7 and 9 of Final Descent are incorrectly reversed on the CD sleeve. The correct order is listed above.
