= List of Reagan Youth band members =

The following is a complete chronology of the various line-ups of punk rock music group Reagan Youth. Reagan Youth formed in New York, NY in 1980, became inactive in 1990, and had reformed in 2006, thirteen years after the death of lead singer and co-founder Dave Rubinstein. Co-founder Paul "Cripple" Bakija continued performing until his death in 2024.

Reagan Youth line-ups
(1980–1981)	Dave Rubinstein – vocals; Paul Bakija – guitar; Andy Bryan – bass; Charlie Bonet – drums	four-song demo
(1981–1982) Rehearsal only	Dave Rubinstein – vocals, rehearsal drums; Paul Bakija – guitar; Al Pike – bass
(1982)	Dave Rubinstein – vocals; Paul Bakija – guitar; Al Pike – bass; Charlie Bonet – session drums	"Reagan Youth" and "New Aryans" studio recordings for unreleased comp
(1982–1984) Classic (best-selling) lineup	Dave Rubinstein – vocals; Paul Bakija – guitar; Al Pike – bass; Steve Weissman – drums	unreleased eight-track studio recordings; Youth Anthems for the New Order 12"; Volume 1 LP; Live & Rare CD (live tracks)
(1984–1985)	Dave Rubinstein – vocals; Paul Bakija – guitar; Victor Dominicis – bass; Rick Griffith – drums
(1985–1988)	Dave Rubinstein – vocals; Paul Bakija – guitar; Victor Dominicis – bass; Javier Madriaga – drums
(1988–1989)	DISBANDED
(1989) Recording only	Dave Rubinstein – vocals; Paul Bakija – guitar; Victor Dominicis – bass; Javier Madriaga – drums
(1989–1990) Recording only	Dave Rubinstein – vocals; Paul Bakija – guitar, bass; Javier Madriaga – drums	Volume 2 LP
(1990–2006)	DISBANDED
(2006–2010)	Pat McGowan – vocals; Paul Bakija – guitar; Al Pike – bass; Javier Madriaga – drums
(2010–2011)	Kenny Young – vocals; Paul Bakija – guitar; Al Pike – bass; Mikey “thunderstix” Sabatino (Michael Wildwood) – drums
(2011)	Kenny Young – vocals; Paul Bakija – guitar; Dave Manzullo – bass; Mikey “thindersocks”Sabatino (michael wildwood)– drums
(2011–2012)	Jim Pepe – vocals; Kenny Young -vocals/bass; Paul Bakija – guitar; Dave Manzullo – bass; Mikey Sabatino (Michael Wildwood)– drums
(2012–2015)	Trey Oswald – vocals; Paul Bakija – guitar; Tibbie X – bass; Stig Whisper – drums
(2015)	Jeff Penalty – vocals; Paul Bakija – guitar; Tibbie X – bass; Rick Contreras – drums
(2016)	A.J. Delinquent - vocals; Paul Bakija - guitar; Tibbie X - bass; Rick Contreras – drums
(2016 - 2018)	Max Motherfucker - vocals; Spike Polite - vocals; David Luna - vocals; Paul Bakija - guitar; Tibbie X - bass; Björn - drums; Vince Sollecito – drums; Kevin Knuckles - drums
(2019-2021)	Neil Patterson – vocals; Paul Bakija – guitar; Tibbie X – bass; Charlie Bonet – drums
(2022 - 2023 )	Stza – vocals; Paul Bakija – guitar; Tibbie X – bass; Charlie Bonet – drums; Mark Zapata - drums
