= Sargeist =

Finnish black metal band

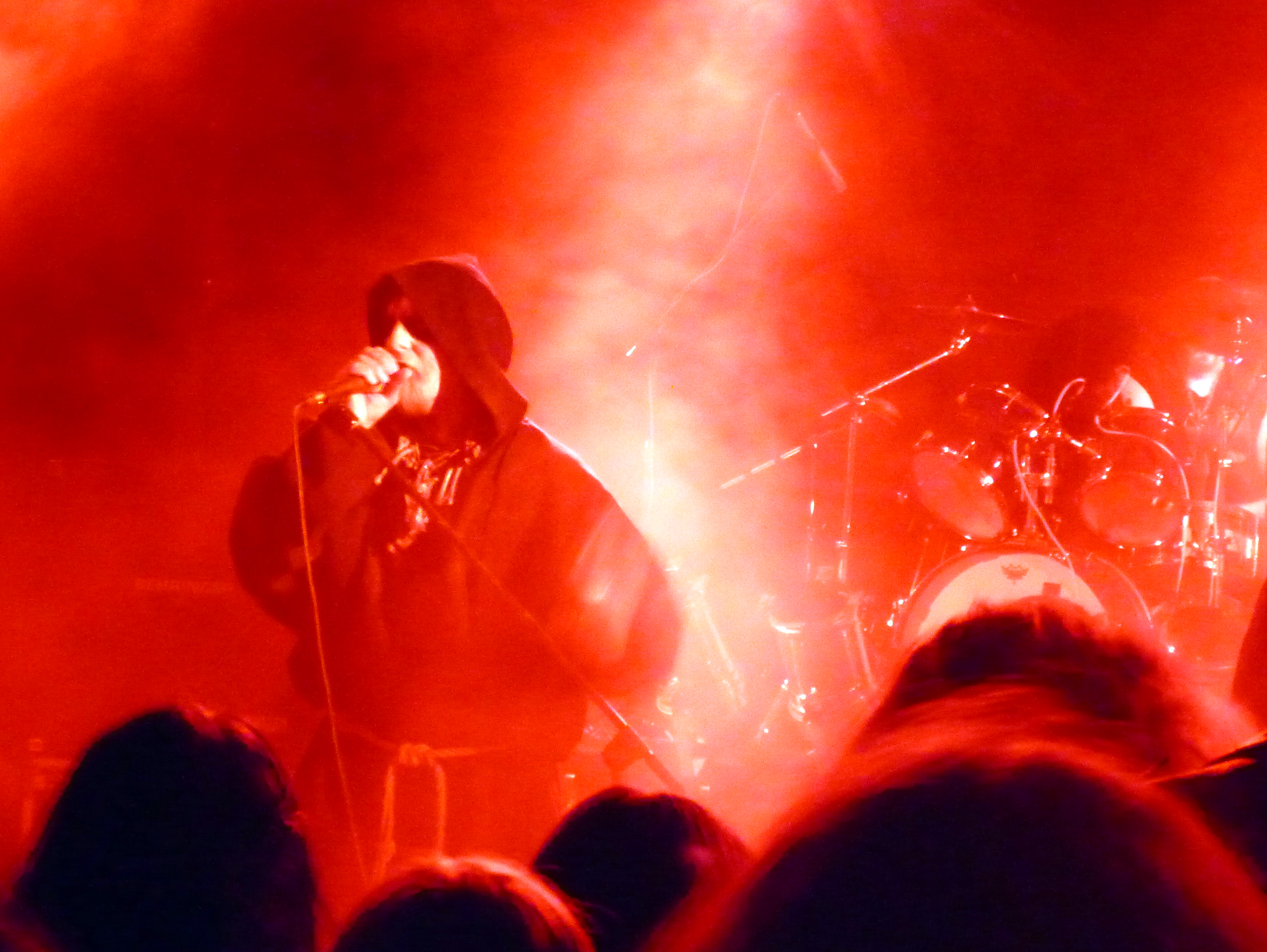
- Hoath Torog from Finnish black metal band Sargeist

Background information
- Origin: Lappeenranta, Finland
- Genre: Black metal
- Years active: 1999–present
- Labels: World Terror Committee; Moribund Records
- Members: Shatraug; Spellgoth; Nur-i-siyah
- Past members: Hoath Torog; Horns; Vainaja; VJS; Abysmal; Gruft; Profundus

Sargeist is a Finnish black metal band formed in 1999. Originally a solo project by Shatraug of Finnish black metal act Horna, other members have joined, and subsequently left, since 2000. After the demo Tyranny Returns (2001), Hoath Torog and Horns, both from Finnish black metal outfit Behexen, joined the line-up, which remained stable until 2016.

Sargeist stays close to Scandinavian "old school" black metal. Lyrics deal with Satanism and anti-Christian blasphemy, as well as darkness, depression, misanthropy and hate. The band's name combines the German words, "sarg" (coffin) and "geist" (spirit, ghost), and derives from Rotting Christ's song "The Old Coffin Spirit". All members use pseudonyms.

MetalSucks stated that their 2010 album, Let the Devil In, was "one of the most important black metal records that wasn’t put out in the 90s."

== Members ==
Current members

- Shatraug (Ville Pystynen) – guitar (1999–present), vocals (1999–2001, 2024–present), bass (1999–2008)
- Spellgoth (Tuomas Rytkönen) – bass (2024–present)
- Nur-i-siyah (Álvaro G. S.) – drums (2024–present)

Former members

- Lord Volos – drums (2000)
- Gorsedd Marter – guitar (2001)
- Makha Karn – drums (2001)
- Hoath Torog (Marko Saarikalle) – vocals (2002–2016)
- Horns (Jani Rekola) – drums (2002–2016)
- Vainaja (Perttu Pakkanen) – bass (2009–2016)
- VJS – guitar (2014–2026)
- Abysmal (Marko Hirvonen) – bass (2016–2023)
- Gruft (Roni Sahari) – drums (2016–2023)
- Profundus (Markus Tuonenjoki) – vocals (2016–2023)

== Discography ==
Year	Title	Type
1999	Nockmaar	Demo
2000	Heralding the Breath of Pestilence	Demo
2001	Tyranny Returns	Demo
2002	Reaping with Curses and Plague	Single (split with Merrimack)
2003	Satanic Black Devotion	Studio album
2004	Wraith Messiah	Single (split with Temple of Baal)
2004	In Ruin and Despair	(EP) (split with Horned Almighty)
2004	Sargeist & Funeral Elegy	(EP) (split with Funeral Elegy)
2005	Funeral Curses	Compilation album
2005	Disciple of the Heinous Path	Studio album
2006	Dead Ravens Memory	Single (split with Bahimiron)
2008	The Dark Embrace	(EP)
2010	Let The Devil In	Studio album
2011	Lair of Necromancy	(EP)
2013	The Rebirth of a Cursed Existence	Compilation album
2014	Feeding the Crawling Shadows	Studio album
2018	Unbound	Studio album
2019	Death Veneration	(EP)
2020	Black Devotion Will Let the Devil In	Boxed set
2022	Transcendental Black Magic	(EP) (split with Serpent Noir)
2024	Sargeist Trilogy	Boxed set
2025	Flame Within Flame	Studio album
