= A Collection of Pop Classics =

Compilation album by Reagan Youth
- Released: July 22, 1994
- Recorded: 1984, 1990
- Genre: Punk rock, hardcore punk
- Length: 60:09
- Label: New Red Archives

Reagan Youth chronology
Volume 2 (1990)	A Collection of Pop Classics (1994)	Volume III (2025)

Alternate cover art
- 2007 reissue as Punk Rock New York.

Professional ratings
Review scores
Source	Rating
Allmusic	4.5/5 stars
Punknews	5/5 stars

A Collection of Pop Classics is an album by American hardcore punk band Reagan Youth. It was released after the break-up of the band in 1989 and the suicide of lead singer Dave Rubinstein in 1993. The record is a compilation of the band's two studio albums, Volume 1 and Volume 2. The compilation was reissed in 2007 with the title Punk Rock New York, with one fewer song.

== Track listing ==
Source: Last.fm, Allmusic

No.	Title	Length
1.	"Reagan Youth"	1:16
2.	"New Aryans"	1:17
3.	"(Are You) Happy?"	1:33
4.	"No Class"	1:34
5.	"I Hate Hate"	2:00
6.	"Degenerated"	2:22
7.	"Go Nowhere"	1:22
8.	"USA"	1:23
9.	"Anytown"	2:00
10.	"In Dog We Trust"	2:50
11.	"It's A Beautiful Day"	3:53
12.	"Jesus Was A Communist"	1:44
13.	"Urban Savages"	1:23
14.	"What Will The Neighbors Think?"	3:50
15.	"Get The Ruler Out"	2:25
16.	"Brave New World"	4:30
17.	"Miss Teen America"	2:46
18.	"Heavy Metal Shuffle"	4:38
19.	"Queen Babylon"	5:12
20.	"Acid Rain"	1:55
21.	"One Holy Bible"	6:33
22.	"Back to the Garden (Parts I-IV)"	4:05

== Personnel ==
- Dave Rubinstein – vocals (all tracks)
- Paul Bakija – guitar (all tracks); bass (tracks 11–22)
- Al Pike – bass (tracks 1–10)
- Steve Weinstein – drums (tracks 1–10)
- Javier Madriaga – drums (tracks 11–22)
