= Reagan Youth =

American band

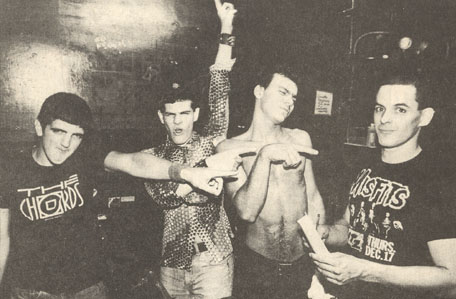

Background information
- Origin: New York City, US
- Genre: Hardcore punk • anarcho-punk
- Years active: 1980–1990, 2006–2024
- Labels: R Radical, Cleopatra, New Red Archives
- Members: List of Reagan Youth band members

Reagan Youth was an American anarcho-punk band formed by singer Dave Rubinstein (Dave Insurgent) and guitarist Paul Bakija (Paul Cripple) in Queens, New York City in early 1980.

== History ==
=== Initial career (1980–1990) ===
David Rubinstein and Paul Bakija met in Russell Sage Junior High School and together attended Forest Hills High School, the same high school Simon and Garfunkel and the Ramones attended when they began. After rehearsals under the name Pus with a varying rhythm section, the group changed its name to Reagan Youth shortly before playing its first gig on August 22, 1980, with bassist Andy Bryan (Andy Apathy) and drummer Charlie Bonet (Charlie Tripper). Reagan Youth quickly gained a following and were soon playing the punk clubs of Manhattan. Bakija's physics teacher at FHHS attended a Queens basement rehearsal. And he then attended a show at CBGB's; where once he had his head shaved; he became associated with the band at times hauling Paul's amps and equipment into the city from Queens in his Dodge Dart. After the band recorded a four-song demo in 1981, Bryan was replaced by Al Pike. Bonet departed soon after; after the band briefly rehearsed with Rubinstein filling in on drums, Steve Weissman joined full-time. They signed to the R Radical imprint.

After graduation and the release of their first record, the seven-song Youth Anthems for the New Order, they began touring nationally and were regulars at the Sunday afternoon hardcore matinee shows at CBGB. In 1984, prior to a significant US tour, Pike and Weissman left the group, with Pike going on to join a formative version of Glenn Danzig's group Samhain briefly around this time. They were replaced by Victor Dominicis (Vic Venom) and Rick Griffith (Rick Royale) respectively. Griffith was later replaced in 1985 by Javier Madriaga (Johnny Aztec), who has also played drums in Lujuria, A.P.P.L.E., and Heart Attack.

By the late 1980s the extensive touring had taken its toll on the group. Despite the many shows played and the relatively large album sales for a hardcore punk band, they continually found themselves broke. After Ronald Reagan left office in 1989, the band split up. Despite their decision to disband, the group attracted the attention of the burgeoning punk label New Red Archives, with whom they signed a two-album deal. New Red Archives first re-released Youth Anthems for the New World Order with three additional outtakes as the Volume 1 LP. In 1990, Bakija (playing both guitar and bass), Madriaga, and Rubinstein recorded a final album, Volume 2.

=== Post-breakup (1990–2006) ===
Dominicis went on to play guitar in Nausea while Bakija, Madriaga, and Rubinstein continued making music together, briefly performing in a psychedelic rock group called House of God that was derailed by Rubinstein's increasing drug and health problems. House of God recorded a seven-song demo, an unmixed version of which can be found online.

By 1990 Rubinstein had become a heroin user and occasional dealer. In a conflict with another dealer, he was severely beaten with a baseball bat, requiring weeks of hospitalization. In 1993 he began dating Tiffany Bresciani, who supported both of their drug habits by prostitution. This same year, Rubinstein's mother was killed in a car accident. Soon after, he and Bresciani were on Houston Street looking for customers and drugs. A familiar customer in a truck hired Bresciani and the two of them disappeared. A few days later, police on Long Island stopped the same truck and discovered Bresciani's slain body in the back. The driver was Joel Rifkin, later convicted as a serial killer responsible for the murder of several sex workers. Despondent over his continuing drug addiction and the loss of his girlfriend and mother, Rubinstein committed suicide shortly thereafter. This same year, New Red Archives issued A Collection of Pop Classics, which collected both Volume 1 and Volume 2 on a single CD.

In 1998, New Red Archives released Live & Rare, a CD compiling highlights from New York City-area Reagan Youth sets from the early 1980s with the Pike/Weissman lineup, along with tracks from the band's initial demo and a brief demo for Volume 2. Pike and New Red Archives owner Nicky Garratt, also the guitarist for the British band the UK Subs, contributed liner notes for this release. In 2002, plans for a reunion set at CBGB featuring Bakija, Bryan and Bonet were shattered by Bryan's sudden, fatal heart attack.

=== Reformation (2006–2024) ===
In 2006, founding member, guitarist Paul Bakija reformed Reagan Youth with original members Al Pike (bass) and Javier "Johnny Aztec" Madriaga (drums), alongside new vocalist Pat McGowan (a.k.a. Pat Distraction). Initially intended as a one-off performance, the reunion soon “took on a life of its own,” with the band continuing to perform locally and regionally.

In August 2007, they launched the Resurrection Tour with Boston hardcore band Mouth Sewn Shut. Between 2008 and 2009, Reagan Youth toured internationally, including shows in Germany, Belgium, and across Europe.

After McGowan's departure in early 2010, the band was inactive for about a year. They reemerged in late 2010 with a new lineup: Kenny Young on vocals, Mike Sabatino on drums, and Dave Manzullo on bass (replacing Pike due to health concerns). In 2011, the band released the digital-only single "Lucky 7." Soon after, Jim "Diesel" Pepe replaced Young, and Tibbie X joined as bassist, becoming a consistent member alongside Bakija.

Lineup changes continued over the following years. Paul Rye succeeded Diesel on vocals. Drummer Mike Sabatino was later replaced by Felipe Torres, who brought in students Stig Whisper (drums) and Trey Oswald (vocals). After Oswald abruptly left mid-performance in Vancouver, the group briefly included Jeff Penalty (formerly of Dead Kennedys) on vocals and Rick Contreras on drums, followed by A.J. DeFeo on vocals.

Bakija continued writing material for a third studio album and performed with various vocalists and drummers, including Spike Polite, Kevin Knuckles, Vince Solecito, Charlie Bonet, David Luna, Neil Patterson, and Scott "Stza" Sturgeon of Leftöver Crack. Tibbie X remained a constant member on bass throughout this period.

In 2019, Cleopatra Records released "Punk Rock Christmas," Reagan Youth's first original song since Volume II.

In 2023, Bakija began work on Volume III, a concept album about the life of late frontman Dave Insurgent. He was joined by vocalist Madame St. Beatrice and drummer Mark Zapata. The album was completed in 2024 while Bakija was in hospice at Calvary Hospital.

Bakija died of cancer on September 21, 2024. Volume III was released posthumously on February 28, 2025, via Cleopatra Records.

== Music ==
=== Lyrical content ===
Reagan Youth utilized Ku Klux Klan and Nazi Party imagery for satirical effect. In their original 1980s incarnation, they sought to address the parallels between the policies of Ronald Reagan, the Christian Right and American conservatism, and the beliefs of the hate groups. Their self-titled song, "Reagan Youth", uses a tongue-in-cheek rhetoric to draw parallels between Young Republicans who rallied to the cause of Ronald Reagan, and the Hitler Youth of Nazi Germany, ushering in an era of songs about Ronald Reagan in American punk music. The band expressed its left-wing politics through irony, using images from hate groups for their album/CD covers.

=== Musical style ===
Musically, the band was firmly rooted in the early hardcore/punk crossover tradition, but moved deeper into waters uncharted by their punk rock contemporaries as their career progressed. While their 1983 debut is an accomplished work squarely in keeping with hardcore punk convention, their 1990 followup features dense guitar work replete with solos and overdubs, diversified tempos and several sonic experiments, leading it to draw comparisons to Black Sabbath and 1970s album-oriented rock.

== Band members ==
Former members

- Dave Rubinstein – vocals (1980–1990; died 1993)
- Paul (Cripple) Bakija – guitars (1980–1990, 2006–2024; his death)
- Andy Bryan – bass (1980–1981; died 2002)
- Charlie (Tripper) Bonet – drums (1980–1982, 2019–2021)
- Al Pike – bass (1981–1984, 2006–2011)
- Steve Weissman – drums (1982–1984)
- Victor Dominicis – bass (1984–1990)
- Rick Griffith – drums (1984–1985)
- Javier Madriaga – drums (1985–1990, 2006–2010)
- Pat McGowan – vocals (2006–2010)
- Kenny Young – guitars, vocals (2010–2012; died 2014)
- Jim "Diesel" Pepe – vocals (2011–2012)
- Dave Manzullo – bass (2011–2012)
- Mikey “thundersocks” Sabatino – (Michael wildwood) drums (2010–2012)
- Tibbie X – bass (2012–2024)
- Felipe Torres – drums (2012–2013)
- Trey Oswald – vocals (2012–2015)
- Stig Whisper – drums (2013–2015)
- Jeff Penalty – vocals (2015)
- Rick Contreras – drums (2015–2016)
- A.J. Delinquent – vocals (2016)
- Max M. – vocals (2016)
- Björn – drums (2016)
- Kevin Knuckles – drums (2016–2017)
- David Luna – vocals (2016–2017)
- Spike Polite – vocals (2017–2018)
- Vince Sollecito – drummer (2017–2019)
- Neil Patterson – vocals (2019–2021)
- Scott Sturgeon – vocals (2022–2023)
- Mark Zapata – drums (2022–2024)

== Discography ==
Reagan Youth released only one album, Youth Anthems for the New Order, during their existence as a band (in 1984). It was re-released wth 3 additional tracks as Volume 1 by the independent label New Red Archives in 1990. This album eventually sold 40,000 copies. A second album, titled Volume 2, was released in 1990. Both are still available on vinyl, as well as a CD titled A Collection of Pop Classics that combines both records. A collection of live recordings was issued in 1998 as Live and Rare. During the band’s reformation years, Cleopatra Records released the Reagan Youth original song “Punk Rock Christmas” in 2019, marking the group’s first new material since Volume 2. In 2025, the label released Volume III, a concept album based on the life of frontman Dave Insurgent.

=== Studio albums ===
- Youth Anthems for the New Order (1984)
- Volume 2 (1990)
- Volume III (2025)

=== Compilation albums ===
- Volume 1 (1990)
- A Collection of Pop Classics (1994)
- The Complete Youth Anthems for the New Order (2016)

=== Bootlegs ===
- Live at CBGBs August 7, 1982
- Live at CBGBs November 20, 1982 (Ratcage Records Benefit)
- Live at CBGBs Vol. One 7"

== Appearances ==
- Hardcore Breakout USA (1990)
- Hardcore Breakout USA Volume 2 (1995)
- The Punk, The Bad & The Ugly (1997)
- At War With Society (1998)
- At War With Society II (1999)
- Mighty Attack (1999)
- Robot Dreams (2023) – soundtrack appearance
- Airheads (1994) – soundtrack
- Shameless, Season 8, Episode 7 – song "USA" (2017)
- Mr. Mercedes, Season 1, Episode 9 – song "U.S.A." (2017)
- Mr. Mercedes, Season 1, Episode 9 – song "Happy? (Are You)" (2017)
- Mr. Mercedes, Season 1, Episode 9 – song "Urban Savages" (2017)
- Mr. Mercedes, Season 1, Episode 9 – song "Anytown" (2017)
- Mr. Mercedes, Season 1, Episode 9 – song "Acid Rain" (2017)
- Stranger Things, Season 1, Episode 2 – song "Go Nowhere" (2016)
- Agents of S.H.I.E.L.D., Season 3, Episode 3 – song "Go Nowhere" (2015)
- Justified, Season 1, Episode 1 – song "USA" (2010)
- Fierce People (2005) – songs "USA" and "In Dog We Trust"
- The Frozen Ground (2013) – song "Heavy Metal Shuffle"
- Gang Land (1998) – songs "Go Nowhere", "Degenerated", "New Aryans"
- Home Sweet Hoboken (2000) – song "Go Nowhere"
- Forget About Us (2017) – short film – song "Jesus Was a Communist"
- Mom and Dad (2017) – songs "Anytown" and "Urban Savages"
- The Godfathers of Hardcore (2017) – song "Degenerated"
- Deadly Class (2018) – episode "Reagan Youth" – song "I Hate Hate"
- Airheads (1994) – soundtrack – song "Degenerated"

== See also ==
- Ronald Reagan in music
