= Goatfucking Gent/Vivicomburium =

EP by Horna
- Released: 2005
- Genre: Black metal
- Length: 39:19
- Label: Obscure Abhorrence Productions

Horna chronology
Horna/Blackdeath split (2005)	Goatfucking Gent/Vivicomburium (2005)	Horna/Tenebrae In Perpetuum split (2005)

Goatfucking Gent/Vivicomburium is a split EP by the black metal band Horna. It was released on Obscure Abhorrene Productions in 2005. It was limited to 738 copies.

== Track listing ==
Horna

1. "Mustasiipinen" – 4:43
2. "Vihasta ja arvista" – 4:44
3. "Sinulle, mätänevä Jehova" – 6:04
4. "Örkkivuorilta" – 4:15

Kerberos

1. "Burning Black Vomit" – 3:15
2. "Baphomet's Acolytes" – 4:56
3. "Death's Prophet" – 4:59
4. "The Holocaust of Man's Destruction" – 3:21
5. "Satanas (Sarcófago cover)" – 3:02
