= Nightside Emanations =

Studio album by Behexen
- Released: 21 September 2012
- Recorded: Recorded in Tampere, Finland in the spring of 2012.
- Genre: Black metal, death metal
- Length: 49:25
- Label: Debemur Morti Productions

Behexen chronology
My Soul for His Glory (2008)	Nightside Emanations (2012)	The Poisonous Path (2016)

Nightside Emanations is the fourth studio album by Behexen. The album was released through Debemur Morti Productions on 21 September 2012. Nightside Emanations features changes in the band's musical sound, this time incorporating more traditional death metal mixed with their traditional black metal sound. In addition, the vocals have drastically changed, as the high-pitched shrieks heard on the early albums are now replaced by lower deathlike growls. The track "We Burn With Serpent Fire" contains a guest guitar solo by former Behexen guitarist Gargantum.

== Track listing ==
No.	Title	Length
1.	"Intro"	1:13
2.	"Wrathful Dragon Hau-Hra"	4:05
3.	"Death's Black Light"	3:33
4.	"Circle Me..."	5:41
5.	"We Burn with Serpent Fire"	6:17
6.	"Luciferian Will"	5:13
7.	"Awaken Tiamat"	6:08
8.	"Temple of the Silent Curses"	5:24
9.	"Shining Death"	4:37
10.	"Kiss of Our Dark Mother"	7:14
Total length:		49:25

== Personnel ==
- Hoath Torog - vocals, lyrics
- Shatraug - guitar
- Wraath - guitar
- Horns - drums

=== Additional personnel ===
- Gargantum - guest guitars on "We Burn With Serpent Fire"
- Christophe Szpajdel – logo
