= Horna / Behexen =

Horna/Behexen

EP by Behexen and Horna
- Released: 2004; February 5, 2007
- Recorded: Behexen: Fantom Crypt; January 3, 2003; March 1, 2003; Horna: Boneyard; February 2004
- Genre: Black metal
- Length: 39:50
- Label: Grievantee, Autistiartili, Debemur Morti

Behexen chronology
By the Blessing of Satan (2004)	Horna/Behexen (2004)	From the Devil's Chalice (2008)

Horna chronology
Black Metal Warfare (2004)	Horna/Behexen (2004)	Vuohipaimen (2004)

Alternative cover

Professional ratings
Review scores
Source	Rating
Allmusic	(not rated, no review) link

Horna/Behexen is a split EP by the black metal bands Horna and Behexen. It was first released in 2004 on vinyl by Grievantee Productions and was limited to 500 copies. The CD version was released by Autistiartili Records and was limited to 1000 copies on. It was later re-released on February 5, 2007 through Debemur Morti Productions with different artwork.

== Track listing ==
No.	Title	Artist	Length
1.	"Näkyjen Tuhkasta"	Horna	4:59
2.	"Rautamyrsky"	Horna	4:20
3.	"Kätketyn Jumaluuden Vartija"	Horna	5:13
4.	"Verta Koirille"	Horna	3:31
5.	"Ritual of Flesh & Blood"	Behexen	7:01
6.	"Beyond The Shadow of My Lord"	Behexen	6:30
7.	"A Distant Call From Darkness"	Behexen	8:16

== Personnel ==
=== Behexen ===
- Torog – vocals
- Gargantum – guitars
- Horns – drums

=== Horna ===
- Corvus – vocals
- Shatraug – guitar, vocals
- Mynni Luukkainen – bass guitar
- Gorthaur – drums

=== Additional personnel ===
- Christophe Szpajdel – Behexen and Horna logos
