= Unholy Passion =

EP by Samhain
- Released: 1985, 1986, 2000
- Recorded: October–December 1984, 1987
- Genres: Deathrock, horror punk
- Length: 17:22
- Labels: Plan 9; E-Magine
- Producer: Glenn Danzig

Samhain chronology
Initium (1984)	Unholy Passion (1985)	November-Coming-Fire (1986)

Unholy Passion is the first EP and second overall release by American deathrock band Samhain, Glenn Danzig's band after the disbanding of the Misfits. According to bassist Eerie Von in his photographic book Misery Obscura, the album was "a departure from our first release: more underground, more tribal. A step back further into the darkness". The song "All Hell" is a re-recorded version of the Misfits' "All Hell Breaks Loose".

The original 12" vinyl EP was pressed twice: once on black vinyl and the classic tan cover, and then again in 1986, on both red and black vinyl (with a maroon sleeve) and white vinyl (with tan cover).

In 1987, Danzig re-recorded the guitar and some vocal tracks for the songs, removing the original work done by Pete "Damien" Marshall. The recordings were given new mixes and, with the addition of "Misery Tomb", were released as part of Final Descent in 1990. The remixed versions were released as a standalone CD for the first time as part of the Samhain box set in 2000 and as an individual CD in 2001.

== Track listing ==
All tracks are written by Glenn Danzig.

Side A
No.	Title	Length
1.	"Unholy Passion"	3:10
2.	"All Hell"	2:19

Side B
No.	Title	Length
1.	"Moribund"	1:43
2.	"The Hungry End"	3:06
3.	"I Am Misery"	3:40

2000 box set CD release
No.	Title	Length
1.	"Unholy Passion"	3:10
2.	"All Hell"	2:19
3.	"Moribund"	1:43
4.	"The Hungry End"	3:06
5.	"Misery Tomb"	3:24
6.	"I Am Misery"	3:40

== Personnel ==
- Glenn Danzig – vocals, guitar
- Pete "Damien" Marshall – guitar
- Eerie Von – bass
- Steve Zing – drums

Technical:

- Cr – cutting

=== Tracks 1–6 ===
- See Unholy Passion
- Glenn Danzig - vocals, guitar, keyboards
- Eerie Von - bass
- Steve Zing - drums

Technical:

- Cr - Cutting
- Bob Allecca - engineer
- Martin Schmelze - engineer (remix engineer)
