= Sanoj =

Sanoj, variantly spelt Sanoja, Sunoj and Sunjo, is an Indian Hindu name of Sanskrit origin that is a samaasa of the words sannyasa (abandonment) and jataah (born of), literally meaning born of abandonment. It may refer to:

- Sanojesi Äärelle, a studio album by the Finnish band Homa
- Sunjo of Joseon, the 23rd king of the Korean Joseon Dynasty
