= Hiidentorni / Perimä Vihassa Ja Verikostossa =

Compilation album by Horna
- Released: 2000
- Genre: Black metal
- Length: 2:05:04
- Label: Woodcut Records

Horna chronology
Horna / Musta Surma (2000)	Hiidentorni / Perimä Vihassa Ja Verikostossa (2000)	Sudentaival (2001)

Hiidentorni / Perimä Vihassa Ja Verikostossa is a compilation by the black metal band Horna. It was released on Woodcut Records in 2000.

== Track listing ==
Disc 1

1. Avaus / Kun Lyömme Jumalan Kodin Liekkeihin 05:39
2. Hiidentorni Huokuu Usvansa 04:31
3. Ikuisesti, Kalpeina Kuoleman Muistoina 05:14
4. Tappakaa Kristus 02:50
5. Sanoista... Pimeyteen 02:42
6. Hänen Synkkä Myrskynsä 08:05
7. Hornanväki 06:20
8. Sinulle Mätänevä Jehova 04:48
9. Örkkivuorilla 04:01
10. Imperial Devastation 05:36
11. Sword Of Darkness 04:45
12. White Aura Buried In Ashes 04:52
13. Sormus Ja Silmä 13:07

Disc 2

1. Pimeys Ylla Pyhan Maan 04:11
2. Verikammari 06:30
3. Ghash Inras 05:15
4. Perimä Vihassa Ja Verikostossa 07:56
5. Korpin Hetki 03:36
6. Ihmisviha 03:10
7. Kun Synkka Ikuisuus Avautuu 03:26
8. Black Metal Sodomy 02:15
9. Ordo Regnum Sathanas 16:15
