= Rosemary's Babies =

American hardcore punk band

Background information
- Origin: Lodi, New Jersey
- Genres: Hardcore punk
- Years active: 1980–1983
- Label: Ghastly Records
- Past members: J.R. Post Mortem; CA Richie; Eerie Von

Rosemary's Babies was an American hardcore punk band formed in Lodi, New Jersey in 1980. Its members included J.R.(Vincent C Paladino) - vocals, Post Mortem (Robert Montena) - bass, CA Richie (Craig Richardson) - guitar, and Eerie Von (Eric Stellman) - drums. The band was active until 1983 and produced a 7-inch EP titled "Blood Lust", released on the band's own Ghastly Records. A 2004 CD, Talking to the Dead included tracks from the EP, previously unreleased songs, and tracks recorded live at CBGBs NYC May 15, 1983.

The band's early musical influences included The Misfits and D.C. bands such as Minor Threat, The Bad Brains, and State of Alert (featuring vocalist Henry Rollins) as well as early British Oi! bands like Blitz, Charged GBH and Discharge. Other stylistic influences include films such as A Clockwork Orange, Caligula, and the band's namesake, Rosemary's Baby.

Rosemary's Babies was notably active in the New Jersey and New York hardcore punk scenes of the early 1980s, and all band members continued to work in the music industry after the demise of the band. Eerie Von moved on to work with Glenn Danzig in the bands Samhain and Danzig. In 2008, J.R. worked on the Septimus Orion project. Their first collaboration, a cd entitled CAGED, featured a new version of Sanctioned Violence, which was omitted on the 2004 release of Talking to the Dead because the original master tape of this the song could not be located. The band played numerous live shows, most notably opening for The Misfits, and Scream. Eerie Von and J.R. were among the interviewees for a book titled "This Music Leaves Stains:The Complete Story of the Misfits" written by James Greene Jr. and published in 2013.

== Discography ==
- 1983 - Blood Lust EP 7-inch (Ghastly Records)
- 2004 - Talking To The Dead

== Members ==
- Eerie Von (Eric Stellman) - drums - later of Samhain and Danzig
- Post Mortem (Robert Montena) - bass - later of I'm Afraid
- CA Richie (Craig Richardson) - guitar- member of When I Was Dead
- J.R.(Vincent C Paladino) - vocals - later worked with Septimus Orion
