= Kohti Yhdeksän Nousua =

Kohti Yhdeksän Nousua (Sis. Ordo Regnum Sathanas)

Studio album by Horna
- Released: 1998; December 2006
- Recorded: 1997 at Astia Studio; 2000 at Digibone Studio
- Genre: Black metal
- Length: 32:26
- Label: Solistitium, Blut & Eisen Productions

Horna chronology
Hiidentorni (1997)	Kohti Yhdeksän Nousua (Sis. Ordo Regnum Sathanas) (1998)	Haudankylmyyden Mailla (1999)

Alternative cover
- Vinyl cover

Kohti Yhdeksän Nousua (Finnish for "Towards the Rise of the Nine") is the first full-length studio album by the black metal band Horna. It was released on Solistitium Records in 1998 and was limited to 1500 copies. It was re-released on vinyl under Blut & Eisen Productions in December 2006, with modified artwork, 5 additional tracks recorded in 2000 and the title appended with (Sis. Ordo Regnum Sathanas). It was limited to 666 copies, with the first 100 of which being printed on grey and black vinyl. The cover bears resemblance to Darkthrone's A Blaze in the Northern Sky. The title is a reference to the nine Nazgûl from J. R. R. Tolkien's The Lord of the Rings.

== Track listings ==
=== Original ===
No.	Title	Length
1.	"Örkkivuorilta (English: From the Goblin Mountains or From the Orc Mountains)"	4:00
2.	"Imperial Devastation"	5:36
3.	"Sword of Darkness"	4:45
4.	"White Aura Buried in Ashes"	4:58
5.	"Sormus ja silmä (English: Ring and Eye)"	10:00
6.	"Outro"	3:07

=== Vinyl re-release ===
A side

1. "Örkkivuorilta" (English: From the Goblin Mountains or From the Orc Mountains)
2. "Imperial Devastation"
3. "Sword of Darkness"
4. "White Aura Buried in Ashes"
5. "Korpin Hetki" (English: Raven's Moment)
6. "Black Metal Sodomy"

B side

7. "Sormus Ja Silmä" (English: Ring and Eye)
8. "Kun Lyömme Jumalan Kodin Liekkeihin" (rough English: When We Set God's Home on Fire)
9. "Ihmisviha" (English: Human Hatred)
10. "Ordo Regnum Sathanas"
11. "Distant Blazing Eye (outro)"

== Personnel ==
- Nazgul von Armageddon – vocals
- Shatraug – guitar
- Moredhel (Jyri Vahvanen) – guitar
- Skratt – bass
- Gorthaur – drums

=== Additional personnel ===
- Christophe Szpajdel – logo
