= Rituale Satanum =

Studio album by Behexen
- Released: 2000
- Recorded: July 1999, Astia Studios and Satanic Metal Temple
- Genre: Black metal
- Length: 44:34
- Label: Sinister Figure Records
- Producer: Anssi Kippo

Behexen chronology
Rituale Satanum (2000)	By the Blessing of Satan (2004)

Rituale Satanum is the first full length album by the Finnish black metal band Behexen. Its title is a mockery of the religious text of the Catholic faith, Rituale Romanum.

Remastered & re-released in 2004 (with new artwork) by Dynamic Arts Records. LP released by Faustian Distribution & Northern Heritage in June 2006.

== Track listing ==
- All lyrics by Marko "Hoath Torog" Saarikalle. All music by Jani "Horns" Rekola. Copyright Neo Music.

No.	Title	Length
1.	"Intro - The Summoning (Performed by Nazgul Von Armageddon)"	1:05
2.	"Sota Valon Jumalaa Vastaan"	3:33
3.	"Night of the Blasphemy"	4:46
4.	"Christ Forever Die"	5:31
5.	"Towards the Father"	3:55
6.	"Saatanan Varjon Synkkyydessä"	5:55
7.	"Baphomet's Call..."	5:42
8.	"The Flames of the Blasphemer"	5:44
9.	"Blessed Be the Darkness"	4:21
10.	"Rituale Satanum"	4:02

== Personnel ==
- Hoath Torog: Vocals
- Gargantum: Guitars
- Lunatic: Bass
- Horns: Drums

== Production ==
- Behexen – arranger, recorded by
- Anssi Kippo – producer, recorded by
- Jussi Jauhiainen – recorded by
- Christophe Szpajdel – logo
