= Kinda Country =

Studio album by Eerie Von
- Released: 2009
- Genre: Country, Blues
- Label: Ghastly
- Producer: Eerie Von

Eerie Von chronology
That's All There Is (2006)	Kinda Country (2009)

Kinda Country is an album released by Eerie Von in 2009 on Ghastly Records. It is Eerie Von's fifth album since he left the metal band Danzig. The album is notable for being the first by Eerie Von not to fit into the rock genre, instead featuring a dark country-style sound. The choice of album title was inspired by this fact. Eerie Von first began writing songs from Kinda Country as far back as 1996. As these songs didn't fit in with his gothic rock sound, they remained unrecorded until enough tracks where available for an entire album. Several songs, including "Please Don't Wake Me", "Lonely Me" and "Stop Getting Over You", are about Eerie Von's past relationships.

== Track listing ==
1. "My Liquor" - 2.37
2. "Lay the Blame" - 4.02
3. "SurewoodBfine" - 4.32
4. "The Wagon" - 4.46
5. "It's True" - 4.26
6. "Please Don't Wake Me" - 3.48
7. "The Way That I Am" - 4.08
8. "Lonely Me" - 4.36
9. "Tryin Hard to Forget" - 4.08
10. "Stop, Getting Over You" - 3.27

All songs written, produced and performed by Eerie Von.
