= Ordo Regnum Sathanas =

Compilation album by Horna
- Released: 2004
- Genre: Black metal
- Length: 59:31
- Label: Adversary Productions

Horna chronology
Horna/Ouroboros (2003)	Ordo Regnum Sathanas (2004)	Talismaani (2004)

Ordo Regnum Sathanas is the second compilation by the black metal band Horna. It was released on Adversary Productions in 2004 and was limited to 300 copies.

== Track listing ==
1. Korpin Hetki - 3:36
2. Ihmisviha - 3:10
3. Kun Synkkä Ikuisuus Avautuu - 3:26
4. Black Metal Sodomy - 2:15
5. Ordo Regnum Sathanas 16:15
6. Ring to Rule - 3:01
7. Haudanusva - 3:56
8. Pimeys Yllä Pyhän Maan - 4:11
9. Verikammari - 6:30
10. Ghash Inras - 5:15
11. Perimä Vihassa Ja Verikostossa - 7:56

== Personnel ==
=== Additional personnel ===
- Christophe Szpajdel - logo
