= Al Pike =

American musician (born 1961)

- Born: 1961 (age 64–65); New York City, U.S.
- Genre: Hardcore punk
- Instrument: Bass
- Years active: 1981–1984, 1986-1988, 2006–present
- Label: New Red Archives

Al Pike (born 1961) is an American musician, best known as the bassist of the hardcore punk band Reagan Youth, as well as briefly being a member of Samhain.

== Musical career ==
Pike joined the New York-based political hardcore band Reagan Youth in 1981, becoming their second bassist. He remained in the group until 1984, playing on their debut Youth Anthems for the New Order EP (later re-released as the Volume 1 LP.) During this era, Pike was also involved with Straight Edge Magazine.

In 1983, Pike was included in formative lineups of Glenn Danzig's group Samhain, but due to other commitments, did not last long with the band, appearing only on a single track from the Initium album.

From 1986 thru 1988 Pike was bassist for primary colors, a Long Island-based band that included Steve Weissman from Reagan Youth on drums, John Monahan (SDP, The Press) on guitar and vocalist Chris Fausner.

Following the death of former lead singer Dave Rubinstein, Pike contributed liner notes to Reagan Youth's 1997 Live & Rare archival release, culled mostly from material from his time in the band. In 2006, Pike reformed Reagan Youth with original guitarist Paul Bakija, but again departed the group in 2011.
