= Viha ja Viikate =

EP by Horna
- Released: 2003
- Genre: Black metal
- Length: 15:37
- Label: Woodcut Records

Horna chronology
| Horna / Desolation Triumphalis (2003) | Viha ja Viikate (2003) | Horna/Ouroboros (2003) |

Viha ja Viikate is the ninth EP by the black metal band Horna. It was released on Woodcut Records in 2003. It was then re-released by Obscure Abhorrence Productions on LP format and was limited to 400 copies.

== Track listing ==
1. Viha Ja Viikate - 3:15
2. Ars Laternarum - 4:31
3. Mustasiipinen - 4:18
4. Kun 1000 Kuuta On Kiertänyt - 3:33

== Personnel ==
=== Additional personnel ===
- Christophe Szpajdel - logo
