= Sota (EP) =

EP by Horna
- Released: 1999
- Genre: Black metal
- Length: 14:11
- Label: Sinister Productions

Horna chronology
Haudankylmyyden Mailla (1999)	Sota (1999)	Perimä Vihassa Ja Verikostossa (1999)

Sota (Finnish for "war") is the first EP by the black metal band Horna. It was released on Sinister Productions in 1999 with a limit of 666 copies, though only 200-300 copies are believed to exist. It has not been re-released.

== Track listing ==
No.	Title	Length
1.	"Yhdeksän Yö"	7:42
2.	"Haudankylmyyden Maille"	3:45
3.	"Sota"	2:44

== Personnel ==
=== Additional personnel ===
- Christophe Szpajdel - logo
