= Final Descent =

Final Descent may refer to:

- Final Descent (album), a 1990 album by Samhain
- Final Descent (film), a 1997 television film
- The Final Descent, a horror novel by Rick Yancey
