= Joel Rifkin =

American serial killer (born 1959)

- Rifkin after his arrest
- Born: Joel David Rifkin; January 20, 1959 (age 67); New York City, U.S.
- Other names: Joel the Ripper, The Turtle
- Conviction: Second degree murder (9 counts)
- Penalty: 203 years to life imprisonment

Details
- Victims: 9 convicted and confirmed, 17 suspected.
- Span of crimes: 1989–1993
- Country: United States
- State: New York
- Date apprehended: June 28, 1993
- Imprisoned at: Clinton Correctional Facility

Joel David Rifkin (born January 20, 1959) is an American serial killer who was sentenced to 203 years in prison after being convicted for killing nine women between 1989 and 1993. In total he confessed to murdering 17 women.

== Early life ==
Rifkin's birth parents were both young college students, and his biological father was an Army veteran. On February 14, 1959, when he was three weeks old, Rifkin was adopted by an upper-middle-class non-religious Jewish couple living on Long Island.

Rifkin performed poorly in school due to learning disabilities and was unpopular with classmates. He graduated from East Meadow High School in 1977, then attended classes at Nassau Community College, the State University of New York at Brockport, and the State University of New York at Farmingdale, but left before earning a degree. After leaving college, Rifkin became self-employed as a landscaper.

On February 20, 1987, his adoptive father, Bernard (Ben) Rifkin, died by suicide, overdosing after having suffered from prostate cancer for several months.

On August 22, 1987, Rifkin was arrested during a prostitution sting in Hempstead, New York, after offering an undercover female police officer money for sex.

== Murders ==
Rifkin committed his first murder on February 20, 1989, killing Heidi Balch in her own home in East Meadow. He then dismembered her body, removing her teeth and fingertips, putting her head in a paint can which he left in the woods on a golf course in Hopewell, New Jersey, disposing of her legs further north, and dumping her remaining torso and arms into the East River around New York City. On March 5, 1989, Balch's severed head was discovered on the seventh hole of the golf course. On April 8, 1989, Balch's legs were found in Pequannock Creek near Jefferson Township, New Jersey. Her remains were not identified until 2013.

Rifkin killed 16 more women during the next four years. He was implicated in Balch's murder after his arrest in 1993. Investigators determined in 2013 that Balch and the woman he described as his first victim were synonymous.

Rifkin picked up prostitute Tiffany Bresciani on Allen Street in Manhattan, on June 24, 1993, with her boyfriend, punk rock musician Dave Rubinstein of hardcore punk band Reagan Youth. Bresciani told Rubinstein that she would be returning in 20 minutes. After Bresciani failed to return, Rubinstein called the police with a description of the 1984 Mazda pickup truck that Rifkin drove. Partially as a result of her death, Dave Rubinstein died from suicide by overdose less than two weeks later.

== Arrest and trial ==
On June 28, 1993, at 3:15 am, state troopers patrolling Long Island's Southern State Parkway noticed a 1984 Mazda B2000 pickup truck without a license plate. After indicating to the driver to pull over, he failed to stop and led police on a 20- to 25-minute chase, ending after he lost control of the vehicle and crashed into a light pole. The driver was identified as Joel David Rifkin, and after searching the vehicle, the troopers found the body of Tiffany Bresciani wrapped in a tarpaulin. On May 9, 1994, he was found guilty of second-degree murder for her death.

== Prison life ==
Prison officials decided in 1996 that Rifkin was so notorious that his presence in the general prison population could be disruptive. He was confined to his cell at the Attica Correctional Facility for 23 hours per day. He spent more than four years in solitary confinement, then was transferred to the Clinton Correctional Facility in Clinton County, New York. Rifkin sued, arguing that his solitary imprisonment was unconstitutional. In 2000, a state appellate court determined that prison officials had not violated his constitutional rights by housing him in isolation. Corrections officials said that Rifkin was imprisoned with more than 200 other inmates at Clinton, who were not allowed into the general prison population.

== Known victims ==
Names	Notes
Heidi "Suzie" Balch, 25	Remains found in 1989 in Hopewell Township, Mercer County, New Jersey and the East River. Identified in March 2013.
Julie Blackbird	Remains never found
Barbara Jacobs, 31	Remains found on July 14, 1991, in the Hudson River.
Yun Lee, 31	Remains found on September 23, 1991, in the East River off Randalls Island.
Mary Ellen DeLuca, 22	Remains found on October 1, 1991, in Cornwall, New York. Identified on July 4, 1993.
"Number 6"	Never identified, remains never recovered
"Number 9"	Never identified. Found May 13, 1992 in a 55-gallon steel drum floating in Newtown Creek in Brooklyn.
Anna Lopez, 33	Remains found on May 25, 1992, in Patterson, New York.
Violet O'Neill, 21	Remains found in July 1992 in the Harlem River at 123rd Street, the East River at 23rd Street, and near Governors Island. Identified in September 1993.
Maryann Hollomon, 39	Remains found on July 9, 1992, in Coney Island Creek.
Lorraine Orvieto, 28	Remains found on July 11, 1992, in Coney Island Creek, Brooklyn, New York. Identified on July 4, 1993.
Jenny Soto, 23	Remains found on November 17, 1992, on the shores of Harlem River in the South Bronx.
Mary Catherine Williams, 31	Remains found on December 21, 1992, in Yorktown, New York. Identified on July 6, 1993.
Leah Evens, 28	Remains found on May 9, 1993, in Northampton, Suffolk County, New York.
Iris Sanchez, 25	Remains found on June 29, 1993, near John F. Kennedy International Airport, Queens, New York.
Lauren Marquez, 28	Remains found on June 29, 1993, in the Long Island Central Pine Barrens in Suffolk County, New York. Identified on August 21, 1993.
Tiffany Bresciani, 22	Body found on June 28, 1993, on the floor of Rifkin's pickup truck in Manhattan, New York.
Nicole White	Survived May 1993

Rifkin received his first of many life sentences in June 1994 for Bresciani's murder. In September 1995, Rifkin was sentenced to two life sentences for the murders of Evens and Marquez, to both of which he previously pleaded guilty. Later in December, he received three more life sentences after pleading guilty to murdering Orvieto, Holloman and the unidentified woman found at Newton Creek. In January 1996, Rifkin was given a seventh life sentence for the murder of Soto. That same month, he was sentenced to life again for the murder of Sanchez. In the span of two years, Rifkin racked up a total of eight life sentences.

== In popular culture ==
A 1993 episode of Seinfeld, "The Masseuse", features a character named Joel Rifkin as the boyfriend of Elaine Benes. She begs him to change his name because of its association with the serial killer, but, coincidentally, suggests he choose O. J., seven months before O. J. Simpson was accused of murdering his ex-wife.

== See also ==
- List of serial killers in the United States
- List of serial killers by number of victims
