= Bad Dream No.13 =

Bad Dream No. 13

Studio album by Eerie Von
- Released: January 25, 2005
- Genre: Gothic Rock
- Label: Ghastly
- Producer: Eerie Von

Eerie Von chronology
| The Blood and the Body (1999) | Bad Dream No. 13 (2005) | That's All There Is (2006) |

Bad Dream No. 13 is a gothic rock album released by Eerie Von on January 25, 2005 on Ghastly Records. It is Eerie Von's third album since he left the metal band Danzig. The album was recorded in Eerie Von's home studio over a period of two years.

== Track listing ==
1. "A Cage, is a Cage..." - 3.13
2. "The Bone Drone" - 5.51
3. "In the Shade" - 2.50
4. "Downontheslab" - 5.40
5. "2 Tears in the Bucket" - 4.10
6. "Prelude to Death" - 1.31
7. "Meet Death" - 6.09
8. "Bad Dream" - 4.39
9. "The Perfect Criminal" - 4.02
10. "The Velvet Shroud" - 5.41
11. "Sing, Sinner, Sing!" - 5.48
12. "Case Study #107/Rec. Room 3A" - 3.19
13. "Benediction #2" - 4.04

All tracks written, performed and produced by Eerie Von.
