= By the Blessing of Satan =

Studio album by Behexen
- Released: 2004
- Genre: Black metal
- Length: 47:27
- Label: Woodcut Records

Behexen chronology
Rituale Satanum (2001)	By the Blessing of Satan (2004)	Horna / Behexen (2004)

By the Blessing of Satan is the second full-length album by black metal band Behexen.

== Track listing ==
No.	Title	Length
1.	"By the Blessing of Satan"	4:25
2.	"Fist of the Satanist"	7:43
3.	"Sieluni Saatanan Vihasta Roihuten"	6:36
4.	"Celebration of Christ's Fall"	5:42
5.	"Black Metal Baptism"	7:16
6.	"Watchers of My Black Temple"	8:26
7.	"Under the Eye of Lord"	7:17

== Personnel ==
- Hoath Torog - vocals, lyrics
- Gargantum - guitar
- Veilroth - guitar
- Lunatic - bass
- Horns - drums

== Additional personnel ==
- Christophe Szpajdel – logo
