= SpiderCider =

American punk rock band

SpiderCider is an American punk rock project from goth/punk/hardcore/metal veteran Eerie Von. Eerie Von has recorded one album under this name, That's All There Is, released by Ghastly Records in 2006. The project marked a diversion from the gothic rock of Eerie Von's previous solo albums.
