= That's All There Is =

Studio album by Eerie Von
- Released: 2006
- Genre: Punk rock
- Label: Ghastly
- Producer: Eerie Von

Eerie Von chronology
Bad Dream No.13 (2005)	That's All There Is (2006)	Kinda Country (2009)

That's All There Is a punk rock album by Eerie Von. Von wrote, performed, recorded and produced the album by himself. It was released in 2006 by the label Ghastly Records. That's All There Is was Von's fourth album since he left the metal band Danzig. The album was recorded in Eerie Von's home studio and marked a diversion from the gothic rock of his previous solo albums. It is the only album to be released under the Spidercider name.

== Track listing ==
All tracks written, performed and produced by Eerie Von.

1. "That's All There Is" - 3.09
2. "Without You" - 3.26
3. "Hey Louisa" - 3.57
4. "Its Too Bad" - 2.50
5. "Whatcha Gonna Do?" - 3.36
6. "Ohnonothimagain" - 3.52
7. "Gone Away" - 4.22
8. "Undo-Redo" - 4.00
9. "Nothin Better To Do" - 3.33
10. "Never Again" - 4.32
