= Sotahuuto =

Studio album by Horna
- Released: November 6, 2007
- Recorded: January 2005, October 2006
- Genre: Black metal
- Length: 36:26
- Label: Grievantee, Deviant, Moribund

Horna chronology
Horna/Peste Noire (2007)	Sotahuuto (2007)	Sanojesi Äärelle (2008)

Professional ratings
Review scores
Source	Rating
Allmusic	(?)

Sotahuuto (Finnish for "battle cry" or "war cry") is the sixth studio album by the Finnish black metal band Horna. It was released on November 6, 2007 by Grievantee Productions on CD, by Deviant Records on vinyl, which were limited to 500 copies, and by Moribund Records. The album was a tribute to Bathory and was written in spring 2004.

== Track listing ==
1. "Lähtölaukaus" – 5:01 (English: The Starting Shot)
2. "Vapise, Vapahtaja" – 4:23 (English: Quiver, Saviour)
3. "Verimalja" – 4:19 (English: Chalice of Blood)
4. "Tuhontuoja" – 4:57 (English: Bringer of Destruction)
5. "Sodanjano" – 4:54 (English: Thirst for War)
6. "Ukkosmarssi" – 3:02 (English: March of Thunder)
7. "Sotahuuto" – 3:19 (English: Battle Cry / War Cry)
8. "Vihanlietsoja" – 3:49 (English: Hatemonger)
9. "Tulikäsky" – 2:42 (English: Commandment of Fire)

== Personnel ==
- Corvus – vocals
- Shatraug – guitar
- Sargofagian – drums

=== Additional personnel ===
- Christophe Szpajdel – logo
