= Samhain Live '85–'86 =

Live '85–'86

Live album by Samhain
- Released: 2000, 2001 (re-release)
- Recorded: 1985–1986
- Genre: Deathrock, horror punk
- Length: 52:28
- Label: Evilive; E-Magine
- Producer: Glenn Danzig

Samhain chronology
Samhain Box Set (2000)	Live '85–'86 (2000)	Samhain Live 1984 at the Stardust Ballroom (2005)

Alternative cover

Professional ratings
Review scores
Source	Rating
AllMusic	2/5 stars

Live '85–'86 is a live album by American deathrock band Samhain. It was first released as part of the Samhain Box Set in a "mini-LP" sleeve in September 2000, then on its own in a jewel case in 2001 with either an orange or a red cover. The initial pressing with the "orange blood" cover is printed slightly off-center, cutting off part of the "86" in the title.

== Track listing ==
No.	Title	Length
1.	"All Hell"	2:29
2.	"Samhain"	1:47
3.	"The Shift"	2:50
4.	"The Howl"	2:45
5.	"Unholy Passion"	3:32
6.	"All Murder, All Guts, All Fun"	3:37
7.	"I Am Misery"	4:18
8.	"The Hungry End"	3:37
9.	"Horror Biz"	3:23
10.	"He-Who-Can-Not-Be-Named"	1:35
11.	"Black Dream"	2:24
12.	"Death Comes Ripping"	2:06
13.	"Mother of Mercy"	3:38
14.	"To Walk the Night"	2:06
15.	"Halloween II"	3:28
16.	"In My Grip"	2:44
17.	"London Dungeon"	2:43
18.	"Archangel"	3:25

- Tracks 1–10: Live February 19, 1985, at Danceteria, New York City
- Tracks 11–18: Live April 13, 1986, at the Cabaret Metro, Chicago IL

== Personnel ==
- Glenn Danzig – vocals
- Eerie Von – bass
- Pete "Damien" Marshall – guitar
- Steve Zing – drums (tracks 1–10)
- London May – drums (tracks 11–18)

Technical

- Tom Baker – Mastered By
