= Eerie Von =

American bassist (born 1964)

- Born: Eric Stellmann; August 25, 1964 (age 62); New Jersey, U.S.
- Genres: Gothic rock; heavy metal; horror punk; blues; country
- Occupations: Musician, photographer
- Instruments: Bass guitar, drums, vocals
- Label: Ghastly
- Formerly of: Danzig; Samhain; Rosemary's Babies; Misfits

Eerie Von (born Eric Stellmann; August 25, 1964) is an American musician and photographer best known as the original bassist for the heavy metal band Danzig. His preferred bass is the Fender Jazz Bass.

== Early life ==
Eerie Von was raised in Lodi, New Jersey. As a child he gained an interest in drawing and art. He grew up listening mostly to Elvis Presley and 1950s rock and roll music. Eerie Von began playing the drums and taking lessons at 8 years old. He attended Lodi High School with future Misfits guitarist Doyle, who introduced Eerie Von to the punk rock music of the Misfits. It was in high school that he assumed "Eerie" as his nickname.

== Career ==
=== Rosemary's Babies and Misfits ===
Eerie Von became interested in photography in 1978. He would later strike a friendship with Glenn Danzig and the Misfits, becoming the band's photographer in 1981. Eerie Von was the drummer for the hardcore punk band Rosemary's Babies from 1980 to 1983, recording drums on the Blood Lust EP and the Talking to the Dead compilation album. Eerie Von was once asked to join the Misfits as a drummer, but declined, choosing to remain with Rosemary's Babies. Although never an official Misfits member, in 1986, Eerie Von performed bass and drums on several tracks which eventually appeared on the band's Collection II compilation album in 1995. Eerie Von's close association with the Misfits led to him providing the liner notes to the Misfits box set in 1996.

=== Samhain and Danzig ===
After the Misfits broke up, Eerie Von and Glenn Danzig discussed forming a new band and began rehearsing together. This would lead to Eerie Von becoming the original drummer for Danzig's band Samhain, before quickly switching to bass guitar after being shown how to play the songs by Glenn Danzig. He remained with Samhain from 1983 to 1987, recording on the albums Initium, November-Coming-Fire and Final Descent, and also the Unholy Passion EP. Samhain then changed their name to Danzig, who he played bass with from 1987 to July 1995, appearing on the albums Danzig, Lucifuge, How the Gods Kill and 4, and also the Thrall-Demonsweatlive EP.

=== Solo ===
Eerie Von currently works as a solo performer. He released the instrumental album Uneasy Listening in 1996. He followed this with two gothic rock albums, 1999's The Blood and the Body and 2004's Bad Dream No.13. In 2006, he released the punk rock album That's All There Is. The dark country-style album Kinda Country followed in 2009. Eerie Von also formed the short-lived blues rock band, Bighouse, along with former Danzig soundman Rick Dittamo. Eerie Von has had much underground success with his "Fiend Art", which showcases his disturbing themes on canvas. Misery Obscura, a book compiling photographs taken by Eerie Von throughout his career, was released in 2009. In January 2010, Eerie Von performed an acoustic set at Generation Records in New York City with Lyle Preslar and Mike D'Antonio in support of Misery Obscura. Eerie Von was the co-host for Under the Gun with Candy Gunn, a weekly radio show broadcast on Radio Free Nashville, from its inception in 2012 until July 2013. Eerie Von is currently planning to release a new book and documentary, both titled Misery Perfectum, and he is working on a sixth solo album.

In 2024, Eerie Von released the album Not 4 Nuthin, through Eerie Von Records.The album is not available through streaming and can only be purchased in CD format by contacting him directly.

== Discography ==
=== Rosemary's Babies ===
- 1983: Blood Lust EP
- 2004: Talking to the Dead

=== Misfits ===
- 1995: Collection II (Some songs either featured overdubs by, or were entirely recorded by, Glenn Danzig and Eerie Von)
- 1996: Misfits Box Set

=== Samhain ===
- 1984: Initium
- 1985: Unholy Passion EP
- 1986: November-Coming-Fire
- 1990: Final Descent
- 2000: Samhain Box Set
- 2001: Samhain Live '85–'86

=== Danzig ===
- 1988: Danzig
- 1990: Danzig II: Lucifuge
- 1992: Danzig III: How the Gods Kill
- 1993: Thrall-Demonsweatlive
- 1994: Danzig 4
- 2001: Live on the Black Hand Side
- 2007: The Lost Tracks of Danzig

=== Solo ===
- 1996: Uneasy Listening (with Mike Morance)
- 1999: The Blood and the Body
- 2004: Bad Dream No.13
- 2006: That's All There Is (as SpiderCider)
- 2009: Kinda Country
- 2024: Not 4 Nuthin'

=== Others ===
- 1998: The Black Bible by Various Artists (Contributed the track "Cinerarium Waltz")
- 2000: The Darkest Millennium (A Gothic, Industrial, and Synth Pop Collection) by Various Artists (Contributed the track "An Investment in Hate")
- 2000: Darken My Fire: A Gothic Tribute To The Doors by Various Artists (Contributed the track "The Spy")
- 2001: Darker Shade of Goth by Various Artists (Contributed disc one)
- 2005: Pledge Your Allegiance...To Satan! by Various Artists (Contributed the tracks "The Bone Drone" and "One or Two")
- 2015: "Swamp Ass" by Justify These Scars (does coarse vocals)
