= Uneasy Listening (Eerie Von album) =

Studio album by Eerie Von
- Released: 1996
- Genre: Gothic rock, instrumental
- Label: Caroline Records
- Producer: Eerie Von & Mike Morance

Eerie Von chronology
Uneasy Listening (1996)	The Blood and the Body (1999)

Uneasy Listening is an album released by Eerie Von and Mike Morance in 1996 on Caroline Records. Primarily an instrumental album, it was Eerie Von's first recording after leaving Danzig in 1995. The album features a variety of instruments, including harpsichord, piano, and sampled sounds. The vocals on "Half a Gurl (Is Better than None)" are by Mike Morance.

== Track listing ==
1. "Cinerarium Waltz" - 3.27
2. "Nightmare" - 3.20
3. "Runnin' Scared" - 1.54
4. "Misery's Drag" - 3.17
5. "The Witches Lament" - 3.31
6. "Half a Gurl (Is Better than None)" - 4.07
7. "The Dark Sleep" - 3.42
8. "Into the Light" - 3.20

All songs written, produced and performed by Eerie Von and Mike Morance.
