= Behexen =

Finnish black metal band

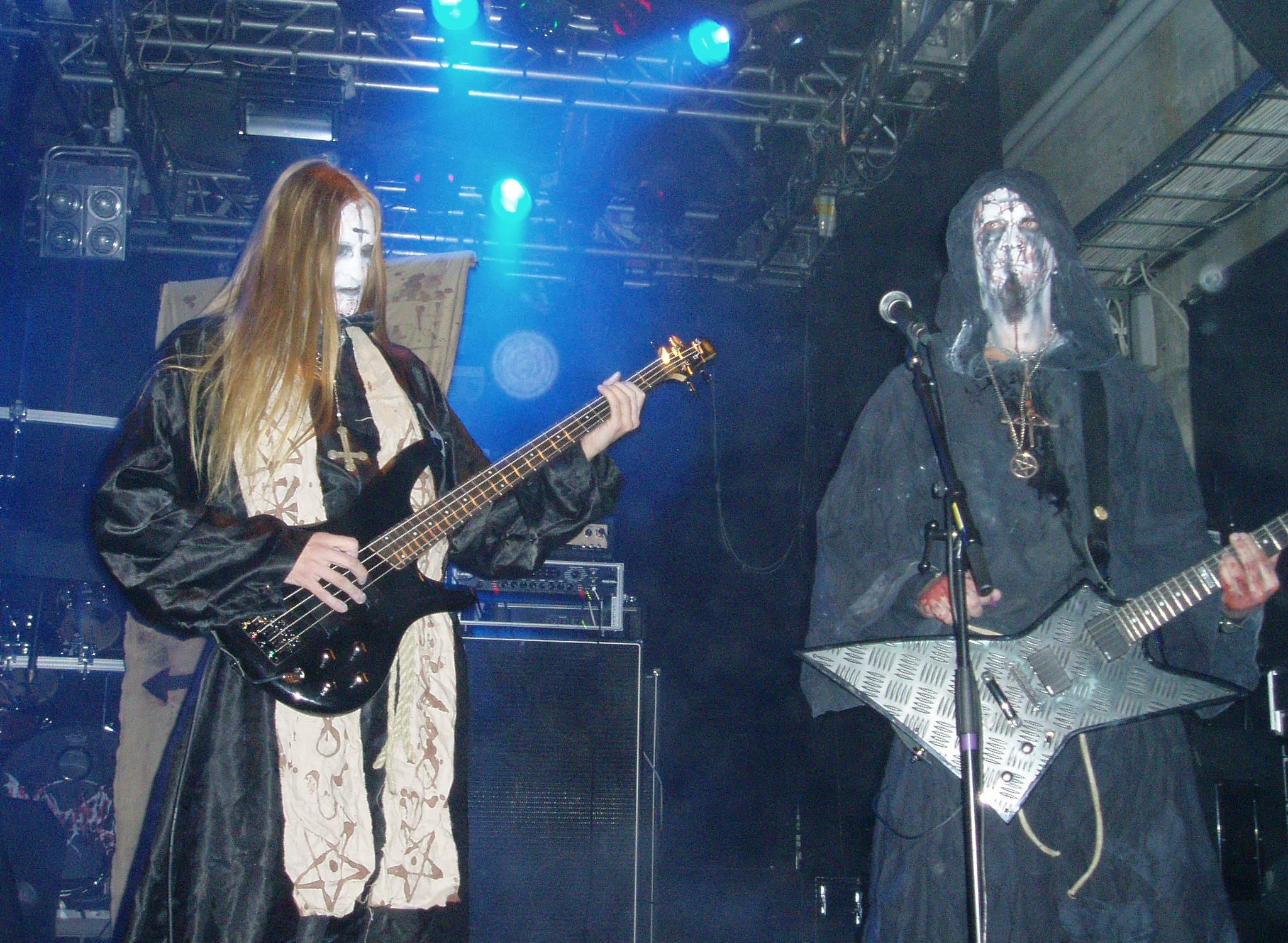
- Behexen at Nosturi 20 November 2009

Background information
- Also known as: Lords of the Left Hand (1994–1996)
- Origin: Hämeenlinna / Tampere, Finland
- Genre: Black metal
- Years active: 1994–present
- Labels: Woodcut Records, Dynamic Arts Records, Grievantee Productions, Sinister Figure Records, Hammer of Hate
- Members: Horns; Hoath Torog; Wraath; Infection; Evisc
- Past members: Reaper; Lunatic; Veilroth; Gargantum; Lord Sargofagian; Shatraug
- Website: kolumbus.fi/anniina.sade/HTML//

Behexen is a Finnish black metal band founded in 1994. They adopted a traditional black metal approach by incorporating raw characteristics. Their first album, Rituale Satanum, was released in 2000, and followed by By the Blessing of Satan in 2004. They released a split with Horna (12-inch LP limited to 500 and CD 1000 copies) and a 3-vinyl set From the Devil's Chalice (limited to 666 copies).

Behexen toured Europe in 2005, supporting Archgoat.

Behexen played old-school black metal until 2012’s Nightside Emanations, which was a stylistic shift. The vocals are now mostly lower-pitched death-like growls as opposed to the earlier high-pitched shrieks, though they use elements of the earlier black metal sound, such as blastbeats and tremolo picking, resulting in a blackened death metal sound.

== Satanic ideology and influences ==
Behexen adopts satanic lyrics and imagery. Vocalist and lyricist Hoath Torog identifies himself as a satanist. Torog explained in an interview following the release of their album Nightside Emanations, "Behexen is a magical tool and channel formed in 1995, which brings the voices of our gods to be heard, and works as an intermediary for their destructive emanations on this world. Our journey has taken nearly twenty years, and has included many phases, but today our temple shines the light of our lord brighter than ever before." Regarding Behexen's influences, Hoath stated that everything "esoteric and exoteric that surrounds us can inspire us. Books, religions, magic, death, music...All the things that we hear, see and experience can feed our inspiration. I get influences from my own life and experiences amongst the occult. Black magic is a comprehensive part of my life, so it's natural that my inspiration comes from there."

Behexen's original name, Lords of the Left Hand, was inspired by a Samhain song of the same name.

== Discography ==
=== Albums ===
- Rituale Satanum (2000)
- By the Blessing of Satan (2004)
- My Soul for His Glory (2008)
- Nightside Emanations (2012)
- The Poisonous Path (2016)

=== Demos and EPs ===
- 1995: Reality Is in Evil...
- 1997: Eternal Realm
- 1998: Blessed Be the Darkness
- 2004: Behexen & Horna
- 2008: Behexen & Satanic Warmaster
- 2009: From the Devil's Chalice

== Band members ==
=== Current members ===
- Horns - Drums (1994–present)
- Hoath Torog - Vocals (1994–present)
- Wraath - Guitars (2009–present)
- Infection - Live Guitars (2009, 2016–2018), Guitars (2018–present)

=== Live musicians ===
- Evisc - Bass (2013–present)

=== Former members ===
- Reaper – Guitars, Bass (1994–1999, 2004–2009)
- Lunatic – Bass (1999–2004)
- Veilroth – Guitars (1999–2004)
- Gargantum – Guitar (1998–2009)
- Lord Sargofagian – Bass (2009-2013)
- Shatraug – Bass (2004-2008), Guitars (2009-2015)
