= Moribund =

Moribund refers to a literal or figurative state near death.

Moribund may refer to:

- Moribund (album), a 2006 album by the Norwegian black metal band Koldbrann
- "Le Moribond", a song by Jacques Brel known in English as "Seasons in the Sun"
- Moribund language, a language likely to become extinct without intervention
- Moribund Oblivion, a Turkish black metal band from Istanbul
- Moribund Records, a heavy metal record label
- "Moribund the Burgermeister", a 1977 song by British progressive rock musician Peter Gabriel
- "Impromptu in Moribundia", a 1939 novel by British playwright and novelist Patrick Hamilton

== See also ==
- Near Death Experience (disambiguation)
