= Final Descent (album) =

Studio album by Samhain
- Released: October 31, 1990
- Recorded: September 1986 – July 1990
- Studios: Reel Platinum Studios, Lodi, New Jersey
- Genres: Deathrock, horror punk,
- Length: 33:32
- Labels: Plan 9; Caroline
- Producer: Glenn Danzig

Samhain chronology
November-Coming-Fire (1986)	Final Descent (1990)	Samhain Box Set (2000)

Professional ratings
Review scores
Source	Rating
AllMusic	3/5 stars
Kerrang!	4/5 stars

Final Descent is the third and final studio album by American deathrock band Samhain, first released in 1990, more than three years after lead singer Glenn Danzig and bassist Eerie Von had recruited guitarist John Christ and drummer Chuck Biscuits to form Danzig.

== Original release ==
Tracks 1–5 are previously unreleased songs, at least some of which had been intended for the Samhain Grim album before it was aborted when the band changed its personnel, and finally its name, to Danzig. Tracks 6–11 had been released in 1987 on the first pressing of the Initium CD. These songs were in fact overdubbed (partially re-recorded) and remixed versions of those on the 1985 Unholy Passion E.P.

Eerie Von has confirmed that "Death...In Its Arms" was recorded during the sessions for Danzig's second album, Danzig II: Lucifuge, and features the full original Danzig lineup of Glenn Danzig, guitarist John Christ, Eerie Von, and drummer Chuck Biscuits.

Like all of Samhain's discography, and most of Danzig's prior work with the Misfits, Final Descent was originally released on Danzig's independent record label Plan 9, distributed by Caroline Records.

Apart from the band's reissues in 2000–01, this is the only Samhain release that does not have a 12" vinyl counterpart. Danzig said that some vinyl sleeves were made, but further plans to release the album on vinyl in 1990 were scrapped because he was not pleased with them.

The 1990 CD was issued in a longbox in some markets, and came with a large sticker on the cellophane wrapping, which read, "Samhain: Final Descent" in the same font used for the 1976 horror film The Omen and its three sequels. The 2001 reissue CD featured this phrase printed on the CD booklet itself.

== Reissues ==
In 2000 most of Samhain's catalogue, including Final Descent, was re-released as part of the Samhain Box Set on Danzig's new label, Evilive, distributed by E-Magine Music. It was subsequently reissued as a standalone CD 2001.

On these reissues, the original tracks 6–11 formed a separate Unholy Passion CD. On the Final Descent CD they were replaced with four unreleased Samhain Grim demos. Two of these tracks are earlier versions of songs that had appeared on Danzig's debut album: "Twist of Cain" and "Possession". "Trouble" is a cover of an Elvis Presley song recorded for the film King Creole. A re-recording of the song is featured on the Danzig EP, Thrall-Demonsweatlive. The fourth track is an earlier alternate version of the Final Descent track "Lords of the Left Hand". This alternate version was recorded in September 1986, while the "original version" was not recorded until September 1987, and was not mixed in its final form until 1990.

The Samhain box set and individual CD reissues of this album incorrectly reverse the listing of tracks 7 and 9. The correct order of the songs as they are played on the CD is listed below. The misprinted track listing actually conforms to the order of the songs on earlier bootlegged audio copies of this recording session.

== Track listing ==
All songs written and composed by Glenn Danzig, except "Trouble" by Jerry Leiber and Mike Stoller.

Original 1990 release
No.	Title	Length
1.	"Night Chill"	2:15
2.	"Descent"	4:23
3.	"Death...In Its Arms"	2:54
4.	"Lords of the Left Hand"	3:05
5.	"The Birthing"	3:29
6.	"Unholy Passion"	3:11
7.	"All Hell"	2:20
8.	"Moribund"	1:43
9.	"The Hungry End"	3:07
10.	"Misery Tomb"	3:25
11.	"I Am Misery"	3:41

2001 release
No.	Title	Length
6.	"Twist of Cain"	4:17
7.	"Possession"	3:44
8.	"Trouble" (Elvis Presley cover)	3:19
9.	"Lords of the Left Hand" (2nd Version)	2:41

== Personnel ==
=== Tracks 1–5 ===
- Glenn Danzig – vocals, guitar, drums
- Eerie Von – bass
- John Christ – guitar
- Chuck Biscuits – drums on "Death...In Its Arms"

Technical:

- Pa - cutting
- Bob Allecca - engineer
- Martin Schmelze - engineer (remix engineer)

=== Tracks 6–11 (1990 release) ===
- See Unholy Passion E.P.
- Glenn Danzig - vocals, guitar, keyboards
- Eerie Von - bass
- Steve Zing - drums

Technical:

- Cr - cutting
- Bob Allecca - engineer
- Martin Schmelze - engineer (Remix Engineer)

=== Tracks 6–9 (2000–01 release) ===
- Glenn Danzig – vocals, guitar, keyboards
- Eerie Von – bass
- London May – drums

Technical:

- Pa - cutting
- Cr - cutting
- Bob Allecca - engineer
- Martin Schmelze - engineer (remix engineer)
- Tom Baker - mastered by
