= Envaatnags Eflos Solf Esgantaavne =

Studio album by Horna
- Released: 2005
- Genre: Black metal
- Length: 48:56
- Label: Woodcut Records

Horna chronology
Vuohipaimen (2004)	Envaatnags Eflos Solf Esgantaavne (2005)	Horna/Blackdeath split (2005)

Envaatnags Eflos Solf Esgantaavne is the fourth full-length studio album released by the black metal band Horna. The title of the album is complete gibberish unless you remove the even letters, with the remaining odd letters spelling "Evangels of Satan", and the even letters spelling it backwards. This technically makes this album the band's only English titled release. It was released in 2005 on Woodcut records. The song "Kuilunhenki" is exclusive to the CD and digital versions.

== Track listing ==
No.	Title	Length
1.	"Vihan Tie (English: Path of Hatred)"	7:26
2.	"Musta Temppeli (English: Black Temple)"	8:09
3.	"Vala Pedolle (English: Oath to the Beast)"	8:29
4.	"Kirous Ja Malja (English: Curse and Chalice)"	4:24
5.	"Saastainen Kaste (English: Filthy Baptism)"	4:28
6.	"Kuoleva Lupaus (English: Dying Promise)"	7:34
7.	"Zythifer (Instrumental)"	3:37
8.	"Kuilunhenki (English: Abyss Spirit)"	4:49
Total length:		48:56

== Personnel ==
=== Additional personnel ===
- Christophe Szpajdel - logo
