= From the Devil's Chalice =

2008 extended play by Behexen

From the Devil's Chalise is a 2008 EP by black metal band Behexen. It was released as a three 7" vinyl box-set, including a Behexen logo patch and stickers.

The material was recorded in 2004, but the release was delayed for several reasons for four years.

== Track listing ==
No.	Title	Length
1.	"Canto I – Invocation of Zabulus"	5:00
2.	"Canto II – Melancholic Remembrances of Dark Times"	5:16
3.	"Canto III – From the Devil's Chalise"	4:48
4.	"Canto IV – Void…"	4:48
5.	"Canto V – Holy Foul"	5:05
6.	"Canto VI – Canticle (for Ye Lord)"	5:09

== Personnel ==
=== Additional personnel ===
- Christophe Szpajdel – logo
