= Askel lähempänä Saatanaa =

Studio album by Horna
- Released: February 23, 2013
- Recorded: July–December 2012 at the Boneyard Dungeon
- Genre: Black metal
- Length: 48:04
- Label: World Terror Committee

Horna chronology
Sanojesi Äärelle (2008)	Askel lähempänä Saatanaa (2013)	Hengen tulet (2015)

Askel lähempänä Saatanaa (Finnish for "a step closer to Satan") is the eighth studio album by the Finnish black metal band Horna. It was released on February 23, 2013. It is the band's first full-length studio album to feature Spellgoth on vocals, having replaced Corvus.

== Reception ==
Professional ratings
Review scores
Source	Rating
Kaaoszine	7/10
Pitchfork	6.5/10

== Track listing ==
1. Alku - 01:55 (instrumental) (English: Beginning)
2. Askel lähempänä Saatanaa - 06:30 (English: A Step Closer to Satan)
3. Kunnia herralle, kuninkaalle - 04:40 (English: Glory to the Lord, the King)
4. Kuolema kuoleman jälkeen - 03:53 (English: Death After Death)
5. Ei aikaa kyyneleille - 04:43 (English: No Time for Tears)
6. Kärsimyksin vuoltu hänen valittuna äänenään - 06:57 (English: With Misery Crafted as His/Her Chosen Voice)
7. Aamutähden pyhimys - 06:15 (English: Saint of the Morning Star)
8. Pala tai palvele - 04:21 (English: Burn or Serve)
9. Ota omaksesi, luoksesi - 04:47 (English: Take (It) for Yourself, to You)

== Personnel ==
- Shatraug - Guitars
- Infection - Guitars
- Vainaja - Drums
- Spellgoth - Vocals
- Hex Inferi - Bass

== Additional ==
- Antti "Nuitar" Saukkonen - Artwork
- Elena Vasilaki - Photography, Layout
- Shatraug - Layout
- Christophe Szpajdel - logo
