= Youth Anthems for the New Order =

Album by Reagan Youth

Studio album by Reagan Youth
- Released: July 1984
- Recorded: Spring 1983–spring 1984
- Genre: Punk rock, hardcore punk
- Label: R Radical

Reagan Youth chronology
Youth Anthems for the New Order (1984)	Volume 1 (1990)

Youth Anthems for the New Order is the first album by punk band Reagan Youth. Recorded at High 5 Studios, NYC in 1983-1984, the album was released folded in a large two sided poster instead of a traditional album cover. It was subsequently re-released with three extra tracks as Volume 1 on New Red Archives.

The song "Degenerated" was used prominently in the film Airheads, sung by lead actor Brendan Fraser. The song "I Hate Hate" was used in the 2023 animated film Robot Dreams.

== Track listing ==
No.	Title	Length
1.	"New @ry@ns"	1:17
2.	"Re@g@n Youth"	1:16
3.	"(Are You Really) Happy?"	1:34
4.	"I Hate Hate!"	1:58
5.	"Degenerated"	2:22
6.	"U.S.@."	1:23
7.	"(You're a) Gonowhere"	1:22

== Personnel ==
- "Dave Insurgent" (Dave Rubinstein) - Vocals
- "Paul Cripple" (Paul Bakija) - Guitar
- Al Pike - Bass
- Steve Weissman - Drums
- Russ, Jerry, Andy Apathy, Poss, Tripper - Backing Vocals
- Jerry Williams - Engineer
- Produced by Reagan Youth in conjunction with R Radical Records

Volume 1

Studio album (re-issue) by Reagan Youth
- Released: 1990
- Recorded: Spring 1983–spring 1984
- Genre: Punk rock, hardcore punk
- Label: New Red Archives

Reagan Youth chronology
Youth Anthems for the New Order (1984)	Volume 1 (1990)	Volume 2 (1990)

== Volume 1 ==
Youth Anthems for the New Order was re-released in 1990 by San Francisco indie label New Red Archives as Volume 1 with several different takes of songs recorded during the album sessions and three outtakes: "No Class", "Anytown", and "In Dog We Trust".

== Track listing ==
No.	Title	Length
1.	"Reagan Youth"	1:16
2.	"New Aryans"	1:17
3.	"(Are You) Happy?"	1:34
4.	"No Class"	1:34
5.	"I Hate Hate"	1:58
6.	"Degenerated"	2:22
7.	"Go Nowhere"	1:22
8.	"U S A"	1:23
9.	"Anytown"	2:00
10.	"In Dog We Trust"	2:47
