= Haudankylmyyden Mailla =

Studio album by Horna
- Released: 1999
- Recorded: Astia Studio, Lappeenranta, December 1997 – January 1998
- Genre: Black metal
- Length: 66:04
- Label: Solistitium Records
- Producer: Anssi Kippo

Horna chronology
Kohti Yhdeksän Nousua (1998)	Haudankylmyyden Mailla (1999)	Sota (1999)

Haudankylmyyden Mailla (Finnish for "in the lands of the coldness of graves") is the second full-length studio album by the black metal band Horna. It was released on Solistitium Records in 1999 and was limited to 1,500 copies. It was then re-released by Omvina Records in 2005, and again on Blut & Eisen Productions in 2007. Both re-released versions have some type of alteration from the original version.

== Track listing ==
No.	Title	Length
1.	"Prologi (English: Prologue)"	2:20
2.	"Yhdeksän Yö (English: The Night of the Nine)"	7:48
3.	"...Jeesuksen Verestä (English: ...By Jesus's Blood)"	4:55
4.	"Ylle Kuihtuneen Ajan Ajatusten (rough English: Of the Thoughts of Time Wilted Above)"	7:51
5.	"Kun Jumalan Sydän On Murskattu (English: When the Heart of God Has Been Crushed)"	4:49
6.	"(Kaiken) Kristityn Kuolema (English: The Death of (Everything) Christian)"	5:39
7.	"Viimeinen Sielu Jumalan Valosta (English: The Last Soul from God's Light)"	5:14
8.	"Haudankylmyyden Maille (English: To the Lands of the Coldness of Graves)"	3:48
9.	"Hymni Tuomiopäivänä (English: Hymn on Doomsday)"	6:08
10.	"Peikkomaille (English: To the Lands of the Goblins or To the Lands of the Trolls)"	5:43
11.	"Epilogi (English: Epilogue)"	9:04
12.	"Kunnia Saatanalle, Sota (English: Glory to Satan, War)"	2:45

== Personnel ==
Band members

- Lauri Penttilä (Nazgul) – vocals
- Jyri Vahvanen (Moredhel) – guitar
- Shatraug – guitar
- Skratt – bass
- Gorthaur – drums

Technical staff

- Anssi Kippo – mixer, recorder, producer
- Jere Juutilainen (Fuuturi KY, LPR) – artwork design
- Mattias Persson – other artwork
- Kris Verwimp – portraits
- Christophe Szpajdel – logo
