= Samhain III: November-Coming-Fire =

Studio album by Samhain
- Released: February 1986
- Recorded: June–August 1985 at Reel Platinum, Lodi, New Jersey
- Genres: Deathrock, horror punk
- Length: 28:30
- Label: Plan 9
- Producer: Glenn Danzig

Samhain chronology
Unholy Passion (1985)	Samhain III: November-Coming-Fire (1986)	Final Descent (1990)

Professional ratings
Review scores
Source	Rating
AllMusic	4.5/5 stars

Samhain III: November-Coming-Fire (or just November-Coming-Fire) is the second studio album by American deathrock band Samhain. It was released in February 1986, through lead singer Glenn Danzig's independent record label, Plan 9.

== Background ==
November-Coming-Fire was Samhain's last album before Danzig signed the group to Def American Recordings and changed the band name to Danzig. The album contains a re-recorded version of "Halloween II" by Danzig's previous band, the Misfits.

== Track listing ==
All tracks are written by Glenn Danzig

No.	Title	Length
1.	"Diabolos '88"	1:24
2.	"In My Grip"	2:44
3.	"Mother of Mercy"	3:09
4.	"Birthright"	2:10
5.	"To Walk the Night"	2:11
6.	"Let the Day Begin"	2:36
7.	"Halloween II"	3:15
8.	"November's Fire"	2:47
9.	"Kiss of Steel"	1:29
10.	"Unbridled"	1:48
11.	"Human Pony Girl"	4:57

== Legacy ==
AllMusic wrote that the album "continues to be an influence for both punk and thrash bands". The track "Mother of Mercy" was featured in the 2009 video game Guitar Hero: Metallica. Metallica co-founder James Hetfield lists November-Coming-Fire as one of his top ten albums of all time.

== Personnel ==
- Glenn Danzig – vocals, keyboards; drums on tracks "Diabolos 88", "Birthright", "Let The Day Begin", "Novembers Fire" and "Human Pony Girl"
- Eerie Von – bass guitar, background vocals
- Pete "Damien" Marshall – guitar, background vocals
- London May – drums on tracks "In My Grip", "Mother Of Mercy", "To Walk The Night", "Halloween II" and "Kiss Of Steel"; background vocals

Technical

- Bob Allecca – engineering
- Pa – cutting
