= Initium =

Studio album by Samhain
- Released: 1984
- Recorded: 1981; August 1983 – May 1984
- Genres: Deathrock, horror punk
- Length: 29:01
- Label: Plan 9
- Producer: Glenn Danzig

Samhain chronology
Initium (1984)	Unholy Passion (EP) (1985)

Professional ratings
Review scores
Source	Rating
AllMusic	3/5 stars
Punknews.org	5/5 stars

Initium is the 1984 debut album by American deathrock band Samhain, released on lead singer Glenn Danzig's independent record label Plan 9. In various interviews, Danzig stated that the album's title, which translates from Latin to English as "beginning", represents his new start after disbanding his prior band, Misfits, in 1983. Most of the final track, "Archangel", was actually recorded in March 1981 with Jerry Only, and was originally meant to either be a Misfits song featuring Dave Vanian (who never did vocals for the song) or a track for the Damned. The track "Horror Biz" likewise dates to Danzig's Misfits era, as it is a new version of "Horror Business" with different musical arrangements. The album was recorded at Reel Platinum studio in Lodi, New Jersey, excluding the introduction which was recorded at Eerie Von's home on a four track cassette.

== Different versions ==
The 1986 cassette release features Initium plus the entire original version of the band's follow-up record, the Unholy Passion EP, and is highly prized by collectors. Also much sought is the initial 1987 CD release of Initium, which featured the album plus the re-recorded/remixed version of the EP. (In 1989, these extra tracks were removed from all future CD pressings, and were instead included on the original 1990 Final Descent album). A very rare pressing exists, which contains the full Initium album and only the remixed title track from the EP. Likewise, some copies of the 2001 Initium reissue also feature the song "Unholy Passion" as an unlisted bonus track.

== Track listing ==
All songs written and composed by Glenn Danzig.

Original 1984 LP and most CD and cassette releases

Side A
No.	Title	Length
1.	"Initium / Samhain"	3:39
2.	"Black Dream"	2:00
3.	"All Murder All Guts All Fun"	2:44
4.	"Macabre"	2:12
5.	"He-Who-Can-Not-Be-Named"	1:38

Side B
No.	Title	Length
6.	"Horror Biz"	2:41
7.	"The Shift"	3:08
8.	"The Howl"	2:50
9.	"Archangel"	5:12
10.	"Unholy Passion" (*)	3:10

* Unlisted bonus track only on 1989 2nd press CD and on some copies of 2001 reissue

1986 cassette and 1987 CD

No.	Title	Length
1.	"Initium / Samhain" (**)	3:39
2.	"Black Dream"	2:00
3.	"All Murder All Guts All Fun"	2:44
4.	"Macabre"	2:12
5.	"He-Who-Can-Not-Be-Named"	1:38
6.	"Horror Biz"	2:41
7.	"The Shift"	3:08
8.	"The Howl"	2:50
9.	"Archangel"	5:12
10.	"Unholy Passion"	3:10
11.	"All Hell"	2:19
12.	"Moribund"	1:43
13.	"The Hungry End"	3:06
14.	"Misery Tomb" (***)	3:24
15.	"I Am Misery"	3:40

** "Initium" and "Samhain" appear as a single track on all CD releases of the album.

*** This song only appears on the CD version as part of the 1987 remix of Unholy Passion.

== Personnel ==
=== Tracks 1–9 ===
- Glenn Danzig - vocals, guitar
- Eerie Von - bass
- Steve Zing - drums, ambience on "Initium"
- Lyle Preslar - lead guitar on "Black Dream", "Macabre", "Horror Biz" and "The Shift"
- Al Pike - bass on "Archangel"
- Mike Gutilla - chimes

Technical

- Bob Allecca - engineering
- Pa - cutting

=== Tracks 10–15 ===
- Glenn Danzig - vocals, guitar, keyboards
- Eerie Von - bass
- Steve Zing - drums

Technical

- Cr - cutting
- Bob Alleca - engineer
- Martin Schmelze - remix engineer
