= Sudentaival =

Studio album by Horna
- Released: March 15, 2001
- Recorded: January 8–18, 2001
- Studios: Studio Astia A, Lappeenranta, Finland
- Genre: Black metal
- Length: 42:08
- Label: Woodcut Records
- Producer: Jussi Jauhiainen

Horna chronology
Hiidentorni / Perimä Vihassa Ja Verikostossa (2000)	Sudentaival (2001)	Korpin Hetki (2002)

Sudentaival is the third full-length studio album by the black metal band Horna. Roughly translated, sudentaival means "the wolf's journey". It was released in 2001 by Woodcut Records. An LP version was later released by Sombre Records and was limited to 350 copies. The South American version includes two bonus tracks, "Koston Talvi" and "Voitonmalja". These were the very first tracks done with Corvus.

== Track listing ==
- All music by Aarni T. Otava and Shatraug. Lyrics by Satanic Warmaster and Shatraug. Arranged by Horna.

No.	Title	Length
1.	"Synkän Muiston Äärellä (English: At A Bleak Memory)"	7:20
2.	"Sudentaival (English: Path of the Wolf / Passage of the Wolf)"	3:20
3.	"Black Metal Sodomy"	2:17
4.	"Talventuoja (English: Bringer of Winter)"	3:28
5.	"Haudanusva (English: Grave Fog)"	5:27
6.	"Skaldiriimu (English: Skald Rune)"	3:11
7.	"Kun Synkkä Ikuisuus Avautuu (English: When Bleak Eternity Opens)"	3:22
8.	"Hautajaisyö (English: Funeral Night)"	4:41
9.	"Noidanloitsu (English: Witch's Hex)"	4:29
10.	"Vihasta Ja Arvista (English: From Anger and Scars)"	4:25
Total length:		42:08

== Personnel ==
- Satanic Warmaster: vocals
- Shatraug: guitars
- Aarni T. Otava: guitars
- Vrasjarn: bass guitar
- Gorthaur: drums

== Production ==
- Produced and recorded by Jussi Jauhiainen; recording assisted by Sauli Impola.
- Mixed by Anssi Kippo, Studio Astia A, January 19–20.
- Mastered by Mika Jussila at Finnvox Studios, February 8, 2001.
- Logo by Christophe Szpajdel.
