= Ääniä Yössä =

Studio album by Horna
- Released: September 1, 2006
- Genre: Black metal
- Length: 43:39
- Label: Debemur Morti
- Producer: Shatraug, Corvus

Horna chronology
Vihan Vuodet (2005)	Ääniä Yössä (2006)	split with Legion of Doom (2006)

Ääniä Yössä (Finnish for "Voices in the night") is the fifth full-length studio album by Finnish black metal band Horna. It was released on Debemur Morti Productions in 2006.

== Track listing ==
- All songs written and arranged by Shatraug and Corvus.
1. "Raiskattu Saastaisessa Valossa" – 9:25 (Translation: "Raped In Filthy Light")
2. "Noutajan Kutsu" – 4:41 (Translation: "Call of the Reaper")
3. "Mustan Surman Rukous" – 8:12 (Translation: "Black Death Prayer")
4. "Ääni Yössä" – 21:21 (Translation: "A Voice In the Night")

== Personnel ==
- Corvus: Vocals
- Shatraug: Guitars, Vocals
- Infection: Bass
- Vainaja: Drums

=== Additional personnel ===
- Christophe Szpajdel - logo
