= Sanojesi Äärelle =

Studio album by Horna
- Released: September 29, 2008
- Recorded: during the winter of 2007–2008
- Genre: Black metal
- Length: 85:41
- Label: Debemur Morti Productions, Deviant, Moribund

Horna chronology
Pimeyden Hehku (2007)	Sanojesi Äärelle (2008)	Askel lähempänä Saatanaa (2013)

Professional ratings
Review scores
Source	Rating
AllMusic	Unrated

Sanojesi Äärelle (roughly Finnish for "towards your words") is the seventh studio album by the Finnish black metal band Horna. It was published by Debemur Morti Productions on September 29, 2008. The Digi-CD-version was released via Moribund Records. while the vinyl version was handled through Deviant Records by being limited to 666 copies - 150 of them in coloured vinyl, that meant first ones in green vinyl, second ones of them in clear vinyl. Each record comes in separate single cover sleeve, with lyric sheet and a flyer. A tape version was publicized and bounded to 15 copies. It's the last Horna album to feature Corvus on vocals.

== Track listing ==
Disc 1

1. "Muinaisten Alttarilta" - 05:30 (English: From the Altar of the Ancients)
2. "Verilehto" - 05:22 (English: Grove of Blood)
3. "Mustan Kirkkauden Sarastus" - 04:43 (English: Dawn of Black Brightness)
4. "Katseet" - 04:25 (English: Looks)
5. "Askeesi" - 04:42 (English: Asceticism)
6. "Sanojesi Äärelle" - 04:19 (rough English: Towards Your Words)
7. "Orjaroihu" - 04:28 (English: Blaze of Slaves)
8. "Risti Ja Ruoska" - 04:54 (English: Cross and Whip)
9. "Wikinger (Pest cover)" - 03:25
10. "Merkuriana" - 06:02

Disc 2

1. "Liekki Ja Voima" - 10:57 (English: Flame and Power)
2. "Ruumisalttari" - 07:01 (English: Altar of Corpses)
3. "Musta Rukous" - 10:50 (English: Black Prayer)
4. "Baphometin Siunaus" - 08:39 (English: Blessing of Baphomet)

== Personnel ==
- Corvus – vocals
- Shatraug – guitar
- Infection – bass
- Vainaja – drums
