= Samhain (band) =

American rock band

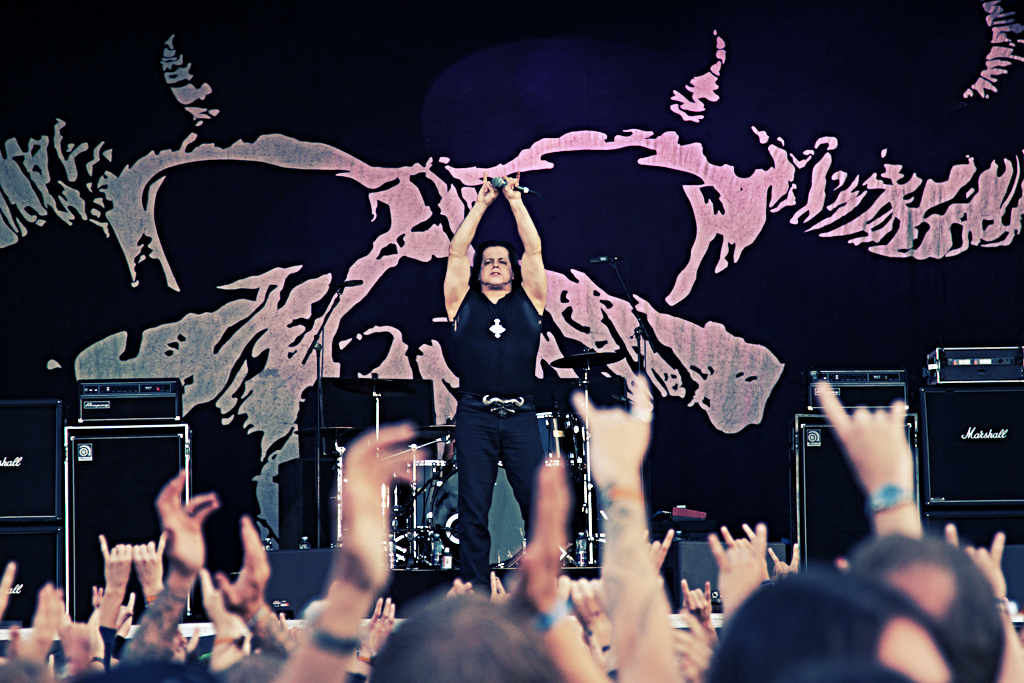
- Glenn Danzig in 2011

Background information
- Origin: United States
- Genres: Death rock; horror punk; heavy metal
- Years active: 1983–1987 (changed their name to Danzig) (partial reunions: 1999, 2011, 2012, 2014)
- Labels: Plan 9; Caroline
- Spinoffs: Danzig, Son of Sam
- Spinoff of: Misfits, Minor Threat
- Past members: Glenn Danzig; Steve Zing; Eerie Von; Pete "Damien" Marshall; London May; John Christ; Brian Baker; Lyle Preslar

Samhain was an American rock band formed by singer Glenn Danzig in 1983, immediately following his departure from the Misfits. Glenn Danzig originally planned Samhain as a side project with Eerie Von. After the Misfits' contentious 1983 dissolution, Samhain became Danzig's full-time band.

Samhain catalogs a transitional period in Glenn Danzig's musical career, bridging the gap between the punk rock/horror punk of the Misfits and the dark, heavy metal- and blues-influenced sound of Danzig. Samhain's lyrics were much darker than those of the Misfits, with themes rooted in paganism and the occult and eventually the horrors of reality, as opposed to the sometimes cartoonish ghouls and ghosts of the Misfits.

Both Samhain and its successor, Danzig, use the same horned skull image originally drawn by artist Michael Golden for the cover of the 1984 comic book The Saga of Crystar No. 8, published by Marvel Comics. The font often used in the wordmarks of Samhain, and later Danzig, is taken from the film The Giant Gila Monster. Danzig took the name of the band from the Irish month of November and pre-Christian, Celtic festival Samhain, the origin of the modern Halloween. Despite the festival being pronounced "sau-win", the band's name is often pronounced as "sam-hane". Glenn Danzig has said that both pronunciations are correct.

Samhain released two full-length albums and one EP during their three-year career as an active band. Danzig has said that he wrote two songs ("Death Comes Ripping" and "Bloodfeast") with the intention of using them on the first Samhain album, but instead recorded them with the Misfits for the Earth A.D./Wolfs Blood album in order to round out that band's final series of recordings and release a full album.

== History ==
=== Original run (1983–1990) ===
Following the 1983 breakup of his band the Misfits, vocalist Glenn Danzig approached the band's photographer Eerie Von about forming a new band. They began rehearsing as a duo, before recruiting Brian Baker and Lyle Preslar, whose band Minor Threat had also just disbanded. This lineup lasted less than a year.

Samhain's debut album, Initium, was released on Danzig's independent record label, Plan 9, in August 1984. In various interviews Danzig states that the album's title, which translates from Latin to English as "beginning", represents his new start after disbanding his prior band, The Misfits, in 1983. Most of the final track, "Archangel", was actually recorded in March 1981, and was originally meant to either be a Misfits song featuring Dave Vanian (who never did vocals for the song) or a track for the band The Damned. The track "Horror Biz" likewise dates to Danzig's Misfits era, as it is a new version of "Horror Business" with different musical arrangements. The album was recorded at Reel Platinum studio in Lodi, New Jersey, excluding the introduction which was recorded at Eerie Von's home on a four track cassette.

In 1985, Samhain released their only EP, Unholy Passion. That next year, they released their second studio album titled Samhain III: November-Coming-Fire. The album contains a re-recorded version of the Misfits' "Halloween II". AllMusic wrote that the album "continues to be an influence for both punk and thrash bands". The track "Mother of Mercy" was featured in the 2009 video game Guitar Hero: Metallica. Metallica co-founder James Hetfield lists November-Coming-Fire as one of his top ten albums of all time.

In 1986, Samhain was signed by Rick Rubin to his Def Jam Recordings label. Rubin at first wished only to sign Danzig. He had hoped to assemble a "super-group" with the talented vocalist at the center, but Danzig refused and also refused to agree to the record deal unless bassist Eerie Von could remain in the group. Rubin and Danzig agreed, however, that the band's sound should be taken in a different direction, and so guitarist Damien Marshall was replaced by John Christ. Sometime in 1987, Danzig decided to change the name of Samhain to match his surname, Danzig, a move that would prevent him from ever again having to start anew, regardless of lineup changes. When London May was replaced with Chuck Biscuits on drums, Samhain officially ceased to exist, and the first Danzig lineup was complete, which then prompted the band to sign to Def American Recordings in 1988.

In 1990, Samhain's final album, Final Descent, was released. Material for the album was completed in stages from 1986 to 1990, with one song ("Death... in its Arms") recorded by the band Danzig, including drummer Chuck Biscuits (who had never been a member of Samhain) during the sessions for Danzig II: Lucifuge. On all other tracks, a drum machine was used. As much of the material for Final Descent was intended for a planned Samhain Grim album, its sound and songwriting bridges the gap between 1986's November Coming Fire and 1988's Danzig. In its first pressings, Final Descent also featured new remixed versions of the then out-of-print Unholy Passion EP. Possibly to avoid potential legal disputes with former guitarist Damien Marshall, Danzig had overdubbed/re-recorded all of the original guitar tracks with his own guitar playing. He also created a new track, a remix of the bass and vocal tracks from "I Am Misery", entitled "Misery Tomb".

When the Samhain box set was released in 2000, these remixes were given a CD of their own, taking the place of the original Unholy Passion EP, while the backend of Final Descent was filled out with four unreleased Samhain Grim era tracks, all featuring London May on drums. Among these were earlier, more abrasive arrangements of the eventual Danzig classics "Twist of Cain" and "Possession", a cover of Elvis Presley's "Trouble" (later re-recorded for the 1993 Danzig EP Thrall-Demonsweatlive), and a faster version of "Lords of the Left Hand".

=== Reunions (1999–2014) ===
The band briefly reunited in November 1999 to celebrate the release of the Samhain box set. They went on one national tour with the band Danzig headlining. The lineup consisted of Danzig, Zing, May, and then Danzig guitarist Todd Youth. Marshall was initially asked to play guitar, but couldn't as he was already on tour with Iggy Pop.

Samhain would reunite again in October 2011 and 2012 as part of a series of shows called the Danzig Legacy performances. The shows consisted of a set from Danzig, Samhain, and a set of Misfits songs with Doyle Wolfgang von Frankenstein. Both London May and Steve Zing were part of this reunion.

Samhain reunited for the fourth time to play Riot Fest in September 2014. At that show, they played their debut album Initium in its entirety. The band also played a series of West Coast and East Coast shows from September to November. Peter Adams of the bands Baroness and Valkyrie handled guitar duties.

Another partial reunion took place in 2011 on the Danzig Legacy television special during a set of Samhain songs; "Samhain", and "To Walk the Night". The lineup remained the same with London May and Steve Zing sharing bass and drum duties, and with Tommy Victor playing guitar.

== Style ==
Samhain has been classified as death rock, horror punk, and heavy metal. Reviewing Final Descent for AllMusic, Bradley Torreano stated: "Still undecided on whether to play punk or heavy metal, Glenn Danzig tried to mix them both with a little goth".

Sometimes, Glenn Danzig could be seen donning a horned leather S&M mask, and occasionally he and his bandmates went onstage covered in faux blood. Danzig would play guitar on live performances of the song "Archangel", while the regular guitarist strapped on a bass guitar to perform a second bassline.

== Members ==
- Glenn Danzig – vocals, guitar, keyboards, drums (1983–1987, 1999, 2011–2012, 2014)
- Eerie Von – bass, drums (1983–1987)
- London May – drums, bass (1985–1987, 1999, 2011–2012, 2014)
- Pete "Damien" Marshall – guitar (1984–1986)
- Steve Zing – drums, bass (1983–1985, 1999, 2011–2012, 2014)
- John Christ – guitar (1987; died 2026)
- Brian Baker – bass (1983)
- Lyle Preslar – guitar (1983)

=== Touring musicians ===
- Todd Youth – guitar (1999; died 2018)
- Tommy Victor – guitar (2011–2012, 2014)
- Peter Adams – guitar (2014)

=== Session musicians ===
- Al Pike – bass (1983)
- Chuck Biscuits – drums (1990)

== Discography ==
Studio albums

- Initium (1984)
- Samhain III: November-Coming-Fire (1986)
- Final Descent (1990)

EPs

- Unholy Passion (1985)

Compilation albums

- Box Set (2000)

Live albums

- Samhain Live '85–'86 (2001)
