= Dave Rubinstein =

American singer

David Rubinstein
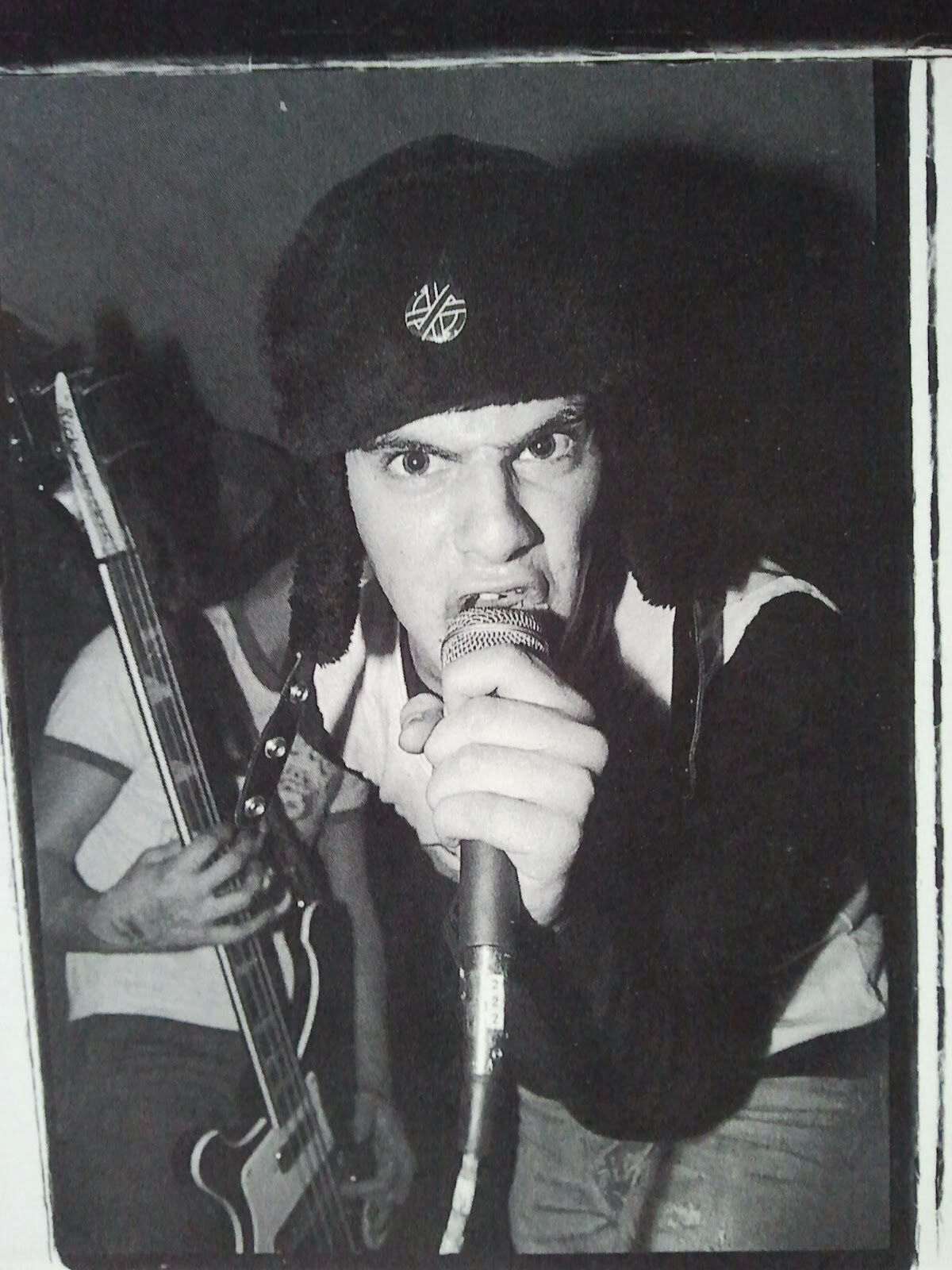

Background information
- Also known as: Dave Insurgent
- Born: September 9,1964
- Origin: Forest Hills, Queens, New York City, U.S.
- Died: July 3, 1993 (aged 28)
- Genres: Punk rock, hardcore punk
- Occupation: Musician
- Instrument: Vocals
- Years active: 1980–1990
- Formerly of: Reagan Youth, House of God

David Rubinstein, also known as Dave Insurgent (September 9, 1964 – July 3, 1993), was an American singer and co-founder of the New York–based hardcore punk band Reagan Youth. Rubinstein founded the band with guitarist Paul Bakija when both were in Forest Hills High School in Forest Hills, Queens. The band played the punk clubs of Manhattan while the members were still in high school.

== Reagan Youth ==
The band performed regularly at CBGB's and other venues on the United States' budding punk rock circuit. They never recorded a single, only some self-published tapes and an album that was turned into a seven-song EP. That EP sold more than 40,000 copies. The band also appeared on several compilations albums, including Live at CBGB's. They toured cross-country twice, in 1984 and 1987, sharing bills with punk bands such as Dead Kennedys, U.S. Chaos, Agnostic Front, Bad Brains and Beastie Boys. They were a mainstay at CBGB's Sunday matinee concerts and performed at Rock Against Racism concerts in the early 1980s.

Reagan Youth was a left-wing band, often using Ku Klux Klan and Nazi Party imagery as political satire. In their original 1980s incarnation, they sought to address the perceived parallels between the policies of president Ronald Reagan, the Christian Right and American conservatives and the beliefs of hate groups. Their eponymous song, "Reagan Youth", posited a similarities between Young Republicans and the Hitler Youth.

By the late 1980s, the Reagan Youth members were frustrated and worn out from years of touring, drug use and low income from their music. When Reagan left office, the band officially disbanded. Rubinstein and several other band members continued to play music together, such as in the band House of God, which never achieved the same success as Reagan Youth.

== Personal problems and suicide ==
By the time that Reagan Youth broke up, Rubinstein had developed a serious heroin addiction and was dealing drugs. An unknown assailant beat up Rubinstein with a baseball bat, leaving him in a coma. While admitted at the hospital, Rubinstein received a lobotomy to relieve brain trauma and save his life.

When he got out of the hospital, he returned to his parents' home. There, Rubinstein continued to use drugs, smoking cannabis in his bedroom as his parents tried to help him recover. Eventually, Rubinstein left his parents' home and moved back to the Lower East Side. By then, between the assault, lobotomy, and his continued drug use, he was no longer as energetic and had become dishevelled. Many of his friends from the punk scene no longer associated with him.

Rubinstein began dating Tiffany Bresciani, a prostitute who worked on Houston Street and danced in strip clubs around the city. He had told his parents that she was a dancer. Bresciani financially supported the couple and their drug habit with prostitution. Rubinstein often waited for Bresciani while she worked and then accompanied her to buy drugs.

On June 24, 1993, Rubinstein and Bresciani were waiting on Allen Street when a familiar customer pulled up in a Mazda pickup truck. Bresciani got in, telling Rubinstein that she would return in 20 minutes. She never came back. Rubinstein called the police with a description of the truck. He went to the club where Bresciani danced, and all the hospital emergency rooms in the city, searching for her. A few days later, on June 28, two New York state troopers were patrolling Long Island's Southern State Parkway when they pulled over the truck after a low-speed chase, and found Bresciani's decaying body in the back. They arrested the driver, Joel Rifkin, an infamous serial killer.

A few days after his girlfriend's body was discovered, on June 30, 1993, Rubinstein's father accidentally ran over his mother, killing her.

On July 3, 1993, a few days after his mother's death, Rubinstein died by overdose.
