= Horna =

Finnish black metal band

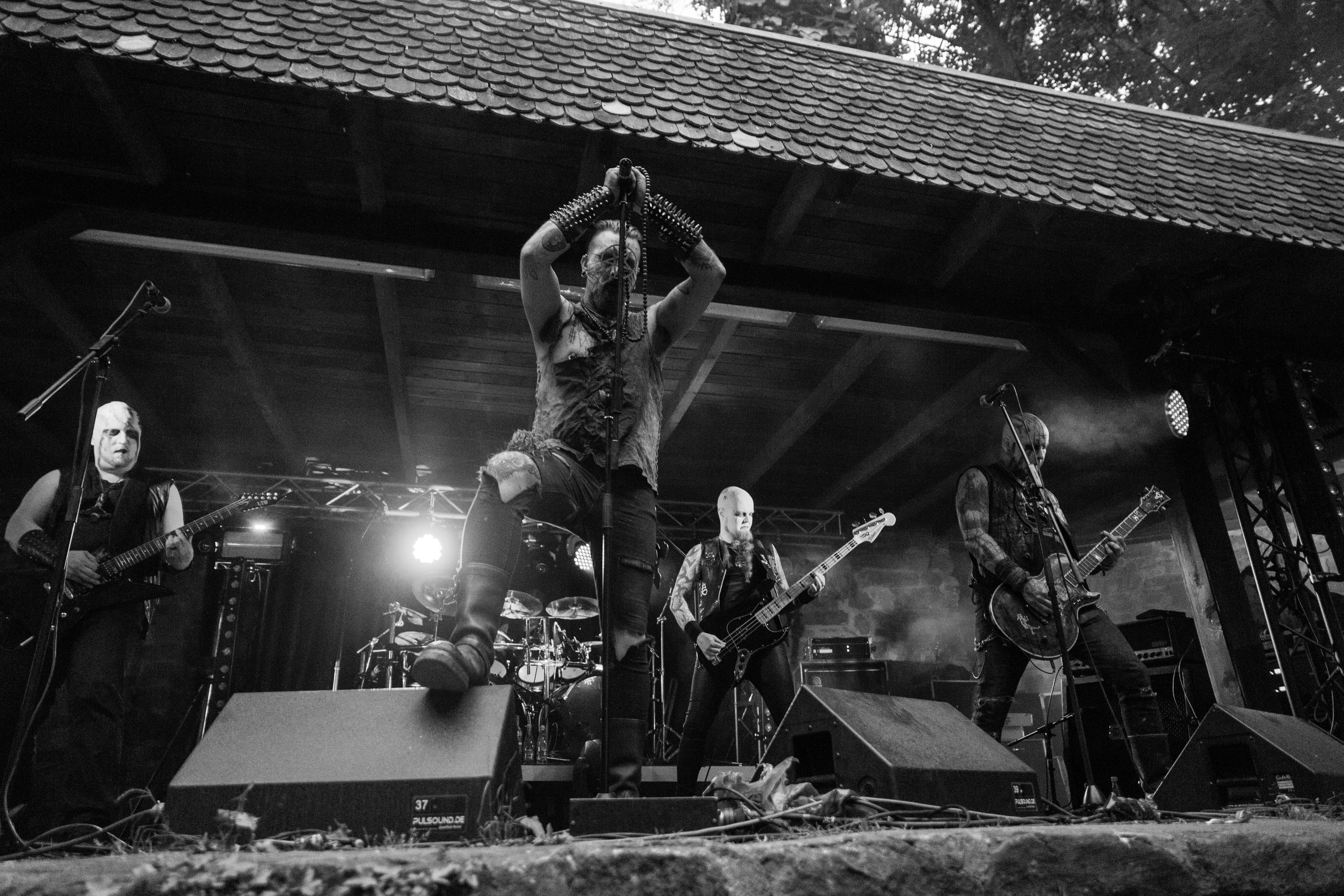
- Horna performing in 2018

Background information
- Origin: Lappeenranta, Finland
- Genre: Black metal
- Years active: 1994–present
- Labels: End All Life; Woodcut; Debemur Morti; World Terror Committee
- Members: Shatraug; Infection; Spellgoth; LRH; VnoM
- Past members: Nazgul von Armageddon; Moredhel; Thanatos; A. T. Otava; Skratt; Vrasjarn; Gorthaur; Lord Sargofagian; Saturnus; Corvus; Vainaja; Hex Inferi

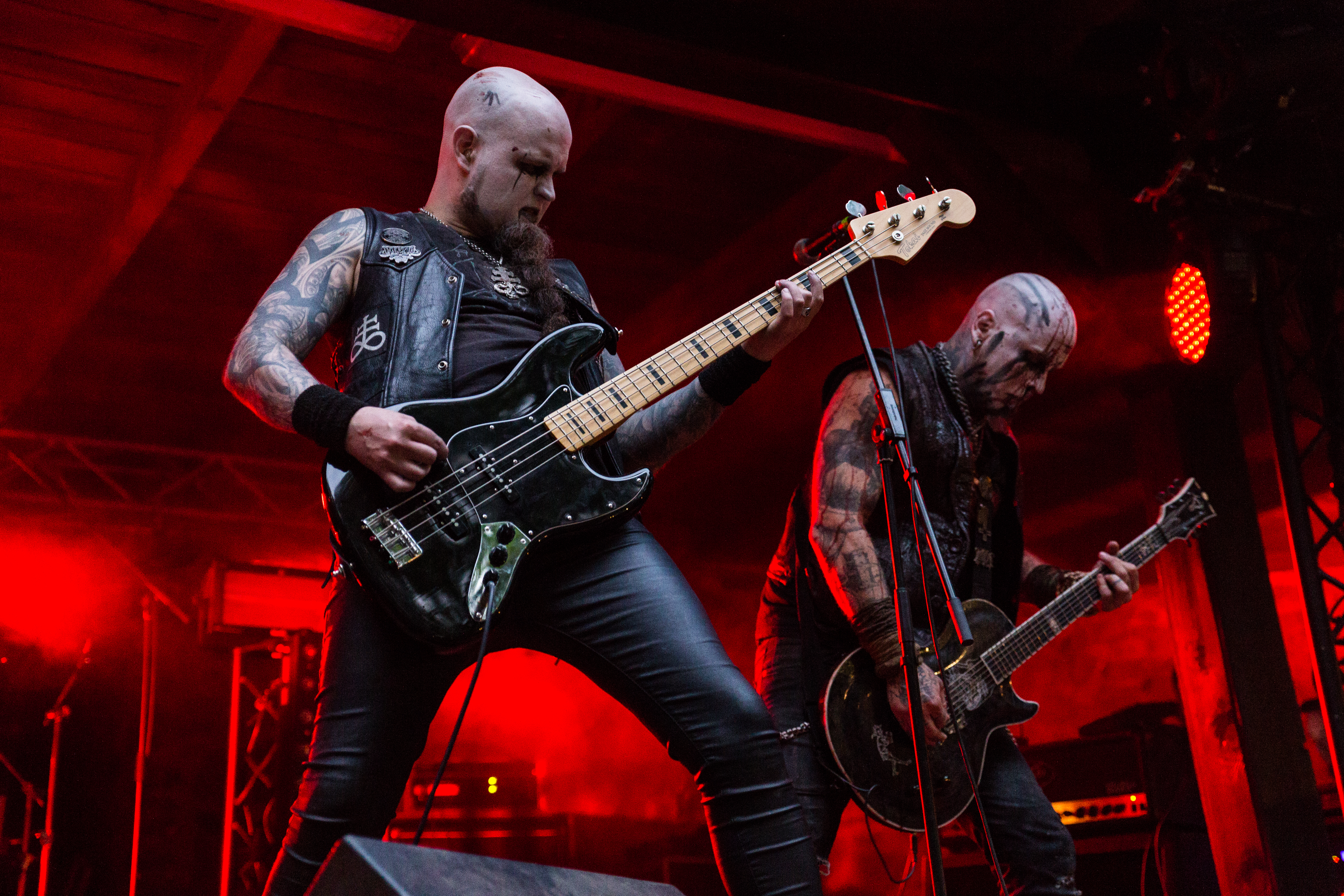
Horna at the Dark Troll Festival 2018

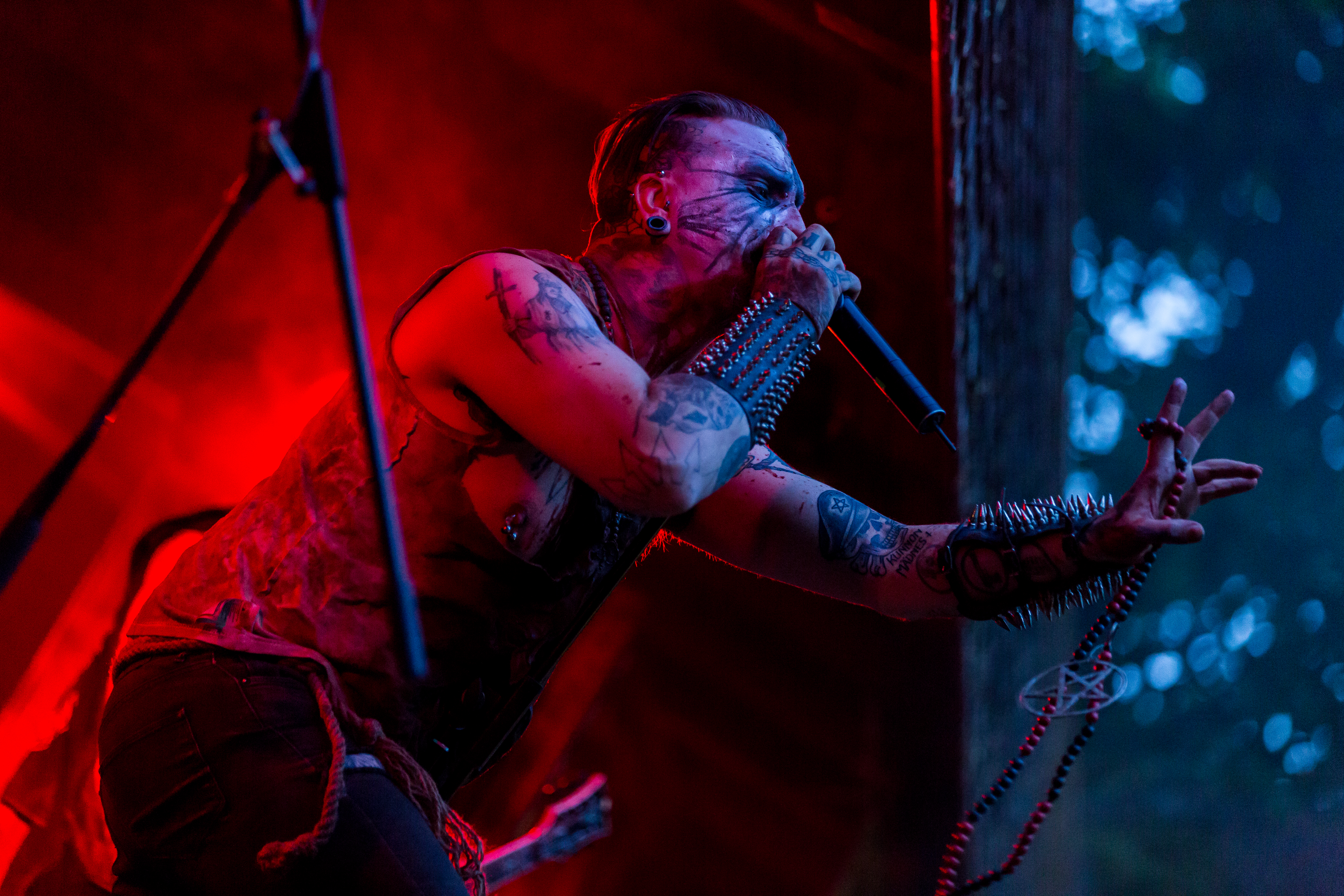
Singer Spellgoth at the Dark Troll Festival 2018

Horna (Finnish for "abyss" or "hell") is a Finnish black metal band formed Lappeenranta in 1994. The band has appeared on over fifty releases, including splits, demos, EPs and albums since 1995, released through numerous record labels.

== History ==
Vocalist and guitarist Shatraug, guitarist Moredhel, and drummer Gorthaur formed Horna in 1994. Horna did not record until early 1995. The first demo, Varjoissa, was released in September that year and sold out. In 1996, Nazgul von Armageddon took over vocals, and the band recorded their second demo, Hiidentorni, in January 1997, resulting in a deal with Solistitium Records. Their first full-length album, Kohti Yhdeksän Nousua, was released in 1998. The band continued to release albums on this label through June 1998, when Moredhel and bassist Skratt left the band. Bassist Thanatos replaced Skratt, and Moredhel rejoined that August. In 1999, the band signed to Oskorei Productions for a vinyl-only release of the band's second album, Haudankylmyyden Mailla. The band released a series of limited vinyl-only EPs and split albums through most of the early 2000s, with full-length studio albums coming out in the latter half of the decade. In 2002, Nazgul von Armageddon left the band, leaving vocals to Corvus. In July 2003, guitarist Aarni T. Otava left the group. Horna cited the loss of "dedication" as the reason for his departure, and revealed that Horna's performance at 2003's Tuska Open Air Metal Festival would be their last with Otava. Corvus left the band and Spellgoth took over as vocalist in 2009.

== Lyrics and style ==
Horna plays black metal and the lyrics are influenced by satanism and anti-christianity. Some of Horna's early work has also references to J. R. R Tolkien's novel The Lord of The Rings.

== Controversy ==
Horna has been criticized for NSBM ties. Former lead vocalist Nazgul von Armageddon was alleged to have expressed Nazi views in his solo project Satanic Warmaster. In 2005, founder Shatraug accused Nazgul of being "the Nazi in our ranks" and the band's website in 2007 declared that "[w]hat any ex-members might represent is not what we stand for." Shatraug said that Horna was "nationalist to a certain point", but not National Socialist.

In 2010 and again in 2019, Horna concerts were cancelled because of allegations that the band was involved with NSBM. The band responded by denying any involvement with national socialism. In response to members of the far-right extremist group Atomwaffen Division doing Nazi salutes in the crowd during a performance, Horna stated that the band has no interest in politics.

== Members ==
=== Current members ===
- Shatraug – guitar (1994–present)
- Infection – guitar, backing vocals (2008–present)
- Spellgoth – lead vocals (2009–present)
- LRH – drums (2016–present)
- VnoM – bass guitar (2018–present)

=== Former members ===
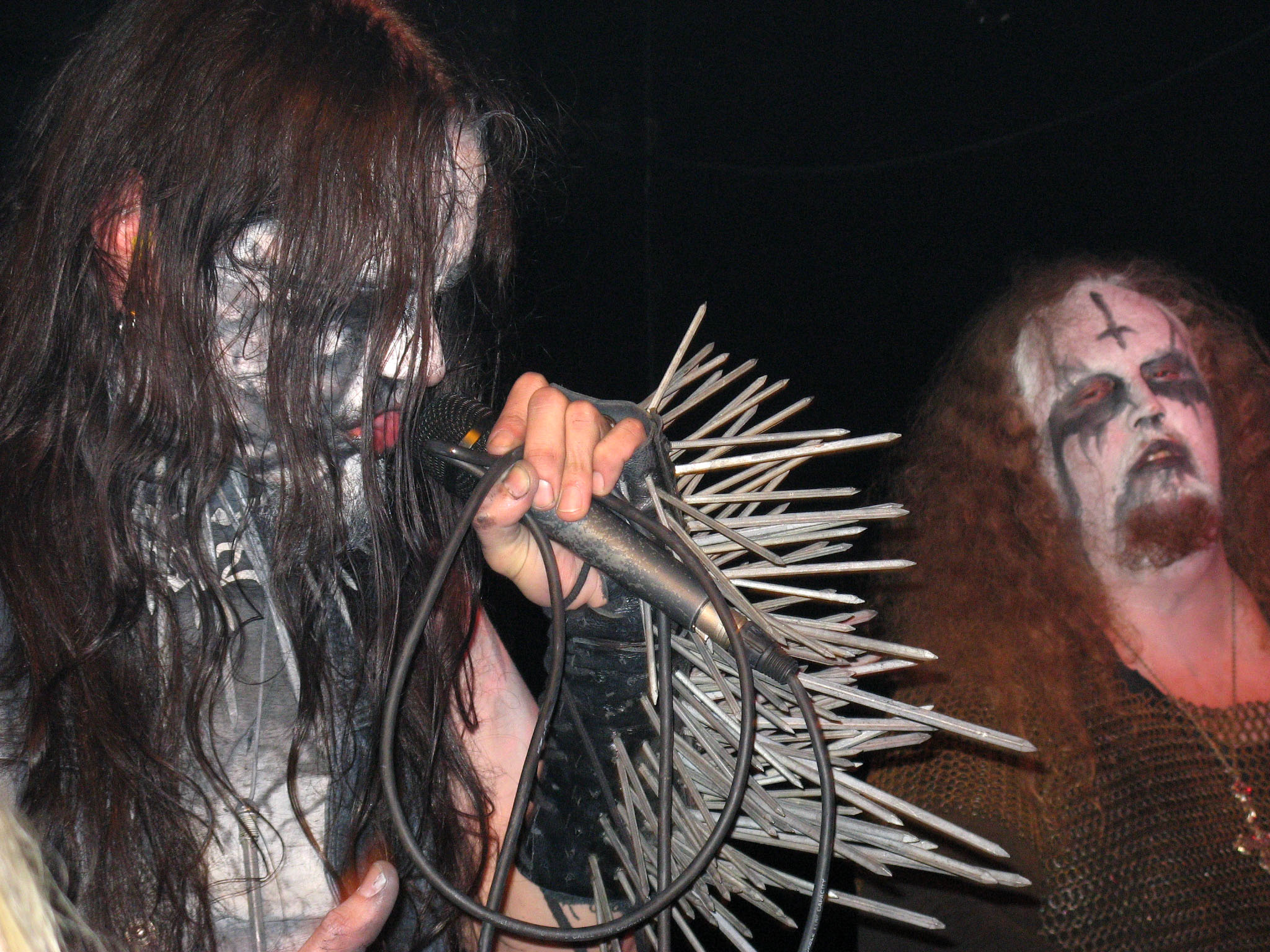
Vocalist Corvus (left) with Horna in 2007

- Moredhel – guitars, bass (1994–2000)
- Gorthaur – drums (1994–2003, 2005)
- Nazgul von Armageddon – lead vocals, keyboards (1996–2001)
- Skratt – bass, keyboards (1997–1998)
- A.T. Otava – bass, guitars (1998–2003)
- Vrasjarn – bass (2000–2001)
- Corvus – lead vocals (2002–2009)
- Saturnus – guitars (2003–2007)
- Vainaja – drums (2007–2016)
- Lord Sargofagian – drums (2007)
- Hex Inferi – bass (2012–2018)

== Discography ==
=== Studio albums ===
- Kohti Yhdeksän Nousua (1998)
- Haudankylmyyden Mailla (1999)
- Sudentaival (2001)
- Envaatnags Eflos Solf Esgantaavne (2005)
- Ääniä Yössä (2006)
- Sotahuuto (2007)
- Sanojesi Äärelle (2008)
- Askel lähempänä Saatanaa (2013)
- Hengen tulet (2015)
- Kasteessa kirottu (2018)
- Kuoleman kirjo (2020)
- Nyx – Hymnejä Yölle (2024)

=== EPs ===
- Sota (1999)
- Perimä Vihassa Ja Verikostossa (1999)
- Korpin Hetki (2002)
- Risti ja Ruoska (2002)
- Viha ja Viikate (2003)
- Talismaani (2004)
- Vuohipaimen (2004)
- Pimeyden Hehku (2007)
- Herran edessä (2009)
- Adventus Satanae (2011)
- Kuolleiden kuu (2018)

=== Splits ===
- Perimä vihassa ja verikostossa / Whispered Myths (1999)
- Horna / Musta Surma (2000)
- Musta Surma / Horna (2002)
- Horna / Desolation Triumphalis (2003)
- Tästä alkavat minun vuoteni / Live Invocation (2003)
- Horna / Woods of Infinity (2004)
- Horna / Behexen (2004)
- Vihan vuodet (2005)
- Goatfucking Gent / Vivicomburium (2005)
- Unohdetut Kasvot, Unohdettu Ääni / Un Sogno Oscuro (2005)
- Horna / Blackdeath (2005)
- Ilman Arvoa ja Arkkua / Kinaidos (2006)
- Horna / Sacrificia Mortuorum (2006)
- Horna / Peste Noire (2007)
- Horna / Nefarious (2009)
- Horna / Den Saakaldte (2014)
- Demonic Christ / Horna (2014)
- Atavistic Resurgence (2015)
- Horna / Pure (2018)
- Horna / Obscure Anachronism (2024)

=== Compilations ===
- Hiidentorni / Perimä Vihassa Ja Verikostossa (2000)
- Ordo Regnum Sathanas (2004)
- Kun Synkkä Ikuisuus Avautuu (2006)
- Musta Kaipuu (2009)

=== Demos ===
- Varjoissa (1995)
- Hiidentorni (1997)

=== Live albums ===
- Black Metal Warfare (2004)
- Vihan tiellä (2009)
- Live Armageddon 1999–2000 (2016)

== Sources ==
- Bécognée, Laurent (October 2008). "Horna – Manifeste Occulte". Metallian (in French) (53). Meylan, France: Metallian Editions: 37. ISSN 1249-2396.
