= Corrupted Ideals =

1988 punk rock band

- Corrupted Ideals in 1993, Anti-Generation album cover

Background information
- Origin: Long Beach, California, United States
- Genres: Hardcore punk, punk rock
- Years active: 1988–1995 2013-Present
- Labels: New Red Archives, Cleopatra Records
- Members: Paul Kelly; Sean Antillon; Steve Swailes; Anthony Guarino
- Past members: Pete Archer; Mike Nigro; Shay "Maister"; Brian Kulesza; Nicky Garratt
- Website: Facebook page

Corrupted Ideals is a punk rock band from Long Beach, California formed in 1988. The band's early line-up, which appeared on their first full-length LP, Join the Resistance, included Paul Kelly and Mike Nigro, on vocals and guitar, respectively.

They wrote most of the material together, with Mike writing most of the music, and Paul contributing most of the lyrics.

== History ==
The band's second release, Anti-Generation, came with a lineup change, including Pete "Action Man" Archer on bass, and Anthony Guarino on drums. Nicky Garratt also played guitar on portions of Anti-Generation, including the CI cover of the UK Subs, "Telephone Numbers."

Pete and Anthony played in another band together in the mid-1980s, called Violent Outrage (a band that played with Corrupted Ideals regularly in the mid-late 1980s. This line up changed slightly a week before touring the Western US, with Pete moving to bass in the Stitches (who were opening for Corrupted Ideals on tour), and Anthony moving to bass, as the band was able to recruit celebrated punk rock drummer Sean Antillon to play drums. Sean is known best for playing drums for the Weirdos, but also has played for the Gears, the Stains, the Skulls, and many other early LA bands who reformed.

The latest Corrupted Ideals lineup included Steve Swailes of the Hitchhikers playing guitar, Paul Kelly on vocals, Anthony Guarino playing bass, and Sean Antillon on drums.

After Corrupted Ideals stopped playing, in 1995, Paul Kelly and Sean Antillon went on to form the Neurotones, along with Steve Swailes. The Neurotones were more stripped down rock, influenced by very early rock and roll, and would be labeled in the genre Rockabilly/Psychobilly.

=== Media ===
Corrupted Ideals were featured in an article in Thrasher Magazine in April 1994. The article was written by Brian Brannon of JFA.

Corrupted Ideals was featured in the April 1994 issue of Thrasher, written by Brian Brannon of JFA

== Discography ==
=== Albums ===
- Join the Resistance - LP (1991)
- Anti-Trend - EP 7-inch (1993)
- Anti-Faction - EP 7-inch (1993)
- Anti-System - EP 7-inch (1993)
- Anti-Generation - (1993)
- V/A Split with "Stitches" and "U.X.A." - Class War in 94', West Coast Tour - EP 7-inch limited to 500 (1994)

=== Appearances ===
- Hardcore Breakout USA Volume 2 (1995)
- Skaters Gear - 6 (1995)
- International P.E.A.C.E. Benefit Compilation CD Reissue (1997)
- At War With Society (1998)
- At War With Society - II (1999)
- Hardcore Breakout USA 1,2,3,... (2003)
