= A Triple Dose of Punk =

A Triple Dose Of Punk

Compilation album by Various Artists
- Released: September 21, 1999
- Genre: Hardcore Punk
- Label: Cleopatra Records
- Producer: Various

Professional ratings
Review scores
Source	Rating
Allmusic	link
Allmusic	link
Allmusic	link

A Triple Dose of Punk is an internationally distributed compilation album mostly of hardcore punk artists from the US and the UK. It was first released in 1999 as a 3 CD, 60 song box set. The album was compiled by Cleopatra Records.

Disc One is a reissue of the 1995 !Action Pact! compilation The Punk Singles Collection, originally released by Captain Oi!. Disc Two is a reissue of the 1996 GBH live album Celebrity Live Style, also released on vinyl as Punked In The O.C. (Live At The Celebrity Theater 1988), both from Cleopatra. Disc Three reissues The Punk, The Bad & The Ugly, a Cleopatra compilation from 1997.

== Track listing ==
=== Disc 1 ===
Punk Singles Collection by !Action Pact! (1995)

1. "London Bouncers"
2. "All Purpose Action Footwear"
3. "Suicide Bag"
4. "Stanwell"
5. "Blue Blood"
6. "People"
7. "Times Must Change"
8. "Sixties Fix"
9. "London Bouncers (B.B. Version)"
10. "Gothic Party Theme"
11. "New Kings Girl"
12. "The Cruellest Thief"
13. "Question of Choice"
14. "Hook Line And Sinker"
15. "Suss of the Swiss"
16. "Yet Another Dole Queue Song"
17. "Rockaway Beach" (Ramones cover)
18. "1974"
19. "Rock N Roll Part 2" (Gary Glitter cover)
20. "Cocktail Credibility"
21. "Consumer Madness"

=== Disc 2 ===
Celebrity Live Style by GBH (1996)

1. "Checkin' Out"
2. "Transylvanian Perfume"
3. "Hearing Screams"
4. "Gunning for the Resident"
5. "To Understand"
6. "20 Floors Below"
7. "A Fridge Too Far"
8. "Sick Boy"
9. "Freak of Nature"
10. "Pass The Axe"
11. "City Baby Attacked By Rats"
12. "City Babies Revenge"
13. "When Will It End"
14. "Alcohol"
15. "I Feel Alright" (Alice Cooper cover)

=== Disc 3 ===
The Punk, The Bad & The Ugly (1997)

1. "Shit Edge" – Christ on a Crutch (1:18)
2. "Police State in the USA" – Anti-Flag (2:40)
3. "Teenage Genocide" – Swingin' Utters (1:41)
4. "War on the Pentagon" – UK Subs (1:48)
5. "Don't Want To Go" – Loudmouths (1:10)
6. "Corporate Life" – Hogan's Heroes (1:10)
7. "Slow Stupid & Hungry" – MDC (1:12)
8. "Rector Breath" – Ultraman (1:57)
9. "Home Sweet Home" – Samiam (1:50)
10. "USA" – Reagan Youth (1:23)
11. "Stop The Production" – Corrupted Ideals (1:27)
12. "Thorn in My Side" – No Use for a Name (2:18)
13. "Flossing with an E String" – Kraut (1:41)
14. "Stab Me in the Back" – Social Unrest (1:12)
15. "Paranoid World Vision" – Christ on a Crutch (1:37)
16. "Friend" – Snap Her (1:16)
17. "Uniform" – Accustomed To Nothing (1:56)
18. "Tenderloin" – The Nukes (3:35)
19. "Messages" – Ultraman (2:36)
20. "Misery" – Squat (2:42)
21. "Telephone Numbers" – Corrupted Ideals (1:05)
22. "Self Defense" – Hogan's Heroes (1:04)
23. "World Overload" – Jack Killed Jill (3:09)
24. "Cleopatra Jingle" – UK Subs (0:40)

== Reception ==
- All Music Guide's Dave Thompson said of Punk Singles "This 21-track roundup showcases every A-side, B-side, and EP track released by the Essex growlers, beginning with the two cuts that debuted them (alongside Dead Man's Shadow) on the Heathrow Touchdown EP in November of 1981. From there, the CD swings into the foreboding roar of "Suicide Bag" (and its chilling B-side, a tribute to hometown Stanwell) and on through the indie hits "London Bouncers," "Question of Choice," and "Yet Another Dole Queue Song," before bidding farewell with the band's final 45, "Cocktail Credibility." In between times, their takes on "Rockaway Beach" and Gary Glitter's "Rock and Roll, Pt. 2" pinpoint the musical influences that fired not only !Action Pact! but the U.K. ... movement in its entirety... there's ... a fury to the commitment that renders this collection an essential acquisition".
- All Music Guide's Greg Prato said of Live Style "Never having any problem capturing the no-holds-barred fury of their wild live gigs in the recording studio, G.B.H.'s studio albums are already quite live-sounding affairs. So unlike most rock bands that release live albums in hopes of livening up their sound further, G.B.H. have pretty much already "been there, done that." ...evidenced by its ...release, ...Live Style, the band has no problem replicating its trademark wall of noise on-stage—the intensity remains the same. Recorded in November 1988, the band thrashes out ...punk classics..., as well as such latter-day tracks as "Transylvanian Perfume." As evidenced by..Live Style, G.B.H. ...undoubtedly one of the great live punk acts..."
- All Music Guide's Jason Ankeny said of The Punk, The Bad, & The Ugly "The 24-track set Punk Bad and Ugly collects rare material from both old school and new school punk rockers".
