= Ultraman (disambiguation) =

Ultraman or Ultra Series is a collective name for all media featuring the Ultraman character.

Ultraman may also refer to:

== Film and television ==
- Ultraman (1966 TV series), tokusatsu television series
- Ultraman (1967 film), a 1967 Japanese tokusatsu kaiju film
- Ultraman (1979 film), a 1979 Japanese tokusatsu kaiju film
- Ultraman (2004 film), a 2004 tokusatsu superhero film

=== Anime ===
- The Ultraman, 1979 Japanese animated television series
- Ultraman (2019 anime), Japanese animated television series

== Comics ==
- Ultraman (DC Comics), any one of several DC Comics supervillainous counterparts of Superman
- Ultraman (manga), a 2010s spin-off sequel manga of the 1960s TV series
- Ultra-Man, a Golden Age of comic books superhero from All-American Publications

== Other uses ==
- Ultraman (character), the Japanese tokusatsu character from the Ultraman series
- Ultraman (band), a punk rock band
- Ultraman (endurance challenge), an endurance sporting event
- Ultraman (video game), a 1994 fighting game based on the 1993 TV series
- Ultraman (wrestler) (born 1947), Mexican professional wrestler
- Ultraman, Andrew's secret identity from My Secret Identity
- Starman (wrestler) (born 1974), Mexican professional wrestler who previously worked as "Ultraman Jr."
