= Snowboard Addiction – Fun Ride =

Snowboard Addiction - Fun Ride

Compilation album by Various Artists
- Released: May 11, 1994
- Genre: Hardcore punk, metalcore
- Label: J!mco Records
- Producer: Various

Snowboard Addiction – Fun Ride is a compilation album mostly of Hardcore Punk artists from USA, and UK. It was originally released in 1994 in Japan as a 24-song CD. The album was compiled by New Red Archives and J!mco Records. The American version Hardcore Breakout USA was compiled and released in 1990.

== Track listing ==
Fun Ride

1. "Jolt" - Ultraman 1:58
2. "Rich" - Jawbreaker 2:58
3. "Indigestion" - Samiam 2:41
4. "Stand Up And Fight" - Bedlam Hour 1:50
5. "Shave Clean" - Crucial Youth 0:53
6. "Full On" - Hogan's Heroes 1:24
7. "New Queen" - Samiam 2:23
8. "Those Who Curse" - Crucial Youth 1:19
9. "Zombies" - Kraut 1:55
10. "You Popped My Life" - G Whizz 2:37
11. "Threat Of Power" - Squat 2:06
12. "Its About Time" - Agitators 1:40
13. "Turn To Ice" - Ultraman 2:14
14. "Home Sweet Home" - Samiam 1:53
15. "Unemployed" - Kraut 2:17
16. "Positive Dental Outlook" - Crucial Youth 0:51
17. "Megalopolis" - UK Subs 1:55
18. "Breaking Your Rules" - Hogan's Heroes 3:59
19. "Underground" - Samiam 3:40
20. "Sabre Dance" - UK Subs 3:13
21. "Reagan Youth" - Reagan Youth 1:19
22. "Last Will" - Hogan's Heroes 1:49
23. "Juvenile Justice" - Kraut 2:17
24. "Frog Song" - P.E.D. 0:49
