= Hogan's Heroes (album) =

Studio album by Hogan's Heroes
- Released: May 18, 1990
- Recorded: October – November 1989, Sonic Edge, New York City
- Genres: Hardcore punk, reggae rock, heavy metal
- Length: 37:37
- Language: English
- Label: New Red Archives
- Producers: Hogan's Heroes, Ryk Oakley

Hogan's Heroes chronology
Built to Last (1988)	Hogan's Heroes (1990)	3 Fists and a Mouthful (1992)

Hogan's Heroes is the eponymously titled second studio album by the American hardcore punk band Hogan's Heroes and was released on May 18, 1990, through New Red Archives. It was recorded at Saatchi & Saatchi's Sonic Edge Studios. It was Produced by Hogan's Heroes and Ryk Oakley.

== Album information ==
The album was recorded in 1989 at advertising agency Saatchi & Saatchi, in New York City. In August 1989 after recording basic tracks, Cuccinello moved to Florida for ten months, Hogan's Heroes (Barberio, Scandiffio, Hoefling) produced the Import/Caroline/Rough Trade distributed release with Ryk Oakley (Kraut, UK Subs). After a summer of shows, in August 1990, Cuccinello (bass) left the group for Florida and was replaced by Brian Brain Mooney. Hogan's Heroes continued to play gigs eventually parting with Tony Scandiffio (drums) May 1991.

The album's cover showed a live aid concert . The visual effect is of a painted upside down photo.

== Reception ==
In Maximum RockNRolls', The Record Review, Tim Yohannan, founder of Maximum Rocknroll (MRR), said about Hogan's Heroes ...... "This is their second, on which they do HC, reggae, rock and metal influenced punk and more. Varied, well done..."

In the January Top 10 issue East Coast Rocker said Hogan's Heroes "Top 10 New Jersey, Independent Release of 1990..."

== Songs ==
With the exception of, "First", "Let's Rock", "Righteous", "Breaking Your Rules", "Kalm", "She's Gone", and "Full On", all of the material for Hogan's Heroes was written before 1989.

== Track listing ==
No.	Title	Length
1.	"First"	4:09
2.	"Soulsight"	1:55
3.	"Let's Rock"	2:25
4.	"Kick it In"	2:00
5.	"Righteous"	2:05
6.	"Breaking Your Rules"	4:01
7.	"Dread Or Alive"	5:59
8.	"So Lonely / Green"	1:19
9.	"Kalm"	2:09
10.	"She's Gone"	7:22
11.	"†††"	4:14

Compilation bonus track

No.	Title	Length
12.	"Full On"	1:24

== Personnel ==
- George Barberio – lead guitar, vocals
- John Cuccinello – bass
- Tony Scandiffio – drums, vocals
- Skip Hoefling – vocals

=== Production ===
- Produced by Hogan's Heroes (Barberio, Scandiffio, Hoefling) and Ryk Oakley
- Recorded and mixed by Ryk Oakley
