= Hogan's Heroes (disambiguation) =

Hogan's Heroes is an American television sitcom that ran from September 17, 1965, to March 28, 1971.

Hogan's Heroes may also refer to:

- Hogan's Heroes (band), an American hardcore punk band
- Hogan's Heroes (album), the second studio album from the band Hogan's Heroes
