= Hardcore Breakout USA =

Compilation album by Various Artists
- Released: 1990
- Genres: Hardcore Punk, metalcore
- Length: 47:20
- Label: New Red Archives
- Producer: Various

Hardcore Breakout USA is an internationally distributed compilation album, mostly of artists that are on New Red Archives records. It was originally released in 1990 as a double LP and cassette then subsequently released as a CD. The album was compiled by New Red Archives. The New Red Archives 1990 pressing of the album was issued as a single LP. The Japanese version Snowboard Addiction - Fun Ride, was released in 1994 and a second edition, Hardcore Breakout USA Volume 2, was compiled and released, in 1995.

== Track listing ==
=== Hardcore Breakout USA ===
Part 1

1. "Jolt" - Ultraman 1:58
2. "Rich" - Jawbreaker 2:58
3. "Indigestion" - Samiam 2:41
4. "Stand Up And Fight" - Bedlam Hour 1:50
5. "Shave Clean" - Crucial Youth 0:53
6. "Full On" - Hogan's Heroes 1:24
7. "New Queen" - Samiam 2:23
8. "Those Who Curse" - Crucial Youth 1:19
9. "Zombies" - Kraut 1:55
10. "You Popped My Life" - G Whizz 2:37
11. "Threat Of Power" - Dirge 2:06
12. "Its About Time" - Agitators 1:40

Part 2

1. "Turn To Ice" - Ultraman 2:14
2. "Home Sweet Home" - Samiam 1:53
3. "Unemployed" - Kraut 2:17
4. "Positive Dental Outlook" - Crucial Youth 0:51
5. "Megalopolis" - UK Subs 1:55
6. "Breaking Your Rules" - Hogan's Heroes 3:59
7. "Underground" - Samiam 3:40
8. "Sabre Dance" - UK Subs 3:13
9. "Reagan Youth" - Reagan Youth 1:19
10. "Last Will" - Hogan's Heroes 1:49
11. "Juvenile Justice" - Kraut 2:17
12. "Frog Song" - P.E.D. 0:49

=== New Red Archives ===
1. "Turn To Ice" - Ultraman 2:14
2. "Home Sweet Home" - Samiam 1:53
3. "Unemployed" - Kraut 2:17
4. "Positive Dental Outlook" - Crucial Youth 0:51
5. "Megalopolis" - UK Subs 1:55
6. "Breaking Your Rules" - Hogan's Heroes 3:59
7. "Underground" - Samiam 3:40
8. "Sabre Dance" - UK Subs 3:13
9. "Reagan Youth" - Reagan Youth 1:19
10. "Last Will" - Hogan's Heroes 1:49
11. "Juvenile Justice" - Kraut 2:17
12. "Frog Song" - P.E.D. 0:49

== Reception ==
- Maximum RockNRoll's founder Tim Yohannan said of Hardcore Breakout USA "...current Top 15 list"
- Maximum RockNRoll's Walter Glaser said of Hardcore Breakout USA "...current Top 15 list"
- Maximum RockNRoll's Martin Sprouse said of Hardcore Breakout USA "...current Top 15 list"

=== Uncredited ===
- George Barberio - album and CD covers
- Noah Uman - front cover photography
