= 3 Fists and a Mouthful =

Studio album by Hogan's Heroes
- Released: June 22, 1992
- Recorded: September–December 1991, Ocean Gate, New Jersey
- Genres: Hardcore punk, skatecore
- Length: 28:22
- Language: English
- Label: New Red Archives
- Producer: George Barberio

Hogan's Heroes chronology
Hogan's Heroes (1990)	3 Fists and a Mouthful (1992)

3 Fists and a Mouthful is the third studio album by the American hardcore punk band Hogan's Heroes. It was released in January 1992 on advanced promo copies. Produced by George Barberio, and recorded at Ocean Gate Studios (Nelson, Alice Cooper) the album showcased the band's full use of hardcore, rock, full-band backing vocals, while fusing elements of punk, thrash and metal. The album was partially re-released in 1995 in a Revolver/Rotz/Smash/Dutch East distributed, remastered version.

== Album information ==
The album received favorable reviews and was considered to be their best release. Many of the album's songs are from old demos, unreleased, and new material, including "Corporate Life", "Self Defense" and "Cold".

The production was handled by guitarist George Barberio and Damian Kain co-produced and engineered. The working title for the album was Three. The original art and cover layout was never commercially released and differs greatly from the cover that was released in 1995.

In 1994, a compilation album 101/3 Fists and a Mouthful was released, which contains additional new material with many original tracks of 3 Fists and a Mouthful. The 1994 material, produced by Hogans Heroes and Ryk Oakley was recorded at Sonic Edge and Excello Studios.

== Reception ==
Thrasher Magazine, The Rickter Scale said about 3 Fists and a Mouthful ...... "Hogans Heroes, Lp. Great skatecore by veteran Heroes. Their best yet-hard, fast, and fun, the way it should be...".

East Coast Rocker, Current Vinyl said about 3 Fists and a Mouthful...... "still a lot of hardcore going on..."....."sounds like groove meditation after primal shock therapy..." ".....change tempos like a horny....date changes panties.." "more like slow, burnin' sex with the wife of a screaming bald idiot. who's chasing after you with a machete...".

== Track listing (3 Fists and a Mouthful) ==
No.	Title	Length
1.	"Corporate Life"	1:09
2.	"Self Defense"	1:02
3.	"One Intent"	2:26
4.	"Spiderbite"	1:49
5.	"Moonblanket" (Instrumental)	2:14
6.	"Cold"	2:32
7.	"Bleeding blind"	4:45
8.	"Scram"	1:11
9.	"Standing Alone"	2:30
10.	"Something"	3:08
11.	"Slow-Gin Senorita/Midday Fantasy"	4:16
12.	"Spiderbite" (Reprise)	2:40

Compilation bonus track

No.	Title	Length
13.	"Fill it Up"	2:15

== Track listing (101/3 Fists and a Mouthful) ==
Newly recorded tracks

No.	Title	Length
1.	"That One"	4:18
2.	"Sprayed Against The Wall"	5:09
3.	"Lies"	3:45
4.	"101"	4:42
5.	"Standing Alone"	3:01

3 Fists and a mouthful reused tracks

No.	Title	Length
6.	"Corporate Life"	1:09
7.	"Self Defense"	1:02
8.	"Spiderbite (Reprise)"	2:40
9.	"One Intent"	2:26
10.	"Bleeding Blind"	4:39
11.	"Scram"	1:11

Compilation bonus tracks

No.	Title	Length
12.	"Fill it Up"	2:15
13.	"Cold"	2:32

== Personnel ==
- George Barberio – lead guitar, vocals
- George Barberio – bass: on tracks 3–5, 7–9, 12 & 13
- John Cuccinello – bass: on tracks 1, 2, 6, 10 & 11
- George Barberio – drums, vocals on "Something"
- Skip Hoefling – vocals

=== Uncredited ===
- George Barberio, Skip Hoefing, Damian Kain – back up vocals
- George Barberio – wind chimes (on "MoonBlanket" "Bleeding Blind")
- George Barberio – sleigh bells (on "Spiderbite" – reprise)

=== Production ===
- Produced by George Barberio
- Recorded and mixed by Damian Kain
