= Built to Last (Hogan's Heroes album) =

Studio album by Hogan's Heroes
- Released: May 27, 1988
- Recorded: November 1987, Waterfront Studios, New Jersey
- Genre: Hardcore punk, blues rock
- Length: 21:28
- Language: English
- Label: New Red Archives
- Producer: Hogan's Heroes

Hogan's Heroes chronology
Built to Last (1988)	Hogan's Heroes (1990)

Built to Last is the debut album by American hardcore punk band Hogan's Heroes. It was recorded at Waterfront Studios.

== Album information ==
The album was recorded at Lenny Kravitz / Henry Hirsch Waterfront Studios, Hoboken, New Jersey and engineered by Rae Dileo. The album was originally released on Straight-On Records in 1988. It was reissued in May 1989 through Caroline Records.

== Reception ==
East Coast Rockers' Makin' Waves said of "Built to Last "...hardcore roots" "...there's some really cool true blues rock 'n' roll on Built to Last..."

Kent McClard's No Answers No. 6 said "Built to Last contained "...scathing hardcore with extremely metallic guitar riffing" and that it was "explosive sounding".

== Track listing ==
No.	Title	Length
1.	"Inner Strength"	2:02
2.	"Change"	2:01
3.	"Influenced"	2:02
4.	"State Vegetable"	1:00
5.	"Last Will"	1:42
6.	"Stuck In a Rut"	2:52
7.	"Better Youth"	1:29
8.	"Built to Last"	1:57
9.	"Mr. Clean"	2:04
10.	"Zombies"	1:15
11.	"Drugz"	1:19
12.	"False Nadar"	1:22
13.	"And..."	1:43

== Personnel ==
- George Barberio – lead guitar, vocals
- John Cuccinello – bass, vocals
- Tony Scandiffio – drums, vocals
- Skip Hoefling – vocals

=== Production ===
- Produced by Hogan's Heroes
- Recorded and mixed by Rae Dileo
