= The Punk, the Bad & the Ugly =

The Punk, The Bad & The Ugly

Compilation album by Various Artists
- Released: March 11, 1997
- Genre: Hardcore punk, heavy metal, punk rock, metalcore
- Length: 42:16
- Label: Cleopatra Records
- Producer: Various

Professional ratings
Review scores
Source	Rating
Allmusic	link

The Punk, The Bad & The Ugly is an internationally distributed compilation album mostly of artists from USA, and UK. It was originally released in 1997 as a 24 song CD. The album was compiled by Cleopatra Records.

== Track listing ==
Part 1

1. "Shit Edge" - Christ on a Crutch 1:18
2. "Police State In The USA" - Anti-Flag 2:40
3. "Teenage Genocide" - Swingin' Utters 1:41
4. "War On The Pentagon" - UK Subs 1:48
5. "Don't Want To Go" - Loudmouths 1:10
6. "Corporate Life"- Hogan's Heroes 1:10
7. "Slow Stupid & Hungry" - MDC 1:12
8. "Rector Breath" - Ultraman 1:57
9. "Home Sweet Home" - Samiam 1:50
10. "USA"- Reagan Youth 1:23
11. "Stop The Production" - Corrupted Ideals 1:27
12. "Thorn In My Side" - No Use For A Name 2:18

Part 2

1. "Flossing With An E String"- Kraut 1:41
2. "Stab Me In The Back" - Social Unrest 1:12
3. "Paranoid World Vision" - Christ on a Crutch 1:37
4. "Friend" - Snap Her 1:16
5. "Uniform" - Accustomed To Nothing 1:56
6. "Tenderloin" - The Nukes 3:35
7. "Messages" - Ultraman 2:36
8. "Misery" - Squat 2:42
9. "Telephone Numbers" - Corrupted Ideals 1:05
10. "Self Defense" - Hogan's Heroes 1:04
11. "World Overload" - Jack Killed Jill 3:09
12. "Cleopatra Jingle" - UK Subs 0:40

== Reception ==
- All Music Guide's Jason Ankeny said of The Punk, The Bad & The Ugly that it was "rare material from both old school and new school punk rockers".
