= Another Kind of Blues =

Studio album by U.K. Subs
- Released: September 14, 1979
- Recorded: May 29, - June 1979
- Studio: Kingsway Recorders Ltd., London
- Genre: Punk rock
- Length: 35:55
- Label: RCA
- Producer: John McCoy, U.K. Subs

U.K. Subs chronology
Another Kind of Blues (1979)	Brand New Age (1980)

Professional ratings
Review scores
Source	Rating
AllMusic	4.5/5 stars

Another Kind of Blues is the first studio album released by English punk rock band, the U.K. Subs. It was released in the UK on 14 September 1979 on GEM Records, a subsidiary of RCA. It is considered a classic from the punk era. Produced at Kingsway Studio by John McCoy.

The style of music borrows heavily from blues, R&B and rock'n'roll but infused much of the energy and social commentary that was shaping the wider punk rock scene.

Critics were divided on the album's merits. Writing for the New Musical Express, Charles Shaar Murray described the album as being "As appetising as the tea-bag left to dry on the saucer" , while in Sounds, Garry Bushell awarded the album five stars and called it "a near perfect slice of good time high energy punk."

The first 20,000 copies were printed on blue vinyl and the album reached number 21 in the UK album charts.

The U.K. Subs have released 26 official albums, each beginning with a different letter of the alphabet. Their most recent, Ziezo, was released in 2016.

== Track listing ==
- All songs written by Nicky Garratt and Charlie Harper, except where noted.

No.	Title	Writer(s)	Length
1.	"C.I.D."	Harper, Richard Anderson	2:10
2.	"I Couldn't Be You"	John Barrie Presley; arranged by Charlie Harper	2:06
3.	"I Live in a Car"	Harper, Garratt, Paul Slack, Rory Lions	1:36
4.	"Tomorrows Girls"	Harper	2:24
5.	"Killer"	Harper, Garratt, Slack	1:28
6.	"World War"		1:06
7.	"Rockers"		3:15
8.	"I.O.D."		1:22
9.	"T.V. Blues"	Harper, Garratt, Slack	2:08
10.	"Blues"		1:50
11.	"Lady Esquire"		1:50
12.	"All I Wanna Know"	Harper, Garratt, Slack	1:48
13.	"Crash Course"	Harper, John McCoy, Garratt	1:40
14.	"Young Criminals"		2:18
15.	"B.I.C."		1:35
16.	"Disease"		1:25
17.	"Stranglehold"	Harper	2:26

== Personnel ==
UK Subs

- Charlie Harper – lead vocals, harmonica
- Nicky Garratt – guitar, backing vocals
- Paul Slack – bass
- Pete Davies – drums

Additional personnel

- Bob Broglia – engineer
- Paul "Chas" Watkins and Bob Broglia – mixing engineers
- Hothouse – sleeve
- Paul Canty, Yuka Fujii and Tony MacLean – photography
