= Mighty Attack =

1999 compilation album

Compilation album by Various Artists
- Released: 1999
- Genre: Hardcore punk
- Label: Flavour Records
- Producer: Various

Mighty Attack is a compilation album mostly of hardcore punk artists from USA, and UK. It was originally released in 1999 in Japan as a 33 song CD. The album was compiled by Flavour Records. The American version was compiled and released in 1998.

== Track listing ==
=== Mighty Attack ===
Disc 1

1. "Its Your Right" - The Wretch 2:45
2. "Nobody Move" - UK Subs 1:34
3. "Police State In The USA" - Anti-Flag 2:40
4. "Stop The Production" - Corrupted Ideals 1:25
5. "DMV" - No Use For A Name 3:08
6. "Be My Girl" - Snap Her 2:07
7. "Degenerated" - Reagan Youth 1:22
8. "State Of Alert" - UK Subs 0:50
9. "Loose Interpretation Of The Bomb" - Accustomed To Nothing 2:59
10. "No Guts" - Loudmouths 1:59
11. "Born Addicted" - No Use For A Name 2:39
12. "USA"- Reagan Youth 1:20
13. "All Laced Up" - Swingin' Utters 2:46
14. "Die For The Government" - Anti-Flag 3:40
15. "Thinking Of Suicide - Social Unrest 1:45
16. "Its All Over" - Squat 2:03
17. "The Bridge" - Samiam 3:20
18. "Flossing With An E String" - Kraut 1:40
19. "Slow Stupid & Hungry" - MDC 1:11
20. "Corporate Life" - Hogan's Heroes 1:10
21. "I Dont Care" - Corrupted Ideals 2:17
22. "Tenderloin" - The Nukes 3:35
23. "Home" - 2 Line Filler 3:18
24. "In Need Of A Holiday" - Jack Killed Jill 3:06
25. "Reggae Gets Big In A Small Town" - Swingin' Utters 1:33
26. "Colossal Sleep" - Social Unrest 1:42
27. "I Wanna Beavis You" - Snap Her 3:15
28. "To You" - Dehumanized 2:58
29. "Regret" - Samiam 3:49
30. "Positive Dental Outlook" - Crucial Youth 0:49
31. "Food For Thought" - Christ on a Crutch 1:23
32. "Loony Toon" - No Use For A Name 1:49
33. "NRA Jingle" - UK Subs 0:39
