= Ultraman (band) =

American punk rock band

- Origin: Missouri
- Genres: Hardcore punk
- Years active: 1986–1991; 1999–2005
- Label: New Red Archives
- Past members: Tim Jamison; Rob Wagoner; John Corcoran; Bob Zuellig; Mike Doskocil; Mark Deniszuk; Pat Hercules; Mike Story; Matt Smith

Ultraman are a punk rock band from St. Louis, Missouri, formed in 1986, with members Tim Jamison (vocals), Rob Wagoner (guitar), John Corcoran (bass), Bob Zuellig (guitar), and Mike Doskocil (drums).

== History ==
Ultraman first released their own 7-inch EP (alternately called the Mr. Yuk 7 and self-titled) in 1988 after selling demo tapes for over a year. Their second 7-inch EP "Destroys All Monsters...Kills All Families" was recorded in May 1988, but not released until September of that year. The EP features the same lineup, except Mark Deniszuk replaced Mike Doskocil on drums. During this time, Ultraman played countless shows in St. Louis at notable venues such as Mississippi Nights (the first show played here was with Suicidal Tendencies. They would follow up this show by playing with bands as diverse as the Exploited and Dead Milkmen. Ultraman also frequently played the surrounding Midwestern region, with many shows in Lawrence, Kansas, at the famed Outhouse.

Ultraman expanded their Midwestern focus and decided to promote the singles with an east coast tour in July 1988. On this tour, Ultraman played dates in Leonardtown, Maryland, with McRad (Chuck Treece’s band while he was also in Underdog), Boston, and New York City (at the Pyramid Club). After this tour, singer Tim Jamison sent a copy of the band's single and band t-shirts to Jack at Caroline Records, in the hope of getting the band signed. Jack didn't think they were a fit with the label, but passed along their singles to Nicky Garrett who, at the time, ran the Caroline warehouse and was just starting New Red Archives. New Red Archives had already signed the UK Subs, east coast bands Crucial Youth and Kraut, and was looking for a Midwestern band who had both name recognition and had toured.

=== Freezing Inside ===
In late 1988, Garrett offered to sign Ultraman to his NRA label and asked the band to record their first album. At this time, Bob Zeulig was replaced by Mike Story. After signing to New Red Archives the band traveled to New York to record their first album. "Freezing Inside" was recorded at famed ad agency Saatchi & Saatchi in their 15th floor studio, using the same microphone that was used to record Trix cereal commercials. The album was produced by Tom Lyle of Government Issue in 1989. To promote the album, Ultraman toured the west coast with another St. Louis band, Whoppers Taste Good then the east coast and Canada with UK Subs.

=== Non Existence and Breakup ===
In 1990, the band learned they would be touring Europe with Samiam and went into the studio to record a new album in preparation for the tour. During this time, Mike Story was briefly replaced by Pat Hercules for some live shows, but he was eventually replaced by Matt Smith to record the next album and subsequent European tour. The second album, "Non Existence" was produced by Nicky Garrett and recorded in San Francisco. During the recording, Ultraman played 924 Gilman Street. After several more U.S. shows, the band headed off to Europe to play Germany, Austria, Yugoslavia, Italy, Switzerland, the Netherlands, France, and England with punk band Samiam. Ultraman decided to call this tour "European In Your Pants."

After the tour Ultraman returned to the U.S. to play live shows throughout the country. In February 1991, Rick Ulrich from Whoppers Taste Good replaced Matt Smith. Ultraman was set to go back to Europe for another tour, and John John replaced John Corcoran on bass for this leg. Ultraman toured solo on this 1991 tour, playing shows in the Netherlands, Belgium, Germany and Austria. They returned to America once again, but this time broke up. They played a final, sold-out show at legendary Mississippi Nights on December 30, 1991.

=== The Constant Weight of Zero and Reformation ===
While formally broken up, Ultraman still played dozens of reunion shows throughout the Midwest. In 1999, the band officially re-formed, with the lineup of Tim Jamison on vocals, John John on bass, Tim O'Saben on guitar, Bob Fancher on guitar and Jason Simpson on drums. This incarnation of Ultraman continued to play shows in St. Louis while writing new songs. The band has always been one of St. Louis's most requested opening acts for touring punk and hardcore punk bands that came to play in the region.

By 2001, Rob Wagoner returned to the band, replacing Tim O'Saben. This lineup would record the album "The Constant Weight of Zero," which was released in 2004.

As of 2015 Rob Wagoner and John John left the band. Tim O'Saben returned to guitar and Ryan Meszaros took over on bass. In the meantime Ultraman has continued to play a few shows per year in St. Louis, Chicago, Kansas City and Lawrence, KS. They are currently working on new songs and set to record in the first quarter of 2021.

The current line up of St. Louis, MO based punk rock band Ultraman for the last eleven years is Tim Jamison vocals and founding member 1986, Bob Fancher guitar 1999, Tim O'Saben guitar returned in 2015 after leaving for the return of Rob Wagoner in 2001, Gabe Usery drums since 2010 and Ryan Meszaros bass since 2015. As of 2024 Ultraman released a new album on Rad Girlfriend records, did a short four day tour in June of 2025 as well as several local shows in St. Louis. At the end of 2025 Ultraman opened for Dazzling Killmen in St. Louis. This comes full circle since Dazzling Killmen shared the stage many times in 1991.

The band was formed 40 years ago April 1986 and has several plans to celebrate that fact with the re-release of the original demo cassette, re-recording live in studio version of songs from the first three albums over the year and Rad Girlfriend has agreed to re-release the first two 7" records as a gate fold 7".

== Discography ==
Albums

- 1988 Freezing Inside
- 1990 Non-Existence
- 2004 The Constant Weight of Zero
- 2012 Ultra Dash split with Dot Dash
- 2024 Dead End Thoughts Under A Crawling Sky

Compilation appearances:

- 1990 Hardcore Breakout USA
- 1990 New Red Archives
- 1995 Hardcore Breakout USA Volume 2
- 1998 At War With Society
- 1999 A Triple Dose Of Punk
