= Hogan's Heroes (band) =

American hardcore punk band

- Origin: New Jersey, United States
- Genres: Hardcore punk, skate punk
- Years active: 1984–1993
- Labels: Straight-On Records, New Red Archives, Cleopatra Records,
- Past members: George Barberio; John Cuccinello; Skip Hoefling; Tony Scandiffio

Hogan's Heroes was an American hardcore punk band formed in New Jersey in 1984. During their time they recorded three full lengths for California label New Red Archives. The band broke up in 1993.

== History ==
=== Early years (1984–1986) ===
Hogan's Heroes was formed in the shore area of South Central, New Jersey in 1984 by George Barberio (lead guitar), Matt Gunvordahl (drums), and Scott Cassidy (vocals). After a short stint as Impossible Task, the band added bassist John Cuccinello who wanted to call the band Hogan's Heroes. In 1985 the band released their first demo Hogan's Heroes, which was co produced with local N.J. producer Merlin. In August 1985 Cuccinello (bass) left the group and moved to California. Hogan's Heroes continued to play gigs and recorded a new demo with bass player Gerry Daseking in December 1985, Bomb Guy Demo, which was again co produced with local N.J. producer Merlin. The underground tape trading wave of the early 1980s led to extensive distribution of the demos, bringing the band some attention.

In July 1986, Cuccinello had rejoined and Gunvodahl and Cassidy had left the group. In November 1986 Barberio and Cuccinello made a new 13 song recording with new members Tony Scandiffio (drums) and Skip Hoefling (vocals). This was recorded at Merlin Studios and Produced by Hogan's Heroes and Merlin.

=== Built To Last (1987–1988) ===
In 1987, the band produced and recorded songs for Built To Last at Waterfront Studios with Rae Dileo engineering. The album mixes hardcore with elements of hard rock, thrash, and metal.

After a deal with another label did not materialize, Straight-On records released Hogan's Heroes' debut album, Built To Last, in 1988. The album sold well and secured the band distribution through Caroline Records.

=== Hogan's Heroes (1989–1990) ===
In early 1989 the band switched record labels. The success of Built To Last on Straight-On led to a record deal with New Red Archives (UK Subs, Kraut, Reagan Youth), who immediately reissued the band's debut album, Built To Last, on multiple formats in 1989.

After New Red Archives Records acquired the band from Straight-On in 1989, they signed Hogan's Heroes to a two-record deal and released the eponymously titled second studio album, Hogan's Heroes, on multiple formats in 1990. Hogan's Heroes (Barberio, Scandiffio, Hoefling) produced the Import/Caroline/Rough Trade distributed release with Ryk Oakley (Kraut, UK Subs), where it was recorded in 1989. The album showcased the band's use of mixing hardcore with elements of punk, thrash, reggae, metal, and utilizing full-band backing vocals, which gave the album a varied feel.

=== 3 Fists and a Mouthful (1991–1992) ===
In 1991, the band signed a new contract with New Red Archives Records and in mid-1991 recorded songs for 3 Fists and a Mouthful. Produced by George Barberio, and recorded at Ocean Gate Studios the album showcased the band's hardcore and hard rock style, with elements of punk, thrash and metal.

== Style and legacy ==
They have been classed under the genre of skate punk, which is a fusion of hardcore punk with skateboard culture. Their music is described by Razorcake in April 2006 as "fast 'n' furious, pissed off, ...holds up consistently well, managing to get the blood pumping just as well as it did a decade and a half ago".

== Members ==
- George Barberio – guitar
- John Cuccinello – bass guitar
- Tony Scandiffio – drums
- Skip Hoefling – vocals

== Discography ==
Studio albums

- Built to Last (1988)
- Hogan's Heroes (1990)
- 3 Fists and a Mouthful (1992)
- 101/3 Fists and a Mouthful (1995)

Compilation album appearances

- Hardcore Breakout USA (1990)
- New Red Archives (1990)
- Snowboard Addiction - Fun Ride (1994 Japan)
- Skaters Gear - 6 (1995 Japan)
- Hardcore Breakout USA Volume 2 (1995)
- The Punk, The Bad & The Ugly (1997)
- At War With Society (1998)
- Punk Breakout USA (1998 Japan)
- At War With Society - II (1999)
- A Triple Dose Of Punk (1999) 3-CD Set
- Mighty Attack (1999 Japan)
- Hardcore Breakout USA 1,2,3,... (2004) 3-CD Set
- Hardcore Breakout - Essential Punk (2012)
