= Brand New Age =

Studio album by U.K. Subs
- Released: 11 April 1980
- Recorded: January 1980
- Studios: Underhill Studios, New Cross, London
- Genres: Punk rock, hardcore punk
- Length: 29:57
- Label: GEM Records
- Producers: Charlie Harper, Nicky Garratt

U.K. Subs chronology
Another Kind of Blues (1979)	Brand New Age (1980)	Crash Course (1980)

Professional ratings
Review scores
Source	Rating
AllMusic	.

Brand New Age is the second studio album released by English punk rock band the U.K. Subs. It was released in 1980 on RCA/GEM Records. It is the U.K. Subs' most successful studio recording, reaching number 18 in the UK album charts and staying in the chart for nine weeks.

The album saw the band expand both musically and lyrically, taking on subjects such as government intrusion, violence and religious fundamentalism, terrorism, as well as established Subs themes of alcohol, drugs, motorbikes, girls and youth subcultures.

Brand New Age included two hit singles; "Warhead", warning of the danger of the Cold War and the growing threat of Islamic Jihadism in Afghanistan, and which reached number 30 in the UK singles charts in March 1980; and "Teenage", which reached 32 in the UK charts in May 1980.

== Critical reception ==
The album was awarded five stars by Sounds magazine writer Garry Bushell, and four stars in Record Mirror, though as Alex Ogg wrote later, "the band might as well have not existed for all the attention trendier publications like the NME would afford them". The mixed reception did not trouble band leader Charlie Harper. Speaking to Rising Free Fanzine, Harper said he was pleased with the album's critical reception; "I really like the second album, more than the first one. I thought it was a good one. So I was more than happy with the reviews".

More recently, AllMusic reviewer Victor W. Valdivia praised Brand New Age for its ambition and lyrical depth; "The UK Subs came of age on this album, and proved they were one of the best, most promising acts of their era," he wrote.

== Track list ==
- All songs written by Charlie Harper and Nicky Garratt, except where noted.

No.	Title	Writer(s)	Length
1.	"You Can't Take It Anymore"	Harper, Garratt, Slack, Davies	1.59
2.	"Brand New Age"		1:32
3.	"Public Servant"		2:15
4.	"Warhead"	Harper, Slack	3:20
5.	"Barbie's Dead"	Harper, Slack	2:19
6.	"Organised Crime"		2:06
7.	"Rat Race"		1:58
8.	"Emotional Blackmail"		2:44
9.	"Kicks"		1:51
10.	"Teenage"	Harper	2:31
11.	"Dirty Girls"		1:48
12.	"500cc"	Harper, Garratt, Slack	2:15
13.	"Bomb Factory"		2:11
14.	"Emotional Blackmail II"		1:08

== Personnel ==
UK Subs

- Charlie Harper – vocals.
- Nicky Garratt – guitar.
- Paul Slack – bass guitar.
- Pete Davies – drums.

Additional personnel

- Laurie Dipple – engineer
- Tim Smith – design
- Paul Slattery – photography
