= At War with Society =

At War With Society

Compilation album by Various Artists
- Released: 1998, 1999
- Genres: Hardcore punk, metalcore
- Labels: New Red Archives, New Red Archives/PHD
- Producer: Various

At War With Society II
- Alternative Cover

Professional ratings
Review scores
Source	Rating
AllMusic	3/5 stars

At War with Society is an internationally distributed compilation album mostly of artists that are on New Red Archives records. It was originally released in 1998 as a 33-song CD, but was subsequently released on CD with one less track. The album was compiled by New Red Archives. As of May 1999, it had reached sales of 77,000+ copies. The second version of the album (on New Red Archives/PHD Records) was issued with an alternate cover. The second version was compiled and released in 1999.

== Track listing ==
=== At War With Society ===
Disc 1

1. "Fish People" - Christ on a Crutch 2:08
2. "State Of Alert" - UK Subs 0:50
3. "Loose Interpretation Of The Bomb" - Accustomed To Nothing 2:59
4. "No Guts" - Loudmouths 1:59
5. "Born Addicted" - No Use For A Name 2:39
6. "USA"- Reagan Youth 1:20
7. "All Laced Up" - Swingin' Utters 2:46
8. "Die For The Government" - Anti-Flag 3:40
9. "Thinking Of Suicide" - Social Unrest 1:45
10. "Its All Over" - Squat 2:03
11. "The Bridge" - Samiam 3:20
12. "Be My Girl" - Snap Her 2:07
13. "Flossing With An E String" - Kraut 1:40
14. "Stop The Production" - Corrupted Ideals 1:25
15. "DMV" - No Use For A Name 3:08
16. "Messages" - Ultraman 2:35
17. "Slow Stupid & Hungry" - MDC 1:11
18. "Corporate Life" - Hogan's Heroes 1:10
19. "I Dont Care" - Corrupted Ideals 2:17
20. "Tenderloin" - The Nukes 3:34
21. "Nobody Move" - UK Subs 1:33
22. "Home" - 2 Line Filler 3:18
23. "In Need Of A Holiday" - Jack Killed Jill 3:06
24. "Sky Flying By" - Samiam 3:58
25. "Reggae Gets Big In A Small Town" - Swingin' Utters 1:33
26. "Its Your Right" - The Wretch 2:45
27. "Colossal Sleep" - Social Unrest 1:42
28. "I Wanna Beavis You" - Snap Her 3:15
29. "To You" - Dehumanized 2:58
30. "Regret" - Samiam 3:49
31. "Positive Dental Outlook" - Crucial Youth 0:49
32. "Food For Thought" - Christ on a Crutch 1:22
33. "NRA Jingle" - UK Subs 0:38

=== At War With Society II ===
Disc 1

1. "Fish People" - Christ on a Crutch 2:08
2. "State Of Alert" - UK Subs 0:50
3. "Loose Interpretation Of The Bomb" - Accustomed To Nothing 2:59
4. "No Guts" - LoudMouths 1:59
5. "Born Addicted" - No Use For A Name 2:39
6. "USA"- Reagan Youth 1:20
7. "All Laced Up" - Swingin' Utters 2:46
8. "Die For The Government" - Anti-Flag 3:40
9. "Thinking Of Suicide - Social Unrest 1:45
10. "Its All Over" - Squat 2:03
11. "The Bridge" - Samiam 3:20
12. "Be My Girl" - Snap Her 2:07
13. "Flossing With An E String"- Kraut 1:40
14. "Stop The Production" - Corrupted Ideals 1:25
15. "DMV" - No Use For A Name 3:08
16. "Messages" - Ultraman 2:35
17. "Corporate Life"- Hogan's Heroes 1:10
18. "I Dont Care" - Corrupted Ideals 2:17
19. "Tenderloin" - The Nukes 3:34
20. "Nobody Move" - UK Subs 1:33
21. "Home" - 2 Line Filler 3:18
22. "We Are The One" - Jack Killed Jill 2:19
23. "Sky Flying By" - Samiam 3:58
24. "Reggae Gets Big In A Small Town" - Swingin' Utters 1:33
25. "Its Your Right" - The Wretch 2:45
26. "Colossal Sleep" - Social Unrest 1:42
27. "Drained" - The Nukes 3:14
28. "Mineola" - Ten Bright Spikes 3:24
29. "Regrets" - Samiam 3:49
30. "Positive Dental Outlook" - Crucial Youth 0:49
31. "General Enemy" - Social Unrest 1:32
32. "NRA Jingle" - UK Subs 0:39

== Reception ==
- Big Takeover / All Music Guide's Jack Rabid said of At War With Society "You have now, As a gesture, a sneer against the music business, San Fran punkhardcore label NRA decided to celebrate their tenth year by putting out a compilation ...that spans that decade of service..... a few cuts apiece for most bands.......... Can't say they're not giving you value for your money! .......got early 80's New York thrash-era greats.....and many So-Cal institutions-- Some......hearken back to a time when "anyone could try it" meant exhilarating instead of so damn boring. Others.......show the benefit of extended rehearsal with their smashing cuts. It all adds up to a rounded and interesting revolt against robot society,........ indeed."
- Flipside Magazine's Rog said of At War With Society "Abrasively angry and amped with an overload of anarchy, this disc full of decadent civil disobedience possesses savage sounds of all-out war being waged against society…Molotov cocktail music that'll enflame your spirit with an undeniable urge to riot and revolt against the moralistic standards of this nations authoritative pomposity. Raw and repulsive punk raw that includes unruly urban upheaval and disorderly disruptiveness....This is the most chaotically charged CD of the century...."
- Maximum RockNRoll's Allan McNaughton said of At War With Society "...current Top 10 list"
