= The Audacity of Hype =

Studio album by Jello Biafra and the Guantanamo School of Medicine
- Released: October 20, 2009
- Genre: Hardcore punk
- Length: 57:49
- Label: Alternative Tentacles
- Producer: Mr. Biafra

Jello Biafra and the Guantanamo School of Medicine chronology
The Audacity of Hype (2009)	Enhanced Methods of Questioning EP (2011)

Professional ratings
Review scores
Source	Rating
Allmusic	3/5 stars
Alternative Press	2.5/5 stars
The Aquarian Weekly	(B+)
Punknews.org	3.5/5 stars

The Audacity of Hype is an album released on October 20, 2009 by Jello Biafra and the Guantanamo School of Medicine on Alternative Tentacles. The name is a parody of Barack Obama's book The Audacity of Hope.

== Song origins ==
Some of the songs have previously been played by Biafra with other collaborators:

- "Electronic Plantation", "Panic Land", and "Three Strikes" originated from an unreleased collaboration with Biafra and The Heads.
- "New Feudalism" and "Electronic Plantation" were released by The No WTO Combo on the live album Live from the Battle in Seattle.

== Track listing ==
All tracks are written by Mr. Biafra.

No.	Title	Length
1.	"The Terror of Tinytown"	4:36
2.	"Clean As A Thistle"	4:14
3.	"New Feudalism"	2:38
4.	"Panic Land"	4:21
5.	"Electronic Plantation"	5:45
6.	"Three Strikes"	6:05
7.	"Strength Thru Shopping"	3:54
8.	"Pets Eat Their Master"	5:03
9.	"I Won't Give Up" (the song "I Won't Give Up" ends at 7:11. After 6 minutes of silence, at minute 13:11, starts a hidden track featuring all of the songs played at the same time)	21:14

== Personnel ==
- Jello Biafra – Vocals
- Ralph Spight – Guitars
- Jon Weiss – Drums
- Billy Gould – Bass guitar
- Kimo Ball – Guitars

=== Additional personnel ===
- Ani Kyd – Back-up vocals on "Electronic Plantation" and "Pets Eat Their Masters"
- Pat Wynne – Back-up vocals
- Anne-Marie Anderson – Back up vocals
