= Enhanced Methods of Questioning =

EP by Jello Biafra and the Guantanamo School of Medicine
- Released: May 24, 2011
- Genre: Hardcore punk
- Label: Alternative Tentacles
- Producer: Marshall Lawless

Jello Biafra and the Guantanamo School of Medicine chronology
The Audacity of Hype (2009)	Enhanced Methods of Questioning (2011)	White People and the Damage Done (2013)

Professional ratings
Review scores
Source	Rating
Allmusic	4/5 stars
Alternative Press	1.5/5 stars
Punknews.org	4/5 stars

Enhanced Methods of Questioning is an EP released by Jello Biafra and the Guantanamo School of Medicine. It was released on May 24, 2011 on Alternative Tentacles. The name is a reference to enhanced interrogation techniques.

== Track listing ==
All tracks are written by Biafra.

No.	Title	Length
1.	"Dot Com Monte Carlo"	3:41
2.	"The Cells That Will Not Die"	4:40
3.	"Victory Stinks"	4:00
4.	"Invasion Of The Mind Snatchers"	5:02
5.	"Miracle Penis Highway" (Includes the hidden track "Metamorphosis Exploration On Deviation Street Jam")	32:03

== Personnel ==
- Jello Biafra - Vocals
- Ralph Spight - Guitars, vocals
- Jon Weiss - Drums, percussion
- Billy Gould - Bass guitar
- Kimo Ball - Guitars
