= Jello Biafra and the Guantanamo School of Medicine =

American punk rock band

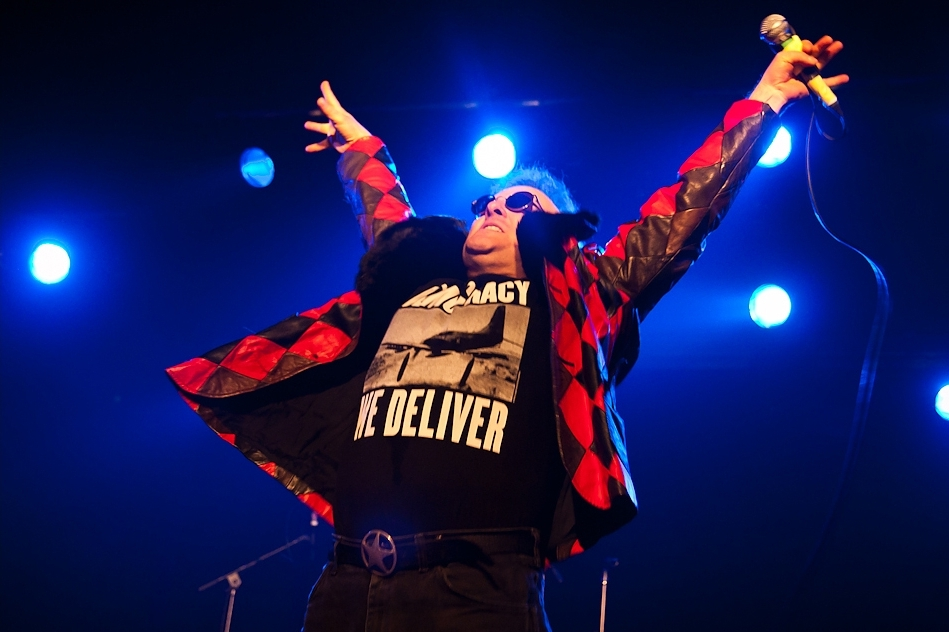
- Jello Biafra in performance, 2011

Background information
- Origin: San Francisco, California, United States
- Genres: Punk rock
- Years active: 2008–present
- Labels: Alternative Tentacles
- Members: Jello Biafra; Ralph Spight; Larry Boothroyd; Jason Willer
- Past members: Billy Gould; Jon Weiss; Paul Della Pelle; Andrew Weiss; Kimo Ball
- Website: MySpace page

Jello Biafra and the Guantanamo School of Medicine is a punk rock band led by Jello Biafra. They released their debut album, The Audacity of Hype in October 2009.

== Biography ==
Inspired by Iggy Pop's 60th birthday gig at the Warfield in San Francisco, Biafra laid plans for his own 50th birthday party and finally decided it was time to start a band of his own. Ten years before he had been attempting the same thing with the likes of guitarist Ralph Spight (Victims Family, Freak Accident, Hellworms) and drummer Jon Weiss (Sharkbait, Horsey). They had also previously worked with bassist Billy Gould (Faith No More) who was tapped for the new group. After cramming rehearsal for a month, the four-piece band known as Jello Biafra and the Axis Of Merry Evildoers took the stage in a sold-out two nightstand at San Francisco's Great American Music Hall and subsequently spent the next 9 months in rehearsal for an album project. Before entering the studio, guitarist Kimo Ball (Freak Accident, Carneyball Johnson, Mol Triffid, Griddle) was recruited and the resulting twin guitar attack took the groups sound to new, noisier heights. The quintet now known as Jello Biafra and The Guantanamo School of Medicine began recording tracks for the upcoming LP/CD "The Audacity Of Hype" slated for release in October 2009, produced by Biafra and engineered by Hip Hop legend and longtime Jello collaborator Matt Kelley (Hieroglyphics, Tupac Shakur, Digital Underground, Victims Family) at Prairie Sun Recording in Cotati, CA and San Francisco's Hyde Street Studios.

The band's sound retains some of the sound of the Dead Kennedys while adding a Detroit style proto-punk mixed with layers of sonic guitar noise, and Weiss' industrial excursions into metal percussion. Topically, the album explores what Biafra describes as the nation's "forced Iraqnophobia and Homeland Insecurity" and how it continues to feed lawlessness by political leaders such as in the song "The Terror of Tiny Town." Other songs criticize a perceived police state and class war towards the bottom, for example in the songs "Three Strikes" and "Electronic Plantation." "Clean As A Thistle" evokes family values blowhards caught in sinful trysts, while album closer "I Won't Give Up" offers an age of Obama anthem on how change comes from agitation from below, not glamour and soundbites from the top.

In 2010, Jon's brother, Andrew Weiss (Rollins Band, Ween, Butthole Surfers), temporarily filled the bass position for live performances while Billy Gould took part in the Faith No More reunion tour.

The band's second release, an EP titled Enhanced Methods of Questioning, was released on May 31, 2011. Controversy for the band arose after news was released of the band's decision to play in Tel Aviv, Israel on 2 July 2011. Biafra received much criticism from the left and punk community in light of an artistic boycott of Israel put forward by the Boycott, Divestment and Sanctions campaign in 2005. On 29 June 2011, Jello Biafra and the Guantanamo School of Medicine announced that their controversial show in Tel Aviv, Israel, was cancelled.

In 2012, the band, now officially including Andrew Weiss on bass and Paul Della Pelle on drums, entered the studio. The first song released from the session was "SHOCK-U-PY!", a tribute to the Occupy movement, which was released in July 2012 on Bandcamp. That song was featured on a single in the fall of 2012 and later on the band's next album, White People and the Damage Done.

== Members ==
=== Current ===
- Jello Biafra – vocals (2008–present)
- Ralph Spight – guitar (2008–present)
- Larry Boothroyd – bass (2013–present)
- Jason Willer – drums (2016–present)

=== Former ===
- Billy Gould – bass (2008–2011)
- Jon Weiss – drums (2008–2012)
- Paul Della Pelle – drums (2012–2016)
- Andrew Weiss – bass (2011–2014)
- Kimo Ball – guitar (2008–2018)

== Discography ==
=== Albums ===
- The Audacity of Hype (2009)
- White People and the Damage Done (2013)
- Tea Party Revenge Porn (2020)

=== EPs/singles ===
- Enhanced Methods of Questioning (2011)
- SHOCK-U-PY! (2012)
