= Jason Willer =

American musician (born 1978)

- Born: Jason Matthew Willer; September 19, 1978 (age 47); Vallejo, California
- Genres: Punk; Prog Rock
- Occupations: Drummer; singer; songwriter
- Labels: Lookout Records; S.P.A.M Records; New Disorder Records; Adeline Records; Time and Matter Records; Captain Oi! Records; Combat Rock Records; Ruination Records; Level Plane Records; Alternative Tentacles; Neurot Recordings; Prank Records; Cleopatra Records; Pirates Press Records
- Formerly of: The Enemies; Hedersleben; Drain the Sky; Jello Biafra & GSM; Nik Turner; U.K. Subs; Cross Stitched Eyes; ALARIC; Brainticket; Born Uglys; CHARGER

Jason Matthew Willer (born 1978) is an American drummer, singer and songwriter. Willer has been active in numerous bands, including the U.K. Subs and many others. He is primarily associated with the East Bay punk rock and metal scene from the 1990s till the present and has toured extensively throughout the world.

== Early life ==
Jason Matthew Willer was born to Jeffrey and Melanie Willer on September 19, 1978, at Kaiser Permanente Medical Center in Vallejo, California. His father, Jeffrey R. Willer was a computer programmer who ended his career at Lawrence Berkeley National Laboratory. His mother, Melanie Hansen Willer stayed at home to raise their three children; Jason, Jeremy and April until the couple were divorced in 1983. Willer attended Mt. Diablo Elementary, Highland Elementary, Pine Hollow Middle School and Clayton Valley High School, where he was briefly a member of the marching band, under the instruction of Scott Johnson.

Willer grew up in Clayton, California and was raised in a devoutly Mormon household. His father played guitar and sang for a wedding band who rehearsed in the Willer living room and left the instruments set up afterwards, giving the future drummer his first opportunity to sit at and play on a drum set. Interest in music started early, inspired by a radio station KVHS, that was and continues to be broadcast from Clayton Valley High School. The station would broadcast a specialty show from 10 pm to Midnight playing Thrash and Death Metal that piqued Willer's imagination, revealing worlds of music to explore. At age 13 Willer received drum instructions at Countrywood Music from Larry Schultz. and obtained his first drum kit, a Blue Spakle CB700, from a neighbor who had heard him banging on pots. After receiving his patriarchal blessing at age 14, Willer stopped attending Mormon services and became a regular at 924 Gilman Street, where he said, 'Music became my new religion'. The first show attended by Willer at the Gilman featured Naked Aggression in 1993.

At age fifteen Willer joined a punk band called Teenagers From Mars and started playing shows around the Bay Area on weekends as well as school nights. The band would also tour the West Coast, appearing in Los Angeles.

== Career ==
=== Enemies ===
Willer joined the group the Enemies at the age of 18, with Mike Pelino, the band's singer, guitarist, and main songwriter and whose sister had given the band its name. Playing bass for the Enemies was Rick Jacobus, who had been a childhood friend of Pelino and would later team up with Willer again in his band Alaric. Like many punk rockbands in the Bay Area, Enemies got their start at the Gilman. The band would release their first recordings in 1998 on an album released by S.P.A.M. Records titled Conquered / Concord which was a compilation with another Bay Area band, Second Hand Spit, in which Enemies were represented by two songs, This Mess and Feed Your Greed.Lookout! Records would release their album Seize the Day in 2002 with Dave Edwardson of Neurosis on bass. Critical acclaim for the album resulted in an eighteen months tour which included high profile events for Thrasher magazine and Real Skateboards. The band would remain active until 2004 when they played their final show at Bottom of the Hill in San Francisco. Pelino would go on to play guitar and sing backup vocals for Green Day.

=== U.K. Subs ===
In 2001, Willer heard that the U.K. Subs, a British punk rock band that had been active since 1977 needed a drummer for a Brazil/Argentina tour. At the time, being concerned about heroin use among his housemates and other associates, he decided getting out of the Bay Area would be a smart move and within weeks was in South America, touring and recording and would continue to be a drummer for the band until 2006, touring Europe, Canada and Japan.

=== Cross Stitched Eyes ===
While still drumming for the U.K. Subs, Willer moved to Germany in 2004 and started the band Cross Stitched Eyes which are on the Alternative Tentacles label as well as Ruin Nation Records. Cross Stitched Eyes would release 6 albums between 2006 and 2013 which were largely classified in the Anarcho-punk genre as well as Crust punk. Willer carried the vocals for Cross Stitched Eyes in a style described as abrasive off-kilter punk in the tradition of Peni's Death Church LP and the first, self-titled Killing Joke LP.

=== Alaric ===
After returning to the US, Willer reached out to Shane Baker with the idea of forming a dark band inspired by the heavy metal he had grown up on with some British anarcho influences. The band Alaric was formed in 2008 with former bandmate Rick Jacobus on bass and Baker as the lead vocalist, singing songs that convey emotions like loss and regret. The band released their self-titled Alaric in 2011 with 20 Buck Spin records. The band's final release came after the band parted ways and then re-united to release End of Mirrors in 2016 with Neurot Recordings.

=== Drain The Sky ===
The name Drain The Sky comes from William Faulkner's The Hamlet, and the band featured bassist Carl Auge, formerly of His Hero Is Gone and George Wunderlich. The band would release one album with Willer, Haunted By Rivers, on Level Plane Records in 2008.

=== The Born Uglys ===
Formed by guitarist Greg Valencia of the New Mexico hardcore scene of the 1990s, The Born Uglys would release one album with Willer, Pictures of Ugly Babies Sell Records in 2009 on Prank Records.

=== Nik Turner ===
In 2012 Willer teamed up with Nicky Garrett from U.K. Subs again to back up Nik Turner from the UK space rock/prog band Hawkwind. After the 2013 release of Turner's Space Gypsy album, Willer would accompany the band on a 30-city tour of the US called Space Ritual, between October and November of that year. Willer would play drums for Turner on four studio albums, the latest of which, The Final Frontier was released in 2019.

=== Hedersleben and Brainticket ===
The concept for the band Hedersleben began in 2011 with Nicky Garrett and Uve Müllrich, bass player of the Krautrock band Embryo, in Hedersleben, Germany. In 2012 when Garrett became the music director for Nik Turner the opportunity to reunite with Willer presented itself, during the recording of Turner's Space Gypsy. In August 2013, Willer joined keyboard/flute/sitar player Joel Vandroogenbroeck, founder of the Krautrock band Brainticket, to collaborate, and record Past, Present, and Future, the first Brainticket studio album in 15 years. Hedersleben recorded their debut album, Upgoer back to back with Braintickets's Past, Present & Future. Willer accompanied Hedersleben opening for Nik Turner on tour in 2013, 2014, and 2015.

=== Jello Biafra and the Guantanamo School of Medicine ===
Jello Biafra and the Guantanamo School of Medicine, was founded in 2009 by the former song writer and singer for The Dead Kennedys. Willer would join the group in 2016, replacing drummer Paul Della Pelle. In the first LP release since 2014 by Biafra, Willer plays on Tea Party Revenge Porn, to be released by Alternative Tentacles in January 2021.

=== Charger ===
In 2017, after Willer began teaching Matt Freeman's (Rancid and formerly Operation Ivy) son to play drums, Freeman and Willer decided to experiment together playing metal influenced rock. After establishing some rhythm parts that they both enjoyed, they brought in Drew McGee, former guitar player for God Lives Underwater. The result would be called Charger and their first self-titled album would be released by Pirates Press Records in 2019, followed by a tour with The Old Firm Casuals. Charger went on to release two singles Watch Your Back and Stay Down in 2020.

== Discography ==
=== Alaric ===
- Alaric (2009)
- Alaric / Atriarch (2012)
- End of Mirrors (2016)

=== The Born Uglys ===
- Pictures Of Ugly Babies Sell Records (2009)

=== Brain Ticket ===
- Past, Present & Future (2015)

=== CHARGER ===
- Charger (2019) drums, vocals and backing vocals

=== Cross Stitched Eyes ===
- I (2007)
- II (2008) vocals
- III (2008) vocals
- Coranach (2009) drums and vocals
- Decomposition (2012) drums and vocals
- Live in Radom (2013) vocals

=== Drain the Sky ===
- Haunted by Rivers (2008) drums and vocals

=== Enemies ===
- Conquered / Concord (1998)
- Enemies / Pitch Black (2001)
- Seize The Day (2002)

=== Hedersleben ===
- The Fall of Chronopolis (2015)
- Upgoer (2016)

=== Jello Biafra and GSM ===
- Tea Party Revenge Porn (Single 2020)

=== U.K. Subs ===
- Universal, (2002)
- Violent State (2005)
- A.W.O.L. (2005)
- Product Supply (2011)

=== Nik Turner ===
- Space Gypsy (2013)
- Space Fusion Odyssey (2015)
- Life in Space (2017)
- The Final Frontier (2019)

== Equipment ==
Since 2016, Willer has been a Brooks Drums artist. For the band Charger, Willer uses an eight-piece kit consisting of two 22-inch bass drums, 10", 12", 13" 16" and 18" toms and a 7X14 cast aluminum snare drum. In 2017 Willer became a Paiste cymbals artist and for the band Charger his set consists of 14" Sound Edge hi hats, 17" Full Signature crash, 18" Reflector Heavy crash, 19" Giant Beat, 22" Rude Reign Power Ride, 20" Rude Novo China and 18" Rude China. All of Willer's hardware is Tama.

== Teaching ==
Willer has taught drums since 2004. His teaching method is methodical, starting with stick control/basics, reading drum music and practicing often, using the metronome. For teaching, Willer has three vintage Ludwig kits, which are set aside exclusively for use by his students.
