= Skaters Gear – 6 =

Skaters Gear 6

Compilation album by Various Artists
- Released: 1995
- Genre: Hardcore punk
- Label: J!mco Records
- Producer: Various

Skaters Gear 6 is a compilation album mostly of hardcore punk artists from USA and UK. It was originally released in 1995 in Japan as a 28-song CD. The album was compiled by Flavour Records. The American version Hardcore Breakout USA Volume 2 was compiled and released in 1995.

== Track listing ==
=== Skaters Gear 6 ===
Disc 1 Part 1

1. "On A String" - Dogs On Ice 2:51
2. "People Suck" - No Use For A Name 2:08
3. "Hi Jinx" - Fizgig 1:13
4. "Backsight" - Caffeine 2:36
5. "Im Nobody" - Shleprock 3:42
6. "Fill It Up" - Hogan's Heroes 2:14
7. "Get Along" - Passed 3:12
8. "With A Capitol P" - Rail 2:45
9. "Darth Vader" - Fizgig 3:26
10. "No Race" - Corrupted Ideals 2:20
11. "Flicknife Temper" - Sanity Assassins 3:04
12. "Cant Break My Pride" - 2 Line Filler 2:25
13. "Cold" - Hogan's Heroes 1:55
14. "Messages" - Ultraman 2:34
15. "Over The Edge" - Corrupted Ideals 1:54
16. "La Mancha Candidate" - Ten Bright Spikes 2:45
17. "Sky Flying By" - Samiam 3:54
18. "Born Addicted" - No Use For A Name 2:36
19. "Mineola" - Ten Bright Spikes 3:22
20. "Its Your Right" - The Wretch 2:44
21. "Fish People" - Christ on a Crutch 2:06
22. "I Dont Care" - Corrupted Ideals 2:17
23. "Self Destruct" - UK Subs 2:24
24. "Acid Rain" - Reagan Youth 1:54
25. "DMV" - No Use For A Name 3:08
26. "Slow Stupid & Hungry" - MDC 1:09
27. "Go Away" - Samiam 3:47
28. "000,000" - Ten Bright Spikes 3:42
