= Hardcore Breakout USA Volume 2 =

Hardcore Breakout USA – Volume 2

Compilation album by Various Artists
- Released: 1995
- Genres: Hardcore punk, metalcore punk rock
- Length: 68:47
- Label: New Red Archives
- Producer: Various

Hardcore Breakout USA – Volume 2 is an internationally distributed compilation album mostly of artists that are on New Red Archives records. It was originally released in 1995 as a CD. The album was compiled by New Red Archives. It is part two to the 1990 release Hardcore Breakout USA. The Japanese version Skaters Gear - 6 was compiled and released in 1995.

== Track listing ==
=== Hardcore Breakout USA ===
Volume 2 Part 1

1. "On A String" – Dogs On Ice 2:51
2. "People Suck" – No Use For A Name 2:08
3. "Hi Jinx" – Fizgig 1:13
4. "Backsight" – Caffeine 2:36
5. "Im Nobody" – Shleprock 3:42
6. "Fill It Up" – Hogan's Heroes 2:14
7. "Get Along" – Passed 3:12
8. "With A Capitol P" – Rail 2:45
9. "Darth Vader" – Fizgig 3:26
10. "No Race" – Corrupted Ideals 2:20
11. "Flicknife Temper" – Sanity Assassins 3:04
12. "Cant Break My Pride" – 2 Line Filler 2:25
13. "Cold" – Hogan's Heroes 1:55

Part 2

1. "Messages" – Ultraman 2:34
2. "Over The Edge" – Corrupted Ideals 1:54
3. "La Mancha Candidate" – Ten Bright Spikes 2:45
4. "Sky Flying By" – Samiam 3:54
5. "Born Addicted" – No Use For A Name 2:36
6. "Mineola" – Ten Bright Spikes 3:22
7. "Its Your Right" – The Wretch 2:44
8. "Fish People" – Christ on a Crutch 2:06
9. "I Dont Care" – Corrupted Ideals 2:17
10. "Self Destruct" – UK Subs 2:24
11. "Acid Rain" – Reagan Youth 1:54
12. "DMV" – No Use For A Name 3:08
13. "Slow Stupid & Hungry" – MDC 1:09
14. "Go Away" – Samiam 3:47
15. "000,000" – Ten Bright Spikes 3:42
