= Hardcore Breakout USA 1,2,3,... =

Hardcore Breakout USA - Volume 1,2,3,...

Compilation album by Various Artists
- Released: 2004
- Genre: Hardcore punk
- Labels: New Red Archives; Cleopatra Records
- Producer: Various

Hardcore Breakout USA Volume 1,2,3,... is an internationally distributed compilation album that collects Volumes 1,2 and 3 of Hardcore Breakout USA series. It features American and UK artists mostly that are on New Red Archives records. Volume 1 was originally released in 1990 as a double LP and cassette then on CD. The New Red Archives pressing of the album was issued as a single LP in 1990. The Japanese version of Volume 1 was compiled and released in 1994. The second version Hardcore Breakout USA Volume 2 was compiled and released in 1995. Volume 2 is a compilation album of American and UK artists mostly that are on New Red Archives records. It was originally released in 1995 as a CD. The album was compiled by New Red Archives. The Japanese version of Volume 2 was compiled and released in 1995. Volume 3 was compiled in 2003. Volume 3 is a compilation album of American and UK artists mostly that are on New Red Archives records. Hardcore Breakout 1,2,3... was re-released by Cleopatra Records in 2013.

== Track listing ==
=== Volume 1 ===
Part 1

1. "Jolt" - Ultraman 1:58
2. "Rich" - Jawbreaker 2:58
3. "Indigestion" - Samiam 2:41
4. "Stand Up And Fight" - Bedlam Hour 1:50
5. "Shave Clean" - Crucial Youth 0:53
6. "Full On" - Hogan's Heroes 1:24
7. "New Queen" - Samiam 2:23
8. "Those Who Curse" - Crucial Youth 1:19
9. "Zombies" - Kraut 1:55
10. "You Popped My Life" - G Whizz 2:37
11. "Threat Of Power" - Squat 2:06
12. "Its About Time" - Agitators 1:40

Part 2

1. "Turn To Ice" - Ultraman 2:14
2. "Home Sweet Home" - Samiam 1:53
3. "Unemployed" - Kraut 2:17
4. "Positive Dental Outlook" - Crucial Youth 0:51
5. "Megalopolis" - UK Subs 1:55
6. "Breaking Your Rules" - Hogan's Heroes 3:59
7. "Underground" - Samiam 3:40
8. "Sabre Dance" - UK Subs 3:13
9. "Reagan Youth" - Reagan Youth 1:19
10. "Last Will" - Hogan's Heroes 1:49
11. "Juvenile Justice" - Kraut 2:17
12. "Frog Song" - P.E.D. 0:49

=== Volume 2 ===
Part 1

1. "On A String" - Dogs On Ice 2:51
2. "People Suck" - No Use For A Name 2:08
3. "Hi Jinx" - Fizgig 1:13
4. "Backsight" - Caffeine 2:36
5. "Im Nobody" - Shleprock 3:42
6. "Fill It Up" - Hogan's Heroes 2:14
7. "Get Along" - Passed 3:12
8. "With A Capitol P" - Rail 2:45
9. "Darth Vader" - Fizgig 3:26
10. "No Race" - Corrupted Ideals 2:20
11. "Flicknife Temper" - Sanity Assassins 3:04
12. "Cant Break My Pride" - 2 Line Filler 2:25
13. "Cold" - Hogan's Heroes 1:55

Part 2

1. "Messages" - Ultraman 2:34
2. "Over The Edge" - Corrupted Ideals 1:54
3. "La Mancha Candidate" - Ten Bright Spikes 2:45
4. "Sky Flying By" - Samiam 3:54
5. "Born Addicted" - No Use For A Name 2:36
6. "Mineola" - Ten Bright Spikes 3:22
7. "Its Your Right" - The Wretch 2:44
8. "Fish People" - Christ on a Crutch 2:06
9. "I Dont Care" - Corrupted Ideals 2:17
10. "Self Destruct" - UK Subs 2:24
11. "Acid Rain" - Reagan Youth 1:54
12. "DMV" - No Use For A Name 3:08
13. "Slow Stupid & Hungry" - MDC 1:09
14. "Go Away" - Samiam 3:47
15. "000,000" - Ten Bright Spikes 3:42

=== Volume 3 ===
Part 1

1. "Fair Warning" - Badtown Boys 1:08
2. "Subvert" - Hunchback 2:01
3. "Teenage Soap Opera" - Knuckleheads 3:16
4. "Superfast Punk" - Accustomed To Nothing 2:37
5. "Ghost" - Ultraman 2:33
6. "Cobra Crunch" - Loudmouths 1:54
7. "I Need A Life" - The Damned 2:23
8. "USA PD" - Snap Her 2:59
9. "Crucifixion" - Pezz 1;37
10. "Rock The Boat" - Anti Flag 2:34
11. "Openly" - 2 Line Filler 4:25
12. "Left Behind" - The Puritans 2:27
13. "Hemorrhage" - Cream Abul Babar 2:37
14. "Should've Known" - Jack Killed Jill 2:34
15. "Clown Part" - JFA/Jello Biafra 3:03

Part 2

1. "40 Ounces" - Dead Lazlos Place 3:11
2. "Fuck You Wheres My Brew" - Dehumanized 2:31
3. "Scarred For Life" - Crucial Youth 2:13
4. "Sex Change" - Snap Her 1:45
5. "War On The Pentagon" - UK Subs 4:06
6. "Teenage Genocide" - Swingin Utters 1:39
7. "Real Thing" - Squat 2:08
8. "I Am The Nation" - Social Unrest 2:33
