= Blatant Localism =

EP by JFA
- Released: 1981
- Recorded: 1981
- Genres: Punk rock, skate punk, hardcore punk
- Length: 7:09
- Label: Placebo
- Producers: JFA and Greg Hymes

Blatant Localism is the first EP released by the Arizona-based skate punk band JFA, in 1981. It was the first major underground release in the punk rock scene to incorporate skate themes, making JFA one of the pioneering skate punk bands.

== Track listing ==
1. "Out of School" (1:32)
2. "JFA" (1:17)
3. "Do the Hannigan" (0:22)
4. "Count" (0:07)
5. "Beach Blanket Bongout" (3:02)
6. "Cokes and Snickers" (0:49)
