= White People and the Damage Done =

Studio album by Jello Biafra and the Guantanamo School of Medicine
- Released: April 2, 2013
- Recorded: 2012
- Genre: Hardcore punk; surf punk
- Length: 77:12
- Label: Alternative Tentacles
- Producer: Marshall Lawless and Matt Kelley

Jello Biafra and the Guantanamo School of Medicine chronology
Enhanced Methods of Questioning EP (2011)	White People and the Damage Done (2013)	Tea Party Revenge Porn (2020)

Professional ratings
Review scores
Source	Rating
Allmusic	4.0/5 stars
Consequence of Sound	3.5/5 stars

White People and the Damage Done is the second album by Jello Biafra and the Guantanamo School of Medicine. It was released on April 2, 2013 on Alternative Tentacles.

== Track listing ==
All tracks are written by Jello Biafra.

No.	Title	Length
1.	"The Brown Lipstick Parade"	5:12
2.	"John Dillinger"	3:55
3.	"Werewolves of Wall Street"	3:27
4.	"Road Rage"	2:37
5.	"Mid-East Peace Process"	3:01
6.	"Hollywood Goof Disease"	3:34
7.	"White People and the Damage Done"	5:09
8.	"Crapture"	4:41
9.	"Burgers of Wrath"	5:33
10.	"Shock-U-Py!"	14:34
11.	"The Brown Lipstick Parade (Spit-Valve Brass Mix)"	5:14
12.	"Burgers Of Wrath (Slight Rural Extension)"	5:51
13.	"Crapture (Flight F.I.N.A.L. Space Blast Extension)"	6:51
14.	"Shock-U-Py! (Soul Clap Mix)"	7:33

== Personnel ==
- Jello Biafra – vocals
- Ralph Spight – guitar
- Kimo Ball – guitar
- Andrew Weiss – bass
- Paul Della Pelle – drums
