= Nude Bowl =

Skateboarding area in California, US

Coordinates: 33.967504°N 116.620163°W

The Nude Bowl was a popular skateboarding locale from the late 1970s to the early 1990s. The name comes from the fact that the site was once a naturist resort named "Desert Gardens Ranch."

It is outside Desert Hot Springs, California and consists of an abandoned kidney bean shaped swimming pool and a few foundations of buildings that used to surround the area. There is no paved road to the Nude Bowl.

Initially, the Nude Bowl was merely a skateboarding party location, but by the 1990s, large parties and violence became commonplace there. After numerous complaints about guns and fighting around the Nude Bowl, the police filled it in with dirt. Skateboarders returned, removed the dirt, and repaired the bowl. After a few months, the police broke up the concrete and buried the remains of the bowl, but the pool was later excavated and repaired.

== Documentary and resurrection ==
A documentary project on the site was started in 2008, intending to trace the Nude Bowl's history, from Nudist Colony to the many attempts at re-building.

The Palm Springs Skatepark contains a replica of the Nude Bowl, which is the most popular feature in the park.

The history of the Nude Bowl is the subject of JFA's popular song "Nude Bowl Resurrection".
