= JFA (band) =

American hardcore punk band

- Origin: Phoenix, Arizona; Southern California, U.S.
- Genres: Skate punk, hardcore punk
- Years active: 1981–present
- Labels: Placebo, DC-Jam Records
- Members: Brian Brannon; Don Redondo; Corey Stretz; Jamie Reidling
- Past members: Michael Cornelius; Mike "Bam-Bam" Sversvold (deceased); Jorge Bermudez; Alan Bishop; Carter Blitch; Scott Chazan; Bob Cox (deceased); Brian Damage; Joel DuBois; Trace Element; Matt Etheridge; Jim Moore; Al Penzone; Bruce Taylor; Mike Tracy; Todd Barnes (deceased)
- Website: azpx.com/jfa/

JFA (Jodie Foster's Army) is an American hardcore punk band formed in 1981, with roots in Arizona and in Southern California skateboard culture. The original members include Brian Brannon (vocals), Don Redondo (guitar), Michael Cornelius (bass), and Mike "Bam-Bam" Sversvold (drums). Alan Bishop of Sun City Girls also played bass for a time. The band was pivotal in the development of the skate punk and Skate Rock scenes. Over the years, the lineup has included many bass players and drummers but the core of Brannon and Redondo has remained constant.

== History ==
=== Establishment ===
JFA was formed in April 1981, 19 days after the failed attempted assassination of Ronald Reagan by John Hinckley Jr. Hinckley, an obsessed fan of Jodie Foster and her portrayal of a teen prostitute in the 1976 Martin Scorsese film Taxi Driver, reportedly attempted to kill the President as a means of impressing the actress. The band's name was thus a dark play on Hinckley's attempt at murdering Reagan.

Don Redondo, then in the band The Deez, and Cornelius, then in the band Jr. Chemists, knew each other from shows around Phoenix, Arizona and from skateboarding. They began playing together after a D.O.A. concert during the band's Hardcore 81 tour. Bam-Bam later joined after meeting Redondo at an "Industrial Dance" in Phoenix. Brian Brannon was pulled into the band by Cornelius who met him skateboarding and at punk shows.

The band's first show was opening for Black Flag at an Industrial Dance which was one of a series of early Phoenix punk shows. Their first song of the night was "Pipetruck", which combined elements of "Police Truck" by The Dead Kennedys and "Pipeline" by The Chantays.

As of 1984 all members of the band were from Arizona, except Redondo (Huntington Beach, CA) and Cornelius (Bethesda, MD).

=== Recording history ===
Placebo Records released their debut EP Blatant Localism in late 1981. The band toured the west extensively and played many local shows. Their first national tour was in the summer of 1983 following the release of their first album Valley of the Yakes.

JFA recorded a cover of "Schroeder's Theme", which has been cited as one of the "best recordings of surf music by any punk band".

The original bassist, Michael Cornelius, left the band in the summer of 1984 prior to the nine-week summer '84 tour. Alan Bishop of labelmates Sun City Girls played bass until Cornelius returned for the 1986 release Nowhere Blossoms.

=== Skateboarding ===
The band received continuing coverage in the influential skateboard magazine Thrasher during the 1980s. Brannon appeared on the April 1987 cover of Thrasher riding backside at the Love Bowl in Phoenix, Arizona. He also appeared on the cover of the April 1989 issue grinding a fakie layback thruster on the edge of the pipe at Thrasherland Skatepark in Glendale, Arizona. In 1990, Brannon took a full-time position as staff writer at Thrasher and eventually became music editor and art director of the magazine until he left in 1997. Throughout the 1980s, Brannon, Redondo and Cornelius were Thrasher freelance contributors of articles and photographs.

Brian Brannon is a Master Chief in the United States Navy Reserve.

== Current lineup ==
- Brian Brannon – vocals, piano, organ
- Don "Redondo" Redondo – guitar
- Corey Stretz – bass
- Jamie Reidling – drums

== Discography ==
- Blatant Localism 7", Placebo (1981)
- Valley of the Yakes LP, Placebo (1983)
- Untitled LP, Placebo (1984)
- Mad Gardens 12", Placebo (1984)
- Live 1984 Tour LP, Placebo (1985)
- My Movie 7", Placebo (1986)
- Nowhere Blossoms LP, Placebo (1988)
- Lightnin' Storm/People's Revolutionary Party 7", Buzzkill (1991)
- Camp Out/Travels With Charlie 7", Spontaneous Combustion (1995)
- Secret Agent Man Split 7" with Jack Killed Jill, NRA (1996)
- Only Live Once CD, Hurricane (1999)
- We Know You Suck CD, Alternative Tentacles (2003)
- Live in Chicago 7" with the Faction, Spontaneous Combustion (2003)
- To All Our Friends LP, DC-Jam (2009)
- Speed of Sound CD, DC-Jam (2012)
- Last Ride LP, DC-Jam (2023)

=== UK releases ===
- Untitled 12", Fundamental UK
- Valley of the Yakes 12", Fundamental UK

=== Music videos ===
- Live at CBGB's (1984)
- Pipetruck (1984)
- Wilson (2010)
- Danny Sargent's Trucks (2010)
- Skateboard Anarchy (2014)

=== Compilations ===
- 16 Hi-Fi Hits, vinyl, DC-Jam
- All the Rage, Volume 2, GMD
- All the Rage 2000, GMD
- Amuck, Placebo
- Anarchy on Abbey Road - The Filth, The Fury and the Fab Four, Cleopatra
- Best of Flipside, Flipside
- Best of Rodney on the ROQ, Poshboy
- Best of Smoke 7, Bomp
- Bite the Bullet, Know
- Blazing Wheels & Barking Trucks, Skate Rock No. 2, High Speed
- Born to Skate, Skate Rock No. 4, High Speed
- Buried Alive, Smoke 7
- Concrete Waves, Disaster Records*
- Dean Lane Hardcore Funday 2022, DLH Records
- Deaner Skate Rock, DLH Records
- Deaner Skate Rock, Vol. 2, DLH Records
- Deaner Skate Rock, Vol. 3, DLH Records
- Eastern Front, Enigma/Eastern Front
- Explicit Skate Rock, Skate Rock No. 10, High Speed
- Flipside Vinyl Fanzine, Flipside
- For the Kids, Together
- High Rollers, AZPX
- Meathouse, cassette-only, Version Sound
- More Coffee for the Politicians, Placebo
- Old Skars & Upstarts, Disaster
- Phenis, Phenis Fanzine
- Pogo Strut Slam Swivel & Mosh, Devil Doll
- Punk Floyd, Cleopatra
- Punk Me Up, Cleopatra
- Rat Music for Rat People, Vol. 2 (CD Presents, 1984)
- Rodney on the ROQ, Volume 2, Poshboy
- Scene Killer, Outsider
- Sudden Death, Smoke 7
- This is Phoenix, Not the Circle Jerks, Placebo
- Thrasher Magazine Skate Rock No. 1, High Speed
- VMLive, Series 2/Volume 2, VML
- We Got Power, Mystic
- Workers Comp, Recess
- Hardcore Breakout USA 1,2,3,..., (New Red Archives 2004)

=== Soundtracks ===
- Damage, Think Skateboards Video (Phil Shao and Tim McKenney parts)
- Griptape and Gasoline, Duke Video
- High Rollers, AZPX
- Hitting the Streets, Thrasher Magazine Video
- Label Live!, Black Label Skateboards Video
- Mt. Baldy Pipe segment, Bluetorch TV
- Nude Bowl segment, Bluetorch TV
- Pow Wow at Powell II, NSA Skate Video
- Risk It, Santa Cruz Skate Video
- Skatopia, Speed-Line Productions
- Speed Freaks, Santa Cruz Speed Wheels Video
- Strange Notes - Son! Get Down From There!, Santa Cruz Skateboards
- Wheels of Fire, Santa Cruz Speed Wheels Video

=== Video games ===
- Tony Hawk's Pro Skater 4
- Tony Hawk's Pro Skater 3 + 4

=== Skateboards ===
- Brian Brannon Signature Model by AZPX Skateboards
- JFA Boards by Factory 13
- JFA Skateboards by Placebo Products (1980s)

== See also ==
- Ronald Reagan in music
