= !Action Pact! =

English punk rock band

- Also known as: The Bad Samaritans
- Origin: Stanwell, London, England
- Genre: Punk rock
- Years active: 1981–1986
- Labels: Subversive, Fall Out, Captain Oi!
- Past members: George Cheex; Wild Planet (Des Stanley); Dr. Phibes (Kim Igoe); Joe Fungus; Grimly Fiendish (Chris Lee); Elvin Pelvin (Phil Langham); Thistles

!Action Pact! was a London-based punk rock band, formed in 1981 by guitarist Wild Planet, bassist Kim Igoe, George Cheex, and drummer Joe Fungus. They would later break up in 1986.

== History ==
!Action Pact! was from Stanwell in Middlesex, and was also originally named Bad Samaritans. In 1981 they changed their name to !Action Pact!. The John from Dead Mans Shadow (D.M.S.) was Bad Samaritan's original lead singer, and he left to concentrate on D.M.S., before the name change. He was replaced by George Cheex, who got the job because of "her courage to scream along with the band's songs." They contributed two songs to the EP Heathrow Touchdown which was released in October, 1981, while George and Joe were still only 15 years old. "London Bouncers" and "All Purpose Action Footwear", got the attention of BBC Radio 1 DJ John Peel. He played their songs often and he convinced the band to record their first full session, which they did on 22 February 1982. They recorded "People", "Suicide Bag", "Mindless Aggression", "Losers", and "Cowslick Blues". The resulting demo tape caught the attention of the fledgling label Fall Out Records, which signed the band as the first act on its roster. !Action Pact!'s label debut, the Suicide Bag EP, was released in July 1982 and rocketed to the top of the British punk chart.

The band would later be joined by drummer Grimly Fiendish and bassist Thistles, and producer Phil Langham would also moonlight on bass under the name Elvin Pelvin; whereas Kim Igoe, the bassist, continued on as a lyricist. The band split in 1986.

In early 2016, Wild Planet (Des Stanley) died from cancer.

== Other projects ==
Wild Planet managed the heavy rock band Purge, in which his son, Mark Stanley, plays bass guitar; Purge has sometimes played a live cover version of !Action Pact!'s "London Bouncers". Joe Fungus also played with the punk band called Savage Upsurge.

== Discography ==
Chart positions shown are from the UK Indie Chart.

=== Albums ===
List of albums with chart positions
Title	Album details	UK Indie album chart
Mercury Theatre - On the Air!	Released 1983; Fall Out Records	5
Survival of the Fattest	Released 1984; Fall Out Records	-

=== Singles/EPs ===
List of singles/EP's with chart positions
Title	UK Indie singles chart
Heathrow Touchdown EP	-
Suicide Bag EP	6
"People"	13
London Bouncers EP	23
"Question of Choice"	36
Yet Another Dole Queue Song EP	7
"Cocktail Credibility"	33
