= Charlie Harper (singer) =

British singer (born 1944)

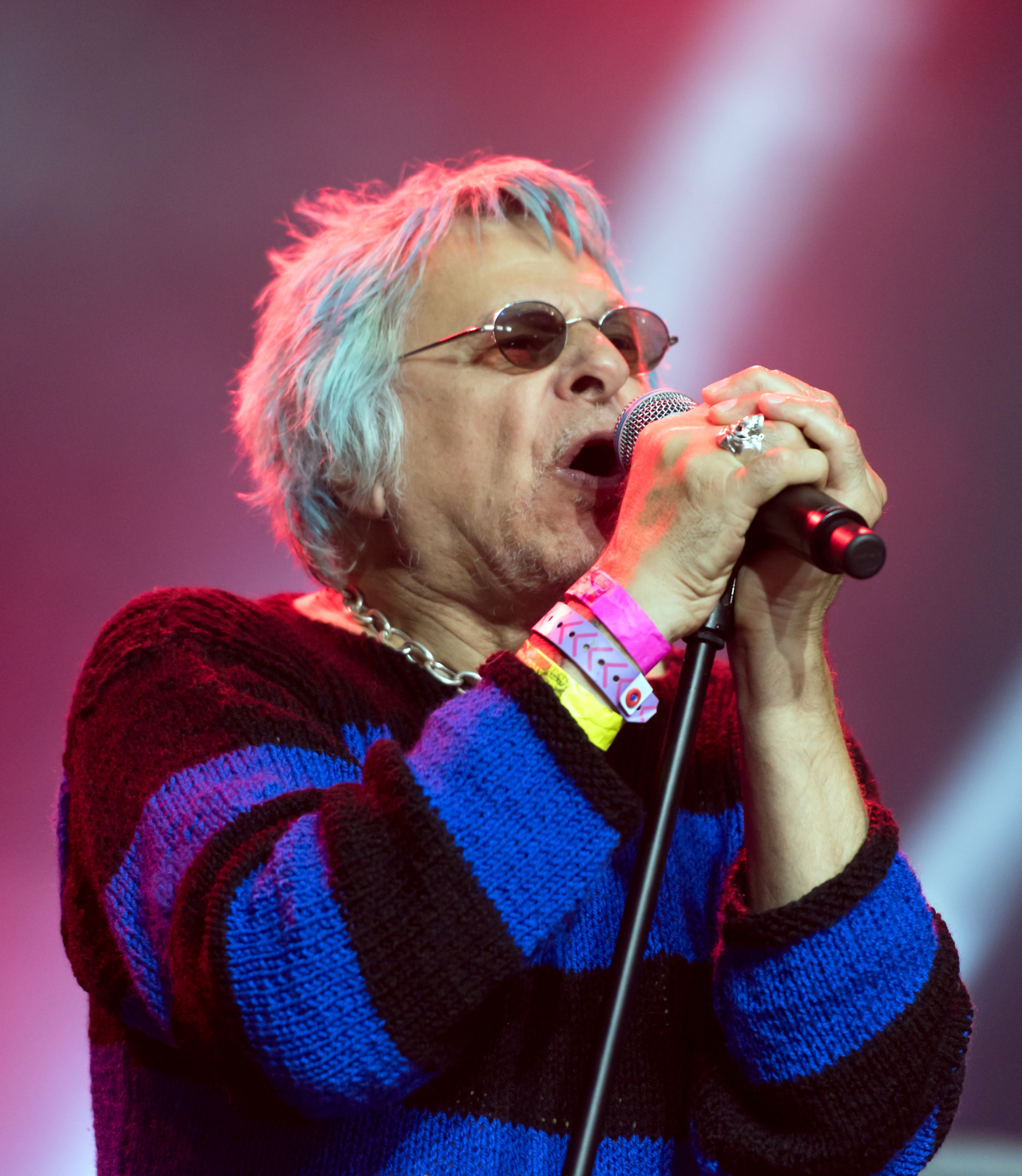
- Harper at Hellfest 2017

Background information
- Born: David Charles Perez; 25 May 1944 (age 82); Gawber, Barnsley, England
- Genres: Punk rock; street punk; R&B; garage rock
- Occupations: Singer; songwriter
- Years active: 1964–present
- Member of: U.K. Subs

Charlie Harper (born David Charles Perez, 25 May 1944) is a British singer, best known as the lead vocalist of the punk rock band U.K. Subs.

== Biography ==
Charlie Harper was born in Barnsley but moved to the Sussex countryside when he was eight years old. Harper attended a "radical secondary school" where he was the Chairman of the Young Farmer's Club. He left school at the age of 15 to take a job at Dodworth Colliery then went on to commence a hairdressing apprenticeship. Following the apprenticeship, Harper began busking, playing the guitar and harmonica. In 1970, Harper got married and began working as a hairdresser at his sister-in-law's shop.

He was a veteran of the London R&B scene at the time of the UK Subs being formed in 1976. His first band in 1964 was named Charlie Harper Free Press Band. Prior to performing as the UK Subs, he was the frontman and founder of The Marauders, who were a pub rock band. After seeing a couple of punk rock shows at The Roxy, the band changed their name to the Subversives and started playing punk rock. The name was eventually modified to U.K. Subs.

In 1980 his solo single release "Barmy London Army" spent one week at no. 68 in the UK Singles Chart. He has also recorded with his side project The Urban Dogs and released a solo album entitled Stolen Property and a second solo single "Freaked". As well as singing he also plays the harmonica and bass, he played rhythm guitar on the UK Subs album Diminished Responsibility. He still typically performs between 150 and 200 gigs per year with the UK Subs.

== Discography ==
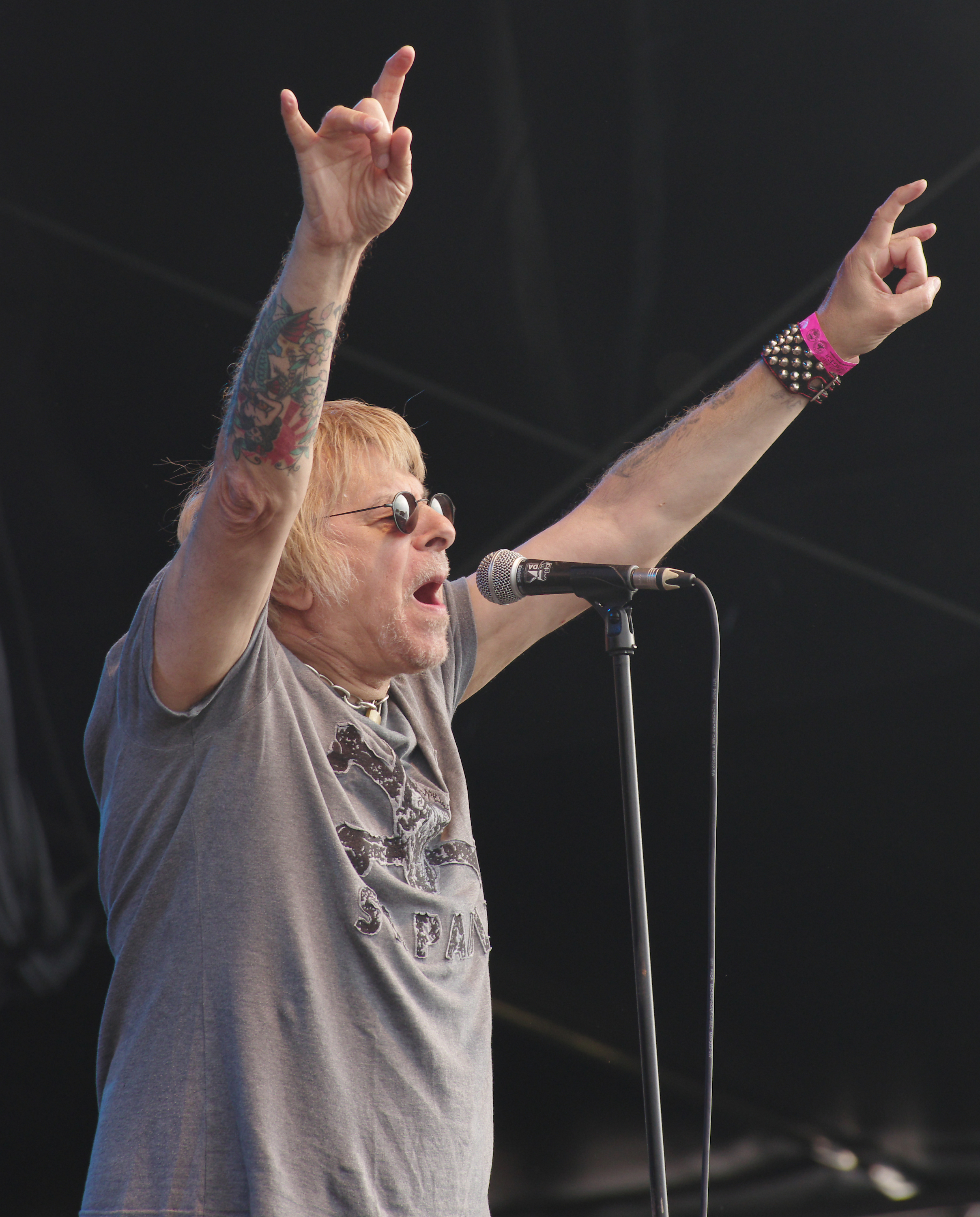
Harper performing in 2013

=== Solo ===
==== Albums ====
- Stolen Property (1981), Flicknife

==== Singles ====
- "Barmy London Army" / "Talk Is Cheap" (1980), Gem
- "Freaked" / "Jo" (1981), Ramkup - UK Indie no. 17

=== with UK Subs ===
see U.K. Subs discography

=== with The Urban Dogs ===
==== Albums ====
- Urban Dogs (1983), Fall Out - UK Indie no. 18
- No Pedigree (1985), Flicknife
- Wipeout Beach (1998), Raw Power
- Bonefield (2012), Time and Matter
- Attack! (2016), Time and Matter

==== Singles ====
- "New Barbarians" (1982), Fall Out - UK Indie no. 15
- "Limo Life" (1983), Fall Out - UK Indie no. 16
- "(We Don't Want No) Millenium Dome" (1999), Raw Power
- "Rebellion Song" (2014), Time and Matter
- "Trick or Treat" (2016), Time and Matter

=== with Charlie's Harbour Rats ===
- "Rollin' In My Sweet Baby's Arms" single (2012), Punkerama

=== with Captain Sensible ===
- Too Much Reality EP (2013), Time and Matter

=== Compilations ===
- New Barbarians: The Best Of Charlie Harper And The Urban Dogs (1999), Captain Oi!

== Recorded tributes ==
- "Charlie Harper" - a track by The Bus Station Loonies appeared on their "Bare Faced Hypocrisy Sells Records" EP on the Ruptured Ambitions label in 1998. A different version was on their 1999 Mad Frank's Zonal Disco album.
- "Charlie Harper" - a song recorded and written by Demob. Unreleased to date. A live version on YouTube.
- "Uncle Charlie" is a tribute song by Anti-Nowhere League from their LP, The Cage.
