= U.K. Subs =

English punk rock band

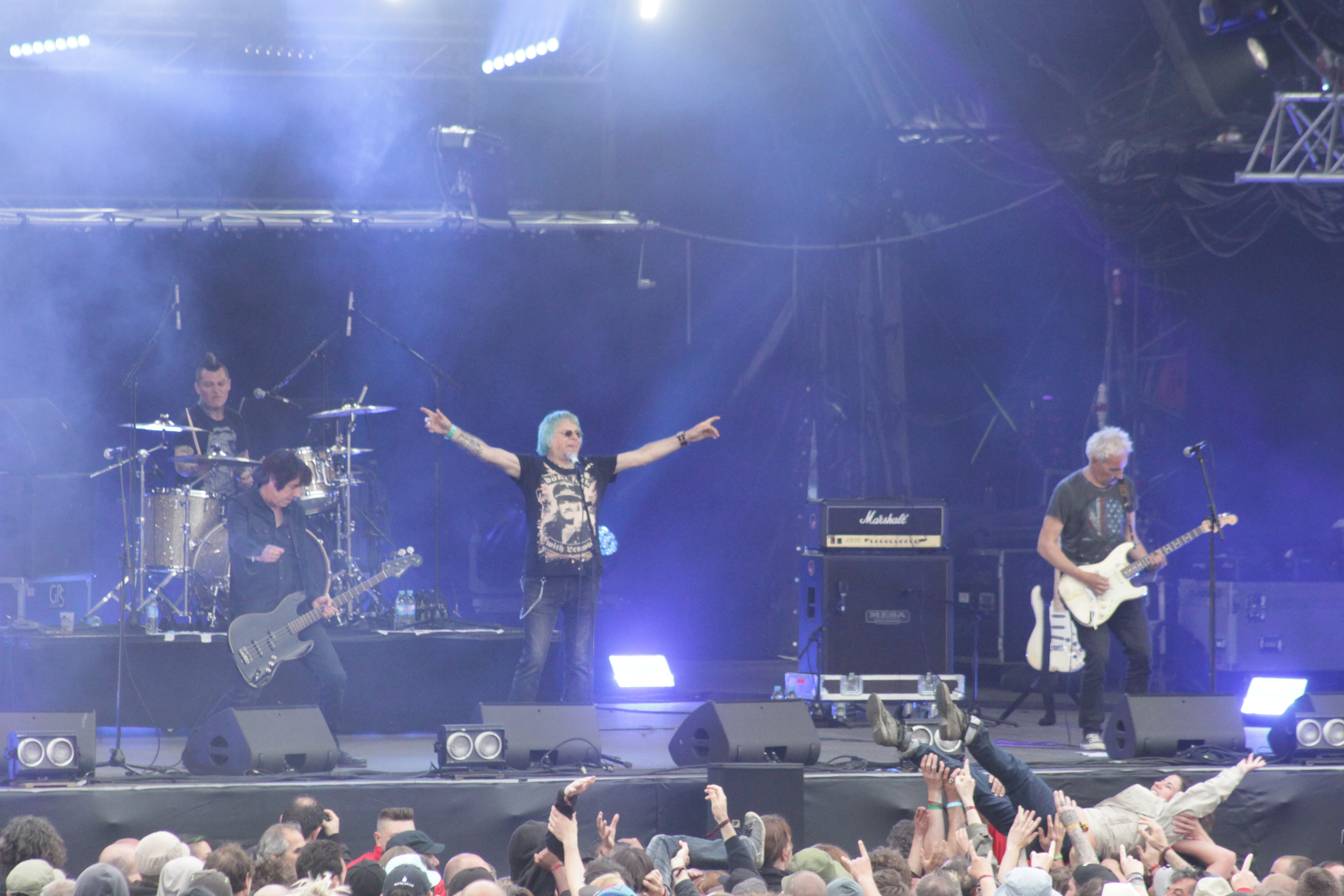
- U.K. Subs at Hellfest 2016

Background information
- Origin: London, England
- Genres: Punk rock, street punk, hardcore punk
- Years active: 1976–present
- Labels: New Red Archives, Cleopatra Records, Captain Oi!, Fall Out, Time & Matter, Diablo, RCA, Punkerama, NEMS, GEM
- Members: Charlie Harper; Alvin Gibbs; Stefan Häublein; Abel Inglis
- Past members: Steve Straughan; Kevin Nixon; Jamie Oliver; Nicky Garratt; Steve Slack; Tommy Krash; Terry Bones; Dave Humphries; Gregor Kramer; Jacek Ostoya; Pete Davies; David Ayer; Alan Campbell; Rory Lyons; Belvy K Matthew McCoy; Steve Roberts; Brian Barnes; Tony Kibbutz; Paul Slack; Chema Zurita; Jason Willer; Mal Asling; Leo Mortimer; Benjie Bollox; Rab Fae Beith; Derek Reid; Eric Baconstrip; Sarah Copson; Gizz Butt; Lars Frederiksen
- Website: uksubs.co.uk

U.K. Subs are an English punk rock band, among the earliest in the first wave of British punk. Formed in 1976, the mainstay of the band has been vocalist Charlie Harper, originally a singer in Britain's R&B scene. They were one of the first hardcore punk bands.

== Career ==
=== 1976–1978 ===
Although the U.K. Subs were part of the original punk movement in England, the band originally started playing as part of the pub rock scene under the name the Marauders. In 1976, after seeing a couple of punk rock shows at The Roxy, the band decided to become a punk rock band, changing their name at first to the Subversives but later modifying it to the U.K. Subs. The band consisted of founder Charlie Harper, guitarist Nicky Garratt, bassist Paul Slack, and a drummer who went under the name Rory Lyons. By the time the band recorded their first single, Pete Davies had replaced Lyons and was the band's regular drummer.

Their style combined the energy of punk with the rock and roll edge of the then-thriving pub rock scene. The band's first six hit singles, including "Stranglehold", "Warhead", "Teenage", and "Tomorrow's Girls", all managed to enter the Top 40 of the UK Singles Chart. Their first four albums also made the UK chart, but they never saw any single or album make the charts after 1981.

The first two songs released by the band were on the April 1978 Farewell to the Roxy album. The two songs, "I Live in a Car" and "Telephone Numbers", were recorded live at a 31 December 1977 show at The Roxy. The U.K. Subs were the first band on the bill at the show that night with Rory Lyons on drums. The recording of this show was later released as the album Live Kicks in 1980.

In 1978, the band released their first single, "CID", on City Records, a UK-based underground label. The band played two John Peel sessions in 1978, and a third in June 1979, for BBC Radio 1. These sessions were subsequently released together on a single album, Peel Sessions, in 2003. Also in 1978, the band opened for the Police at some concerts. In 1979, Julien Temple wrote and directed a short film, Punk Can Take It, a parody of wartime documentaries, that consisted mainly of U.K. Subs playing live on stage. The film was released theatrically.

=== 1979–1981 ===
In May 1979, the band signed to GEM Records, a punk rock offshoot of RCA Records. Their first single for GEM, "Stranglehold", was released in June 1979. It was followed by "Tomorrow's Girls", which was released in August 1979. Their debut album, Another Kind of Blues, was released in October 1979; their second album, Brand New Age followed in April 1980. Several EPs were also released in this period, and their singles "Teenage" and "Warhead" both made the UK charts. Their third album, titled Crash Course, was recorded live at the Rainbow Theatre in London on 30 May 1980 during the Brand New Age tour. Released in 1980, it was their biggest-selling album ever.

In June 1980, Davies and Slack left the band and were replaced with bassist Alvin Gibbs and drummer Steve Roberts. At this point some of the songs took on a more heavy metal-influenced edge. In February 1981, the band released their fourth album, Diminished Responsibility, which was the final U.K. Subs album to chart in the UK. In April 1981, they released the non-album single "Keep on Running (Til You Burn)", their sixth single for GEM, and the last single by the U.K. Subs to chart in the UK. It was also their last release on GEM Records as the label folded soon after the release of the single.

=== 1982–1983 ===
The band recorded their next album at the rural Jacobs Studio in Farnham, Surrey, in southern England. Endangered Species was released 19 March 1982 on the band's new label, NEMS, which also folded shortly after the release of the album. Harper and Garratt both consider this album to be the U.K. Subs' best album. Following the recording of the album, Steve Roberts was fired at the end of 1981 and the Subs used both Mal Aisling and John Towe as replacements. The band toured the U.S. in support of the album, hoping to get signed to a U.S. label. It was their second tour of the U.S.; the first occurring in 1979. In July 1982, they became the first Western band to perform in Poland since the imposition of martial law, and the suppression of the trade union Solidarity. Their concert was held in Gdańsk, and they were supported by Brygada Kryzys.

In 1983, the band released the three-song Shake Up the City EP on Abstract Records, which they also recorded at Jacobs studios. Drummer Kim Wylie played on the EP and for the subsequent tours of the UK, Europe, and the US. They again played several concerts in Poland in 1983 with new wave Polish band Republika. Differences in musical direction, as well as the inability to secure a US record deal, led to Gibbs, Garrett, and Harper going their separate ways, although Harper would continue to use the U.K. Subs name with a frequently-changing line-up of members backing him. The three would reunite for the first time in July 1988 to record Killing Time.

=== 1984–2021 ===
In 1991, U.K. Subs also had Lars Frederiksen (now of Rancid) on guitar for a 30-date UK tour.

The U.K. Subs song "Down on the Farm" was covered by Guns N' Roses at Farm Aid in 1990 and on their 1993 album "The Spaghetti Incident?". "We were just doing it for the fun of it," recalled Slash. "And it was sounding good, so we recorded it."

U.K. Subs joined the bill for the 2006 Fiend Fest. The band have toured with The Misfits, The Adicts, Osaka Popstar, Agent Orange, and The Ramones. The U.K. Subs song "Warhead" is played in the movie This Is England. U.K. Subs are one of the regular bands to play the Rebellion Festival nearly every year since its origins as The Holidays in the Sun Festival in 1996.

In 2002, the band was featured with D.R.I and The Eight Bucks Experiment on a seven-inch compilation record called F*#k You Punks vol.3, with an anti-terrorist song called "Terrorista".

In 2007, drummer Jamie Oliver was a contestant on the UK quiz show Nothing But the Truth. Vocalist Charlie Harper was among the panel of witnesses. Oliver reached the £5,000 mark, but lost it all in a bid to double his winnings.

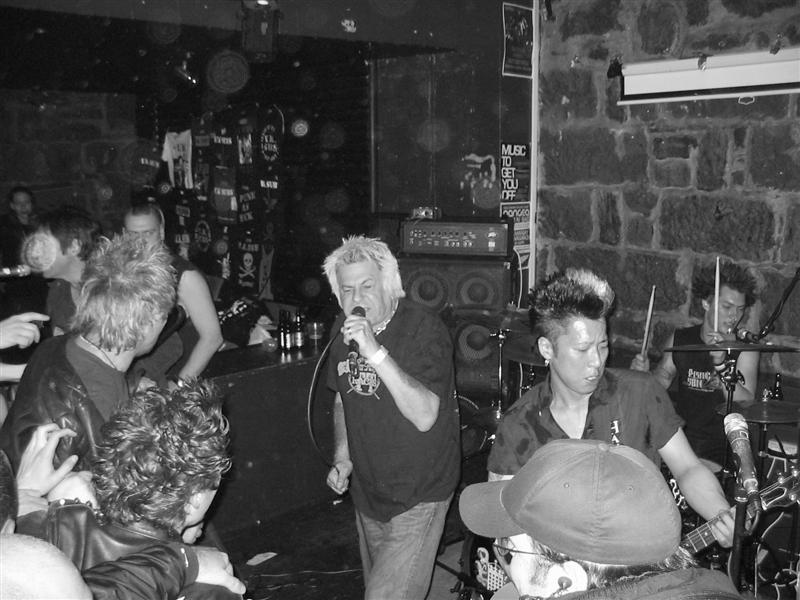
U.K. Subs performing in 2007

In recent years, the band's work has been critical of British politician Nick Clegg, with the 2013 song "Coalition Government Blues" describing the Liberal Democrats' leader as "liking his perks". The band's 2015 album Yellow Leader was widely suspected of referring to Clegg, with yellow being the official colour of his political party.

To celebrate 40 years since its release, Demon Records issued a special-edition copy of Another Kind of Blues in a box set of two 10" coloured vinyl discs on 13 April 2019. This was soon followed by the next album in succession, Brand New Age on 12 July 2019. Crash Course and Diminished Responsibility have also been reissued, and Cleopatra Records has released an expanded version of Endangered Species. In September 2021, to celebrate 40 years since the band's concert at Gossips, the official live cassette of the show was rereleased on CD and download as Danger: The Chaos Tape, via Cherry Red.

On 17 October 2021, Alvin Gibbs announced on Facebook that "Charlie Harper, Steve Straughan and I have decided Jamie Oliver will no longer continue as drummer for the UK Subs" over "his post seemingly celebrating the tragic and abhorrent death of Conservative MP, David Amess". Anti-Pasti drummer Kevin Nixon agreed to temporarily take over the role vacated by Oliver, enabling the band to meet live commitments in France in October 2021.

=== 2022–present: Final studio album and tours ===
In what was advertised as the U.K. Subs' final album, Reverse Engineering – a studio record of new material – was released on 1 July 2022.

On 20 August 2022, the band played what was billed as their "last ever" show on the island of Ireland, performing at Voodoo in Belfast.

Former drummer Steve Roberts, AKA Steve ZeSuicide, died on 13 October 2022.

In December 2022, the band announced drummer Dave Humphries had left them.

European and UK tours planned for 2023 were advertised as being the "final full" tours by the U.K. Subs. The band added: "Rest assured – the band will then continue to play Festivals and the occasional mini weekend tour in various countries as and when". The UK tour culminated with five consecutive sold-out nights at the 100 Club in London.

In March 2025, three members of the band were, upon arrival at LAX, denied entry into the United States, subsequently detained and deported back to the UK. Bass player Alvin Gibbs said of the incident: "While I never expected to be thrown out of America at the age of 67, I find myself somewhat proud of the fact." Singer Charlie Harper did get into the country and played a festival in Los Angeles with three guest musicians filling in.

== Album titles and later releases ==
Successive U.K. Subs album titles start with consecutive letters of the alphabet, although the band released several live albums and compilations that were not part of the sequence of 26 alphabetical titles. All but one of their 21 studio albums are a part of this 26-album sequence. Reverse Engineering and the two studio albums consisting solely of covers, Subversions and Subversions II, all released after concluding the 26 album sequence, are not part of the sequence. The six non-studio albums included in the sequence comprise four live albums; a compilation album titled Sub Mission: The Best of the U.K. Subs 1982–1998 which also contained a bonus disc with a live recording from a show in Bristol in 1991; and Peel Sessions, which compiled their three late-1970s sessions with BBC DJ John Peel.

In May 2016, the band released an album starting with the letter "Z", Ziezo, which completed their alphabetical series of album titles. The album was recorded in November 2015 at Perry Vale Studios in south London. At that time the band announced that, although they intended to continue to release EPs and singles, Ziezo would be their last full album. The album was funded through the Crowdfunding site Pledge Music starting on 1 November 2015.

After releasing Ziezo, the Subs released a double single in 2017 and an EP in 2018 in addition to two albums of covers, titled Subversions and Subversions II, which were released in 2018 and 2019, respectively.

On 1 July 2022, Cleopatra Records released the Subs' latest studio album, Reverse Engineering. Alvin Gibbs announced on behalf of the U.K. Subs in January 2021 that the band had begun recording the new album due to the large amount of new material they had written both as a band and individually. He said that this new album "will categorically be the last ever UK Subs album".

== Musical style ==
The UK Subs' tempo exceeded that of many of the original British punk bands, earning them a reputation as a pioneer of hardcore punk music. They retained limited elements of rhythm and blues due to Harper's previous years as an R&B singer. Music writer Colin Larkin described the band as specialising in "shambolic sub-three-minute bursts of alcohol-driven rock ‘n’ roll".

== Band members ==
Current

- Charlie Harper - lead vocals and harmonica (1976–present)
- Alvin Gibbs - bass (1980–1983, 1988, 1996, 1999–2002, 2003–present)
- Steve Straughan - guitar (2016–present)
- Stefan Häublein - drums (2023–present)

Former

- Richard Anderson - guitar (1976–77)
- Greg Brown - guitar (1977)
- Steve Slack - bass (1976–77, 1983–1984)
- Rory Lyons - drums (1976–1977)
- Robbie Harper - drums, guitar (Rob Milne) (1977)
- Steve J Jones - drums (1977, 1983–1984)
- Nicky Garratt - guitar (1977–1983, 1988, 1996, 1999–2002, 2004–2010)
- Paul Slack - bass (1977–1981, 2008–2010)
- Robby Baldock - drums (1978)
- Pete Davies - drums (1978–1980, 1984, 1991–1996, 2007, 2008)
- Carlos Hyena - guitar (1978)
- Ian "Tanner" Tansley - drums (1980 on Brand New Age Tour – filling in for a sick Pete Davies)
- Steve Roberts - drums (1981–1982, 1987, 2002); died 2022
- Adam Griffiths - bass (1981–1982)
- Mal Asling AKA 'Sol Mintz' - drums (1982)
- John Towe AKA 'Kim Wylie' - drums (1982–1983, 2003)
- Captain Scarlet (David Lloyd) - guitar (1983–1984)
- Tim Britta - guitar (1984)
- Jim Moncur - guitar (1984–1987)
- Tezz Roberts - bass (1984), guitar (1984–85, 1995, 2002), drums (1988, 1999)
- John Armitage - bass (1984–1985)
- Matthew "Turkey" Best - drums (1984)
- Rab Fae Beith - drums (1984–1986); died 2023
- Ricky McGuire - bass (1985–1986)
- Mark Barratt - bass (1986–1987)
- Darrell Barth - guitar (1986–87, 1989–91, 1999)
- Geoff Sewell - drums (1986)
- Knox - guitar (1987)
- Alan Lee - guitar (1987–89)
- Flea (Dave Farrelly) - bass (1987–91)
- Dave Wilkinson - drums (1987)
- Duncan Smith - drums (1987–88)
- Belvy K - drums (1988)
- Matt McCoy - drums (1988–92, 1993, 1995)
- Andy McCoy - guitar (1988)
- Leo Mortimer - drums (1989–90)
- Karl Morris - guitar (1990–1992, 1993)
- Jeff Moe - drums (1991)
- Lars Frederiksen - guitar (1991)
- Johan - guitar (1991)
- Scott Snowden - guitar (1992)
- Alan Campbell - guitar (1992–2004)
- Derek Reid - bass (1995)
- Brian Barnes - bass (1992–1994, 1996–2001, 2002–2004, 2008)
- Greg Cahill - drums (1993 Canada, Argentina tours)
- Dave Ayer - drums (1995–1997)
- Gizz Butt - guitar (1996)
- Phil Pain - guitar (1996)
- Benjie Bollox - drums (1996)
- Blitz - drums (1996)
- Michael Richter - drums (1997)
- Gary Baldy (Ostell) - drums (1997–99)
- Carly Guarino - bass (1997)
- Andy Frantic - bass (1997–99)
- Pumpy - drums (1999–2000)
- Tommy Couch - drums (1999–2000)
- Gizz Lazlo - drums (1999, 2006)
- Jason Willer - drums (2001–2006)
- Simon Rankin - guitar (2001), bass (2001–2002)
- Bones - bass (2002)
- Criss Damage - drums (2002)
- Darrah - drums (2002)
- Jay - drums (2002)
- Tommy Krash - bass (2002)
- Alistair Chesters - bass (2002–2007)
- Pete Honkamaki - bass (2002–2003)
- Steve Crittall 'Soho Steve' - guitar (2003)
- Clara Wiseman - bass (2005)
- Jet - guitar (2005–2016)
- Eric Baconstrip - drums (2005)
- Peter 'Goldblade' Byrchmore - guitar (2006)
- Chema Zurita - bass (2007–2011, 2016)
- Jared Melville - drums (2008)
- Peter Revesz - bass (2008)
- Tony Barber - bass (2008)
- Matthew Hindle - bass (2010)
- Jamie Oliver - drums (2005–2021)
- Kevin Nixon - drums (2021)
- Steven Donnelly - bass (2022 Irish tour dates)
- "Magic" Dave Humphries - drums (2021–2022)

== Discography ==
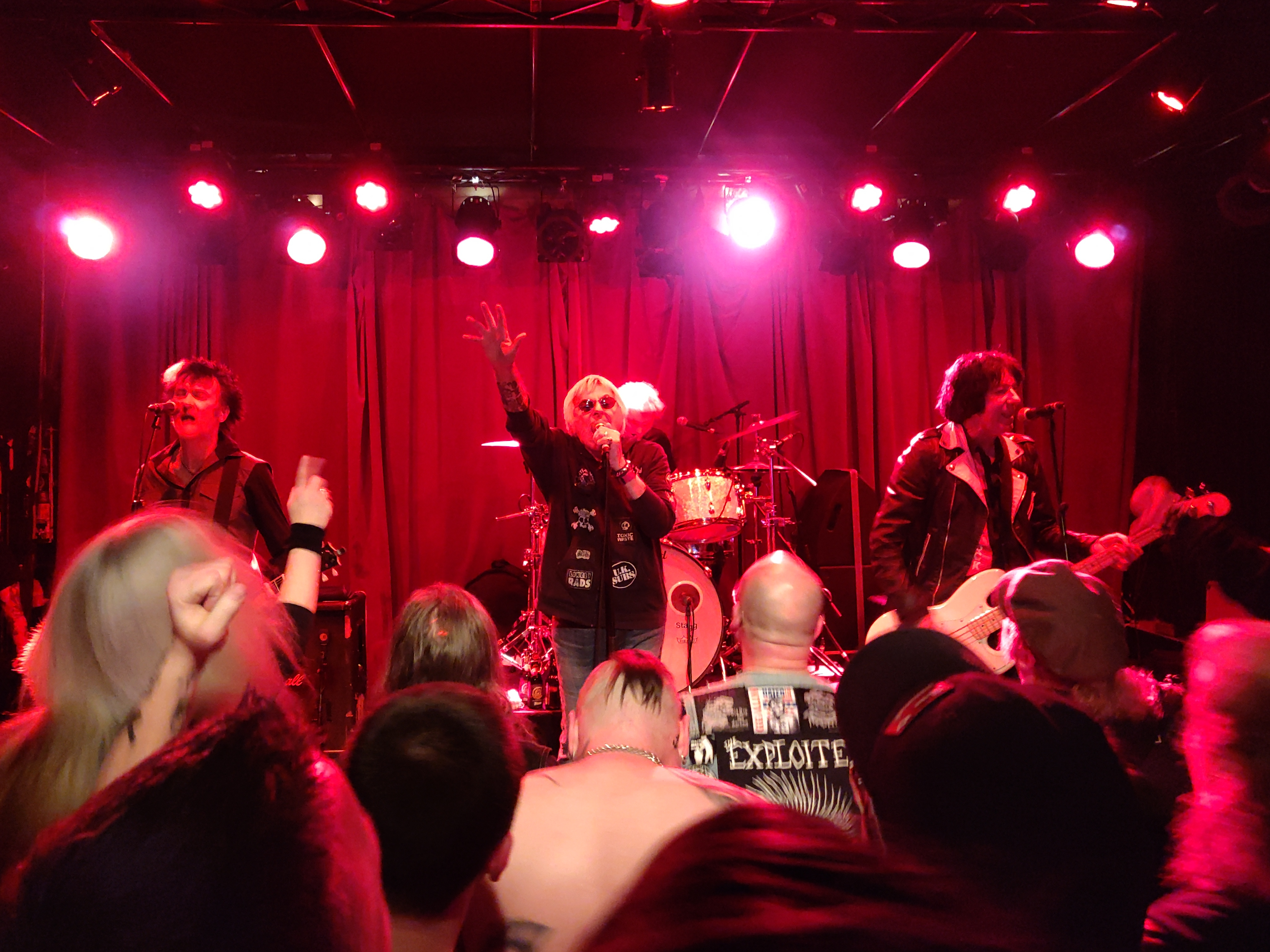
U.K. Subs performing in 2020

=== Studio albums ===
- Another Kind of Blues (1979; UK No. 21)
- Brand New Age (1980; UK No. 18)
- Diminished Responsibility (1981; UK No. 18)
- Endangered Species (1982)
- Flood of Lies (1983)
- Huntington Beach (1985)
- Japan Today (1987)
- Killing Time (1988)
- Mad Cow Fever (1991)
- Normal Service Resumed (1993)
- Occupied (1996)
- Quintessentials (1997)
- Riot (1997)
- Universal (2002)
- Work in Progress (10 January 2011)
- XXIV (6 February 2013)
- Yellow Leader (3 August 2015)
- Ziezo (2 May 2016)
- Subversions (22 June 2018)
- Subversions II (28 June 2019)
- Reverse Engineering (1 July 2022)

=== Compilation albums ===
- Recorded 1979–1981 (1982)
- Demonstration Tapes (1984)
- Subs Standards (1986)
- Raw Material (1986)
- A.W.O.L. (1987; US only)
- The Singles 1978–1982 (1989)
- Down on the Farm (A collection of the less obvious) (1991)
- Los Exitos En Singles 1978–1985 (1992; Argentina only)
- Scum of the Earth-Best Of (1993)
- The Punk Is Back (1995)
- Self-Destruct – Punk Can Take It 2 (1997)
- Peel Sessions (1997)
- Punk Rock Rarities (1998)
- The Punk Singles Collection (1998)
- Sub Mission: The Best of the U.K. Subs 1982–1998 (1999)
- Time Warp: Greatest Hits (2001)
- Before You Were Punk (2004)
- Original Punks Original Hits (2006)
- An Introduction to The U.K. Subs (2006)
- Complete Riot (2006)
- Greatest Hits (2009)

=== Live albums ===
- Live Kicks (1979; recorded live at the Roxy 1977)
- Crash Course (1980; UK No. 8)
- Dance & Travel in the Robot Age (1980; bootleg live album recorded in Milan)
- Live in London (1980; release of Live Kicks plus the rest of Farewell to the Roxy; Australia only)
- Danger: The Chaos Tape (1981, re-released 2021)
- Gross Out USA (Live) (1984)
- Left For Dead (1986)
- In Action (10th Anniversary) (1986)
- Live in Paris (1989)
- Europe Calling (1990)
- Live At the Pipeline (1996; USA)
- Live in the Warzone (1998)
- Countdown (Live) (2001)
- World War (Live) (2003)
- Staffordshire Bull (Live) (2004)
- Live & Loud (2005)
- Violent State (2005)

=== EPs ===
- "C.I.D." (1978)
- "Stranglehold" (1979)
- "Tomorrows Girls" (1979)
- "She's Not There" / "Kicks" (1979) – No. 36 UK
- "Warhead" (1980)
- "Teenage" (1980)
- "Keep on Running EP Version" (1981)
- "Shake Up The City" (1982)
- "Another Typical City" (1983)
- "The Magic" (1984)
- "This Gun Says" (1985)
- "Live in Holland" (1986)
- "Hey Santa" (1987)
- "Motivator" (1988)
- "Sabre Dance" (1989)
- "The Road is Long, The Road is Hard" (1993)
- "War on the Pentagon" (1997; U.S. only)
- "Day of the Dead" (1997; U.S. only)
- "Cyberjunk" (1997; U.S. only)
- "Riot" (1998)
- "The Revolution's Here" (2000)
- "Warhead" (2008; CD EP)
- "Screaming Senile" (2018)

=== Singles ===
- "Stranglehold" – 1979 – No. 26 UK
- "Tomorrow's Girls" – 1979 – No. 28 UK
- "Warhead" – 1980 – No. 30 UK
- "Teenage" – 1980 – No. 32 UK
- "Party in Paris" – 1980 – No. 37 UK
- "Keep On Runnin' (Till You Burn)" – 1981 – No. 41
- "Countdown" (1981)
- "Another Typical City" (1983)
- "Postcard from L.A." (1994; split single, U.S. only)
- "Betrayal" (1995; U.S. only)
- "Drunken Sailor" (2002)
- "666 Yeah" (2006)
- "Product Supply" (2011)
- "Sensei" (2022)

=== Compilation appearances ===
- Punk And Disorderly III – The Final Solution (1983)
- Backstage pass – Pronit (1986)
- Hardcore Breakout USA (1990)
- Snowboard Addiction - Fun Ride (1994)
- Skaters Gear - 6 (1995)
- Hardcore Breakout USA Volume 2 (1995)
- The British Punk Invasion Vol 2 (1996)
- The Punk, The Bad & The Ugly (1997)
- At War With Society (1998)
- At War With Society – II (1999)
- A Triple Dose Of Punk (1999)
- Mighty Attack (1999)
- Smells Like Bleach: A Punk Tribute to Nirvana (2001)
- Angry Songs and Bitter Words (2003)
- Hardcore Breakout USA 1,2,3,... (2004)
- Radio Olmos 1993 (two UK Subs tracks recorded live in an Argentinian prison)

=== Tributes and references ===
- "I Lost My Love (to a UK Sub)", track by The Gonads (1982)
- "(Give Me) Charlie Harper (Any Day)", track by The Bus Station Loonies (1996)
- "Uncle Charlie", track from The Cage by Anti-Nowhere League (2016)
- "Song For Charlie" track from Many of My Friends Are Simians But Only A Few Are Gorillas by I Am Chimp! (2015)
