= New Red Archives =

Record label

- Founded: 1987
- Founder: Nicky Garratt
- Distributor: Lumberjack Mordam Music Group
- Genre: Hardcore punk, punk rock
- Country of origin: U.S.
- Location: San Francisco, California

New Red Archives is an American independent record label based in California's San Francisco Bay Area, mainly home to punk rock bands. Started in 1987, the label began by releasing punk and hardcore punk records on coloured vinyl. Starting in summer 1990 after a re-location from Brooklyn, the label was based out of Hollywood. In 1996 The label signed an exclusive distribution deal with Dutch East India Trading. By 1998 the label had moved to San Francisco. Starting in the early 2000s the label released CDs as well as vinyl, through the distribution company Lumberjack Mordam Music Group.

New Red Archives catalog includes early 1980s NY-based hardcore groups Kraut and Reagan Youth, Christ On A Crutch featuring Foo Fighters bassist Nate Mendel, Ten Bright Spikes featuring members of UK Subs and Social Unrest, No Use For A Name who eventually featured Foo Fighters guitar player Chris Shiflett, politically charged punk band Anti-Flag, hardcore punk legends Hogan's Heroes, and first wave punk rock/ street punk group the U.K. Subs.

== Acquisition by Cleopatra ==
In 2012 Cleopatra Records acquired New Red Archives entire catalog of releases, and in 2013 New Red Archives became a division of Cleopatra Records. The full catalog comes in under 140 albums all together including compilation releases.

As of 2017 Cleopatra has released 33 of the original releases including the compilations Hardcore Breakout USA 1,2,3,... and At War With Society. The catalog peaked at just about under 30 bands on the label roster and of those groups 12 were released through Cleopatra including Reagan Youth, U.K. Subs, Ultraman, Kraut, Hogan's Heroes, Samiam, Christ On A Crutch, The Nukes, Social Unrest, Snap-Her, Anti Flag, The Loudmouths, and Ten Bright Spikes.

== List of New Red Archives artists ==
- Accustomed To Nothing
- Anti-Flag
- Badtown Boys
- Christ On A Crutch
- Corrupted Ideals
- Crucial Youth
- Dead Lazlo's Place
- Dehumanized
- Fiz Gig
- Hogan's Heroes
- Jack Killed Jill
- Kraut
- The Loudmouths
- MDC
- No Use for a Name
- The Nukes
- Post Ejaculation Depression
- Reagan Youth
- Samiam
- Snap-Her
- Social Unrest
- Squat
- Swingin' Utters
- Ten Bright Spikes
- The Wrench
- Ultraman
- U.K. Subs

== See also ==
- Cleopatra Records
