= Kraut (band) =

American punk band

- Origin: New York City, U.S.
- Genres: Punk rock, hardcore punk
- Years active: 1981–1986
- Labels: Cabbage, New Red Archives
- Past members: Davy Gunner; Doug Holland; Don Cowan; Johnny Feedback; Christopher Smith

Kraut was a New York City punk rock/hardcore punk band formed by Doug Holland in 1981. The original members were Davy Gunner (vocals), Doug Holland (guitar/vocals), Don Cowan (bass/vocals), and Johnny Feedback (drums/vocals).

== History ==
Kraut's first performance was opening for the Clash at Bonds International Casino in New York on June 11, 1981.

Their debut single, "Kill for Cash", and second single, "Unemployed", were both released in 1981 on the band's own Cabbage Records label.

While recording their debut album, An Adjustment to Society (produced by Ryk Oakley), they opened for the Professionals at The Channel in Boston. Former Sex Pistols guitarist Steve Jones became friends with Kraut and recorded extra guitar tracks for three songs on the album: "Kill for Cash", "Sell Out" and "Onward". The album was again self-released, distributed by Faulty Products. A video clip for "All Twisted" appeared in rotation on MTV, making Kraut the first independent band to be played on the station.

The band released a mini-album, Whetting the Scythe, in 1984, and toured the U.S.

By the mid-1980s, Kraut had added second guitarist Christopher Smith from Battalion of Saints, and developed a more hard rock/metal sound.

Guitarist Holland went on to play for New York hardcore band the Cro-Mags.

A Kraut reunion show with all four original members took place in 2002 at CBGB during the New York Thrash reunion, yielding the Live at CBGB's album.

== Discography ==
=== Studio albums ===
- An Adjustment to Society (1982, Cabbage Records/Faulty Products)
- Whetting the Scythe (1984, Cabbage Records/Enigma Records)
- An Adjustment to Society (2024, Cleopatra Records)

=== Singles ===
- "Kill for Cash" 7" (1981, Cabbage Records)
- "Unemployed" 7" (1981, Cabbage Records)
- "Kill for Cash" 7" (2024, Cleopatra Records)
- "Unemployed" 7" (2024, Cleopatra Records)

=== Live albums ===
- Night of Rage (1989, New Red Archives)
- Live at CBGB's (2004, New Red Archives)

=== Compilation albums ===
- The Movie (1990, New Red Archives)
- Complete Studio Recordings 1981–1986 (1995, New Red Archives)

=== Compilation appearances ===
- "Getaway" and "Last Chance" on New York Thrash (1982, ROIR)
- "Onwards" on Son of Oi! LP (1983, Syndicate Records)
- "Pyramids" on Something to Believe In LP (1983, BYO Records)
- "Don't Believe (Live)" on Bang Zoom No. 3 tape (1983, Bang Zoom)
- "Flossing With an E String" on Flipside Vinyl Fanzine LP (1984, Gasatanka Records)
- "Juvenile Justice" on Enigma Variations (1985, Enigma Records)
