= List of Danzig band members =

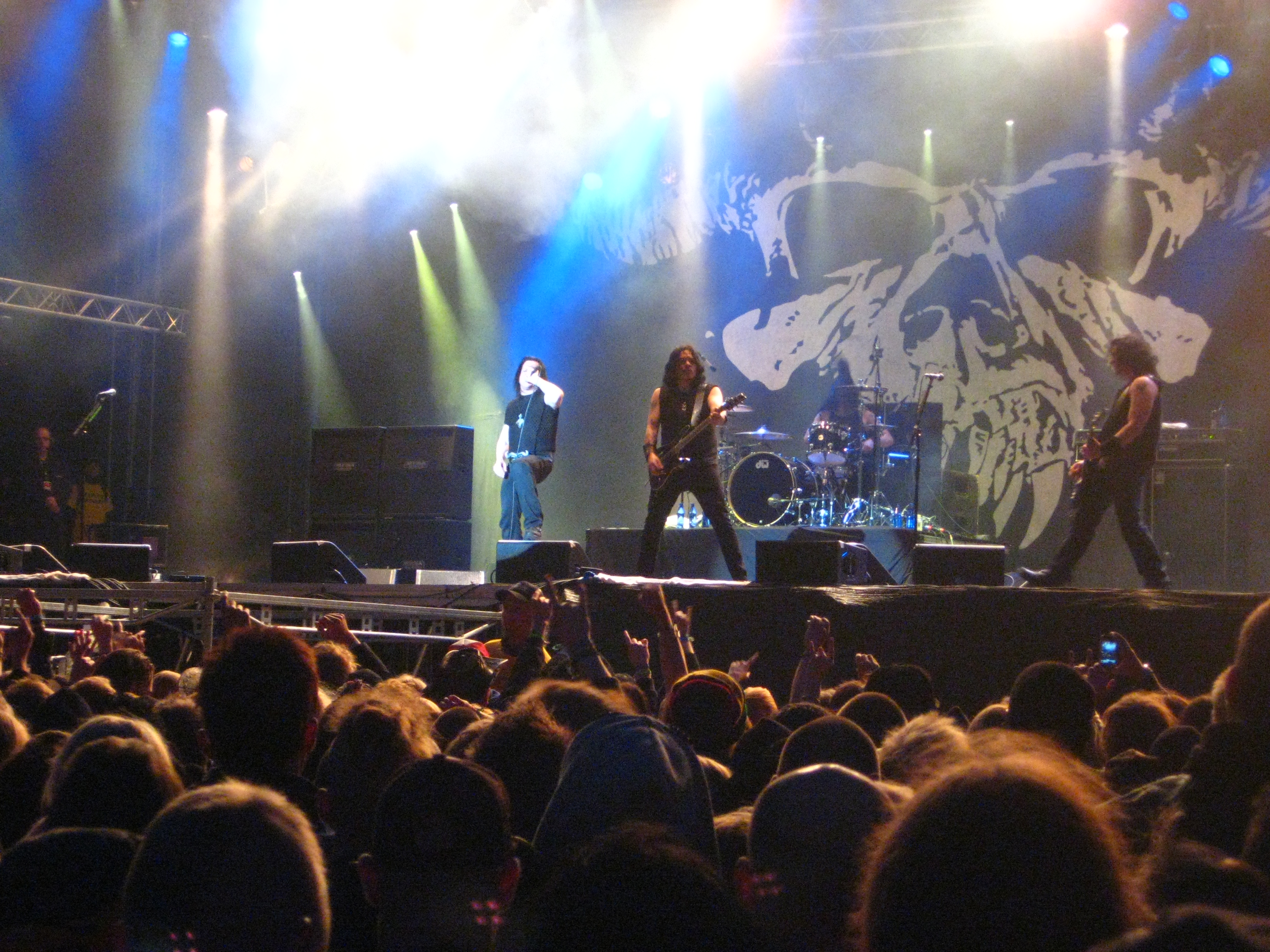
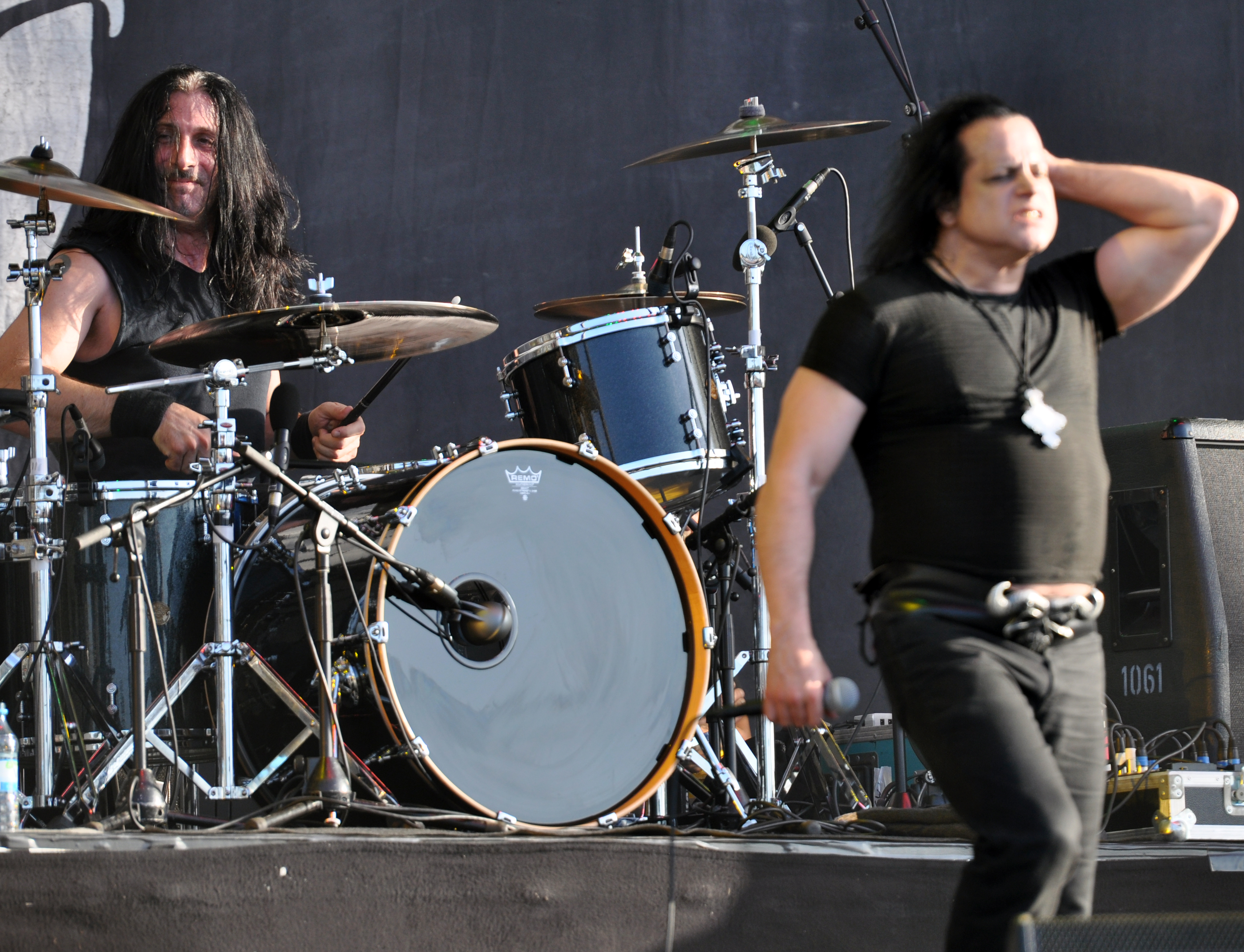
Current members of Danzig performing live in 2010 (top) and 2013 (bottom)

Danzig is an American heavy metal band from Lodi, New Jersey. Formed in 1987, the group evolved from Samhain and originally included eponymous vocalist and keyboardist Glenn Danzig, guitarist John Christ, bassist Eerie Von and drummer Chuck Biscuits. The band's current lineup includes Danzig, guitarist Tommy Victor (from 1996 to 1997, 2003 to 2005, and since 2008), touring bassist Steve Zing (since 2006), and drummer Karl Rosqvist (from 2007 to 2008, and since 2021).

== History ==
=== 1987–2000 ===
Danzig evolved from Samhain and originally included eponymous vocalist and keyboardist Glenn Danzig (real name Glenn Anzalone), guitarist John Christ (real name John Knoll), bassist Eerie Von (real name Eric Stellmann) and drummer Chuck Biscuits (real name Charles Montgomery). After recording four studio albums, Biscuits left Danzig in the summer of 1994 following a contractual dispute with the frontman. He was replaced by former Sugartooth drummer Joey Castillo, after Dave Grohl turned down an offer to join. Christ and Von also left the following year, announcing their departure from the band in July 1995 due to a "breakdown in communication", said to stem from "the monopoly Glenn Danzig [had] on songwriting".

After a brief hiatus, Danzig returned in 1996 with guitarist Mark Chaussee and bassist Josh "Lazie" Resnik (Castillo's cousin and drum technician), although the former left just three months later and was replaced by Prong frontman Tommy Victor. Both new members left in early 1997, after the conclusion of the touring cycle for Danzig 5: Blackacidevil. In September they were replaced by guitarist Dave Kushner and bassist Rob "Blasko" Nicholson. After one show on October 31, Kushner left the band and was later replaced by Jeff Chambers. Resnik also returned to the group later to take over from Nicholson, who left to join Rob Zombie's band. In the summer of 1999, Chambers was replaced by Todd Youth (real name Todd Schofield), after the former had recorded for the upcoming album Danzig 6:66 Satan's Child.

=== 2000 onwards ===
Resnik left Danzig for a second time in April 2000, with former D Generation bassist Howie Pyro (real name Howard Kusten) taking his place. The lineup of Danzig, Youth, Pyro and Castillo released Live on the Black Hand Side in 2001 and Danzig 777: I Luciferi in 2002, before Castillo left to join Queens of the Stone Age. He was replaced for two shows in October 2002 by Halfcocked's Charlee Johnson, and later by Type O Negative's Johnny Kelly, before Bevan Davies took over the following summer. The rest of the lineup also changed in 2003 – first it was announced that Youth had left the band, with Tommy Victor returning in his place; and a few weeks later it was added that Pyro had been replaced by former Nothingface bassist Jerry Montano. This lineup of the band released Circle of Snakes in 2004.

After touring in promotion of Circle of Snakes, Danzig went through more changes in personnel. First, Davies was replaced by the returning Kelly in January 2005. Victor parted ways with the group in June, with Joe Fraulob announced as his replacement a few months later. Fraulob himself left only a year later, with Type O Negative's Kenny Hickey taking over in September 2006. Steve Zing (real name Steven Grecco), Danzig's former bandmate in Samhain, also took over from Montano the following month. Youth returned to replace Hickey for a touring cycle the following year, before Victor returned for the group's 20th anniversary tour in 2008. The group has since released an additional three studio albums – Deth Red Sabaoth in 2010, Skeletons in 2015 and Black Laden Crown in 2017.

== Members ==
=== Current ===
Image	Name (real name)	Years active	Instruments	Release contributions
	Glenn Danzig (Glenn Anzalone)	1987–present	lead vocals; rhythm guitar; keyboards; bass (studio, 1995 and since 2006); occasional drums (studio, since 2008)	all Danzig releases
	Tommy Victor	1996–1997; 2003–2005; 2008–present	lead guitar; backing vocals; bass (studio, since 2008)	all Danzig releases from Circle of Snakes (2004) onwards
	Steve Zing (Steven Grecco)	2006–present (touring only)	bass; backing vocals	none to date – live performances only
	Karl Rosqvist	2007–2008; 2022–present	drums	Black Laden Crown (2017)

=== Former ===
Image	Name	Years active	Instruments	Release contributions
	John Christ (John Knoll)	1987–1995 (died 2026)	lead guitar; backing vocals	all Danzig releases from Danzig (1988) to Danzig 4 (1994); Live on the Black Hand Side (2001)
	Eerie Von (Eric Stellmann)	1987–1995	bass; backing vocals	all Danzig releases from Danzig (1988) to Danzig 4 (1994); Live on the Black Hand Side (2001)
	Chuck Biscuits (Charles Montgomery)	1987–1994	drums	all Danzig releases from Danzig (1988) to Danzig 4 (1994); Live on the Black Hand Side (2001)
	Joey Castillo	1994–2002	drums	all Danzig releases from Danzig 5: Blackacidevil (1996) to Danzig 777: I Luciferi (2002); Black Laden Crown (2017) – guest appearances on two tracks only; Danzig Sings Elvis (2020) one track only
	Josh "Lazie" Resnik	1996–1997; 1998–2000	bass	Danzig 5: Blackacidevil (1996) – one track only; Danzig 6:66 Satan's Child (1999)
	Mark Chaussee	1996	lead guitar	Danzig 5: Blackacidevil (1996) – two tracks only
	Rob "Blasko" Nicholson	1997–1998	bass; backing vocals	none – live performances only
	Dave Kushner	1997	lead guitar	none – live performances only
	Jeff Chambers	1998–1999	lead guitar	Danzig 6:66 Satan's Child (1999)
	Todd Youth (Todd Schofield)	1999–2003; 2007–2008 (died 2018)	lead guitar	Live on the Black Hand Side (2001); Danzig 777: I Luciferi (2002)
	Howie Pyro (Howard Kusten)	2000–2003 (died 2022)	bass; backing vocals	Live on the Black Hand Side (2001); Danzig 777: I Luciferi (2002)
	Charlee "X" Johnson	2002	drums	none – live performances only
	Johnny Kelly	2002–2003; 2005–2021	drums	Deth Red Sabaoth (2010); Skeletons (2015); Black Laden Crown (2017)
	Bevan Davies	2003–2005	drums	Circle of Snakes (2004)
	Jerry Montano	2003–2006	bass; backing vocals	Circle of Snakes (2004)
	Joe Fraulob	2005–2006	lead guitar	none – live performances only
	Kenny Hickey	2006–2007	lead guitar	none – live performances only

== Lineups ==
Period	Members	Releases
March 1987 – August 1994	Glenn Danzig – lead vocals, rhythm guitar, keyboards; Eerie Von – bass, backing vocals; John Christ – lead guitar, backing vocals; Chuck Biscuits – drums	Danzig (1988); Danzig II: Lucifuge (1990); Danzig III: How the Gods Kill (1992); Thrall-Demonsweatlive (1993); Danzig 4 (1994); Live on the Black Hand Side (2001) – eight tracks
September 1994 – July 1995	Glenn Danzig – lead vocals, rhythm guitar, keyboards; Eerie Von – bass, backing vocals; John Christ – lead guitar, backing vocals; Joey Castillo – drums	Live on the Black Hand Side (2001) – six tracks
July 1995 – June 1996	Glenn Danzig – vocals, guitars, bass, keyboards; Joey Castillo – drums	Danzig 5: Blackacidevil (1996)
June – September 1996	Glenn Danzig – vocals, rhythm guitar, keyboards; Joey Castillo – drums; Josh Lazie – bass; Mark Chaussee – lead guitar	Danzig 5: Blackacidevil (1996) – two tracks
September 1996 – March 1997	Glenn Danzig – lead vocals, rhythm guitar, keyboards; Joey Castillo – drums; Josh Lazie – bass; Tommy Victor – lead guitar, backing vocals	none
September – November 1997	Glenn Danzig – lead vocals, rhythm guitar, keyboards; Joey Castillo – drums; Dave Kushner – lead guitar; Blasko – bass, backing vocals	none
May 1998 – July 1999	Glenn Danzig – vocals, rhythm guitar, keyboards; Joey Castillo – drums; Josh Lazie – bass; Jeff Chambers – lead guitar	6:66 Satan's Child (1999)
September 1999 – March 2000	Glenn Danzig – vocals, rhythm guitar, keyboards; Joey Castillo – drums; Josh Lazie – bass; Todd Youth – lead guitar	none
March 2000 – August 2002	Glenn Danzig – lead vocals, rhythm guitar, keyboards; Joey Castillo – drums; Todd Youth – lead guitar; Howie Pyro – bass, backing vocals	Live on the Black Hand Side (2001) – 14 tracks; 777: I Luciferi (2002)
October – November 2002	Glenn Danzig – lead vocals, rhythm guitar, keyboards; Todd Youth – lead guitar; Howie Pyro – bass, backing vocals; Charlee X – drums	none
November 2002 – February 2003	Glenn Danzig – lead vocals, rhythm guitar, keyboards; Todd Youth – lead guitar; Howie Pyro – bass, backing vocals; Johnny Kelly – drums	none
March – June 2003	Glenn Danzig – lead vocals, rhythm guitar, keyboards; Johnny Kelly – drums; Tommy Victor – lead guitar, backing vocals; Jerry Montano – bass, backing vocals	none
June 2003 – January 2005	Glenn Danzig – lead vocals, rhythm guitar, keyboards; Tommy Victor – lead guitar, backing vocals; Jerry Montano – bass, backing vocals; Bevan Davies – drums	Circle of Snakes (2004)
January – June 2005	Glenn Danzig – lead vocals, rhythm guitar, keyboards; Tommy Victor – lead guitar, backing vocals; Jerry Montano – bass, backing vocals; Johnny Kelly – drums	none
September 2005 – September 2006	Glenn Danzig – lead vocals, rhythm guitar, keyboards; Jerry Montano – bass, backing vocals; Johnny Kelly – drums; Joe Fraulob – lead guitar	none
September – October 2006	Glenn Danzig – lead vocals, rhythm guitar, keyboards; Jerry Montano – bass, backing vocals; Johnny Kelly – drums; Kenny Hickey – lead guitar	none
October 2006 – September 2007	Glenn Danzig – vocals, rhythm guitar, bass, keyboards; Johnny Kelly – drums; Kenny Hickey – lead guitar; Steve Zing – bass, backing vocals (touring)	none
September 2007 – September 2008	Glenn Danzig – vocals, rhythm guitar, bass, keyboards; Johnny Kelly – drums; Steve Zing – bass, backing vocals (touring); Todd Youth – lead guitar	none
September 2008	Glenn Danzig – vocals, guitars, bass, keyboards, drums; Steve Zing – bass, backing vocals (touring); Karl Rosqvist – drums (touring)	none
September 2008 – August 2021	Glenn Danzig – lead vocals, rhythm guitar, bass, keyboards, drums; Steve Zing – bass, backing vocals (touring); Tommy Victor – lead guitar, bass, backing vocals; Johnny Kelly - drums	Deth Red Sabaoth (2010); Skeletons (2015); Black Laden Crown (2017); Danzig Sings Elvis (2020) without Kelly
May 2022 - present	Glenn Danzig – lead vocals, rhythm guitar, bass, keyboards; Steve Zing – bass, backing vocals (touring); Tommy Victor – lead guitar, bass, backing vocals; Karl Rosqvist – drums	none as of yet
