= Danzig discography =

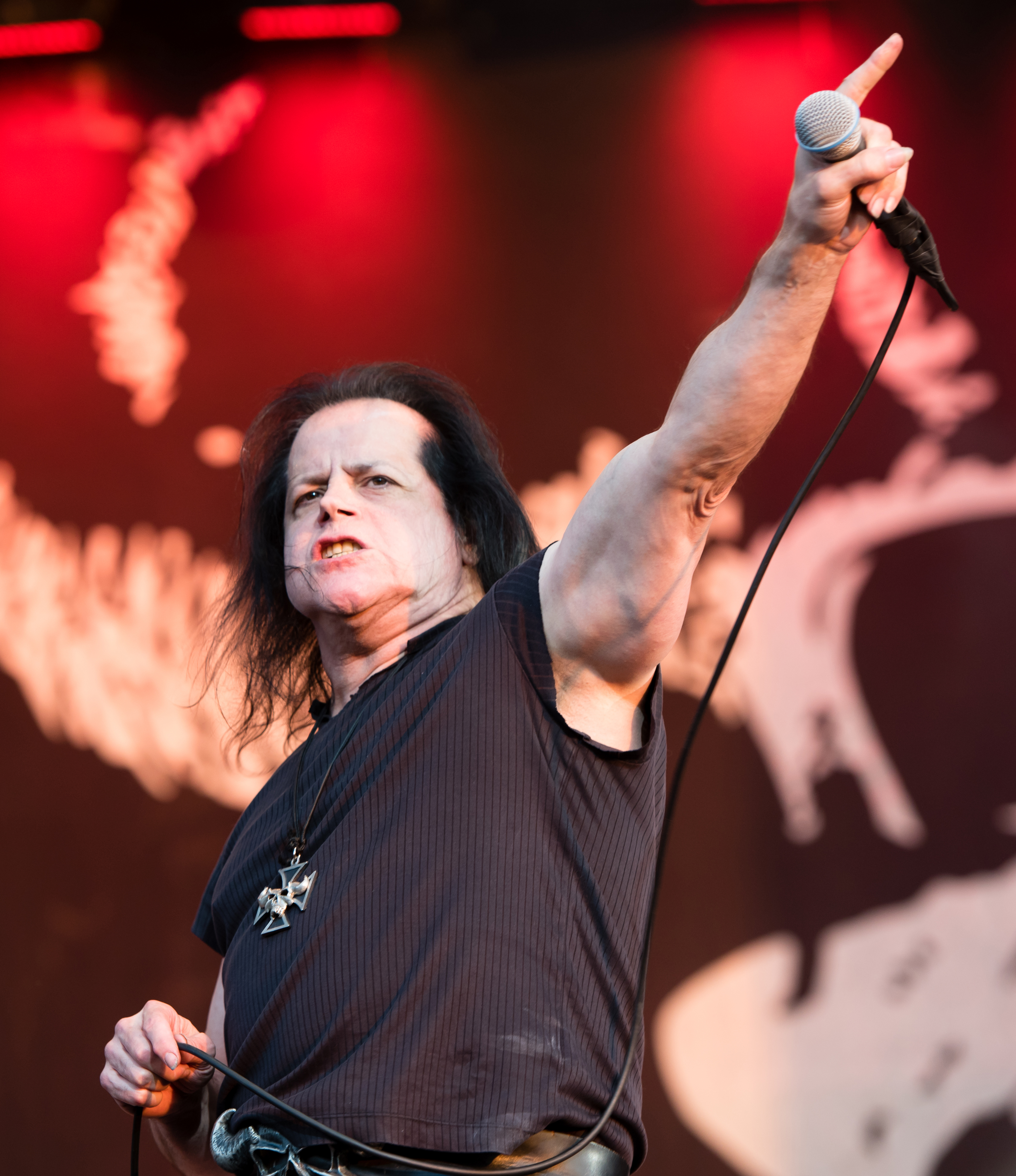
- Frontman Glenn Danzig
- Studio albums: 12
- Extended plays: 2
- Live albums: 1
- Compilation albums: 1
- Singles: 28

This is a comprehensive discography of Danzig, an American heavy metal band, started in 1987 by former Misfits and Samhain vocalist Glenn Danzig. The band has released eleven studio albums, one live album, one compilation album, two EPs and twenty-four singles.

== History ==
Danzig traces its beginnings back to July 14, 1986, when Samhain performed at The Ritz in New York City. In attendance was Rick Rubin, who was scouting for potential bands to sign to his record label, Def Jam. Upon viewing Samhain's performance, Rubin was impressed with Glenn Danzig's powerful stage persona and vocal abilities. He met him after the show and propositioned him. At first, he wished only to sign Danzig, with the intent of making him the vocalist for a hard rock supergroup that Rubin envisioned. However, Danzig refused to sign to Rubin's label without Samhain's bassist, Eerie Von, with whom Danzig had become great friends. Rubin agreed to sign Samhain, and he began making suggestions for the new direction he felt the band should take. Rubin felt the music should be stripped down, and that Danzig's vocal talents should become the focal point for the band.

In 1987, the band evolved into a solid hard rock act, with the addition of John Christ on guitar and Chuck Biscuits on drums. To reflect the change in musical direction, and to avoid having to ever start anew in the event of future lineup changes, Danzig decided to change the name of Samhain to his own surname, Danzig. In 1988, the band issued its eponymous first album on Rubin's then-new label Def American (later renamed to American Recordings). The album featured polished production by Rubin, with heavy, blues-based guitar riffs and Danzig's powerful and melodic vocal performance—a harsh contrast to the gritty, raw-sounding production of Samhain's albums. Two years later, Danzig released their second album Lucifuge.

By 1992, Rubin's involvement with the band had waned and Danzig himself took credit for co-producing the third album, Danzig III: How the Gods Kill. In May 1993, the band released the Thrall-Demonsweatlive EP, which contained several live tracks from the band's 1992 Halloween show, as well as three new studio tracks. The EP provided a hit for the band when the live version of "Mother" (a song from the first Danzig album) became popular on hard rock radio stations. A new version of the "Mother" music video was created using live footage, and the video became a hit on MTV as well, pushing Danzig into the mainstream. After an October 4, 1994 show in the Whisky a Go Go in Los Angeles, the band received two gold awards for an excess of 500,000 units sold both for their debut album and Thrall-Demonsweatlive.

In the fall of 1994, Danzig issued their fourth album, which was also successful and spawned the singles "Until You Call on the Dark" and "Cantspeak". However, shortly before the release of that album, Biscuits left the band and was replaced by future Queens of the Stone Age drummer Joey Castillo.

In 1995, Danzig began to fall apart when Christ and Eerie Von decided to quit the group, leaving Glenn the only remaining original member. Many lineup changes happened since and Danzig released six more albums: Blackacidevil (1996), Satan's Child (1999), I Luciferi (2002), Circle of Snakes (2004) and Deth Red Sabaoth (2010). As of February 2014, Danzig is working on a new album.

Danzig also recorded the song "Black Hell" for the soundtrack to the 2011 film The Hangover Part II.

Danzig's commented on record singles and the band's approach to releasing singles in America: "Singles? We don't do that in America. Maybe there will be for the European market. In America only people like Madonna and N'Sync record singles."

== Albums ==
=== Studio albums ===
Year	Album details	Chart positions					
Year	Album details	US	AUS	AUT	FIN	SWE	SWI
1988	Danzig: Released: August 30, 1988; Label: Def American; Formats: CD, LP, CS, DD	125	—	—	4	—	—
1990	Danzig II: Lucifuge: Released: June 26, 1990; Label: Def American; Formats: CD, LP, CS, DD	74	—	—	5	—	—
1992	Danzig III: How the Gods Kill: Released: July 14, 1992; Label: Def American; Formats: CD, LP, CS, DD	24	—	39	7	—	29
1994	Danzig 4: Released: October 4, 1994; Label: American; Formats: CD, LP, CS, DD	29	95	—	8	36	—
1996	Blackacidevil: Released: October 29, 1996; Label: Hollywood; Formats: CD, CS, DD	41	—	—	23	49	—
1999	6:66 Satan's Child: Released: November 2, 1999; Label: E-Magine; Formats: CD, DD	149	—	—	32	59	—
2002	I Luciferi: Released: May 21, 2002; Label: Spitfire; Formats: CD, DD	158	—	—	—	33	—
2004	Circle of Snakes: Released: August 31, 2004; Label: Evilive; Formats: CD, LP, DD	183	—	—	—	18	—
2010	Deth Red Sabaoth: Released: June 22, 2010; Label: Evilive/The End; Formats: CD, LP, DD	35	—	75	26	36	—
2015	Skeletons: Released: November 27, 2015; Label: Evilive/Nuclear Blast; Formats: CD, LP, DD	198	—	—	—	—	—
2017	Black Laden Crown: Released: May 26, 2017; Label: Evilive/Nuclear Blast; Formats: CD, LP, DD	97	—	42	35	—	97
2020	Danzig Sings Elvis: Released: April 24, 2020; Label: Cleopatra; Formats: CD, LP, DD	192	—	—	—	—	—
"—" denotes a release that did not chart.

- The * marks indicate all sales from June 2007. Danzig and Danzig II: Lucifuge sales are only from May 1991 until June 2007.

=== Live albums ===
Year	Title
2001	Live on the Black Hand Side: Released: May 8, 2001; Label: Evilive; Formats: CD, DD

=== Compilation albums ===
Year	Title	Chart positions
Year	Title	US
2007	The Lost Tracks of Danzig: Released: July 10, 2007; Label: Megaforce; Formats: CD, DD	164

=== Extended plays ===
Year	Album details	Chart positions
Year	Album details	US
1993	Thrall-Demonsweatlive: Released: May 25, 1993; Label: Def American; Formats: CD, CS, DD	54
1996	Sacrifice: Released: December 17, 1996; Label: Hollywood; Formats: CD, DD	—
"—" denotes a release that did not chart.

== Singles ==
Year	Title	Chart positions				Album
Year	Title	US	US Mod.	US Main.	UK	Album
1988	"Mother"	—	—	—	—	Danzig
1990	"Her Black Wings"	—	—	—	—	Danzig II: Lucifuge
1990	"Killer Wolf"	—	—	—	—	Danzig II: Lucifuge
1992	"Dirty Black Summer"	—	—	—	82	Danzig III: How the Gods Kill
1992	"How the Gods Kill"	—	—	—	—	Danzig III: How the Gods Kill
1993	"It's Coming Down"	—	—	—	—	Thrall-Demonsweatlive
1993	"Mother '93"	43	—	17	62	Thrall-Demonsweatlive
1994	"Until You Call on the Dark"	—	—	—	—	Danzig 4p
1994	"Cantspeak"	—	40	—	—	Danzig 4p
1994	"Brand New God"	—	—	—	—	Danzig 4p
1995	"I Don't Mind the Pain"	—	—	—	—	Danzig 4p
1996	"7th House"	—	—	—	—	Blackacidevil
1996	"Sacrifice"	—	—	—	—	Blackacidevil
1997	"Serpentia"	—	—	—	—	Blackacidevil
2000	"Unspeakable"	—	—	—	—	6:66 Satan's Child
2002	"Wicked Pussycat"	—	—	—	—	I Luciferi
2010	"On a Wicked Night"	—	—	—	—	Deth Red Sabaoth
2011	"Ju Ju Bone"	—	—	—	—	Deth Red Sabaoth
2015	"Devil's Angels"	—	—	—	—	Skeletons
2017	"Last Ride"	—	—	—	—	Black Laden Crown
2017	"Devil on Hwy 9"	—	—	—	—	Black Laden Crown
"—" denotes a release that did not chart.

== Bibliography ==
- Flick, Larry (November 5, 1994). "R&R Expanding for Publishers: Execs Help Shape Young Writers, Producers". Billboard. Vol. 106, no. 45. New York. p. 18. ISSN 0006-2510.
