= Sell Out =

Selling out is the compromising of principles in exchange for success.

Sell Out may refer to:

- Sell Out!, a 2008 Malaysian film
- Sell Out (Halfcocked album), 1998
- The Who Sell Out, a 1967 album by the Who
- "Sell Out" (Reel Big Fish song), 1996
- "Sell Out" (Marshmello and Svdden Death song), 2019
- Sell Out, a 1996 album by Dia Psalma
- $ell Out, a 1999 album by Pist.On

== See also ==
- The Sellout (disambiguation)
- Selling Out (disambiguation)
- Sold Out (disambiguation)
