= Heaven Is Gone =

Studio album by Seventh Void
- Released: April 21, 2009
- Genre: Doom metal, heavy metal, stoner rock
- Length: 42:25
- Label: Big Vin Records
- Producer: Vinnie Paul

Reissue cover

Professional ratings
Review scores
Source	Rating
Blogcritics	3.5/5 stars
Chronicles of Chaos	(8.5/10)
Type 3 Media	6.5/10 stars

Heaven Is Gone is the first studio album by American heavy metal band Seventh Void.

It sold around 1,800 copies in the United States in its first week of release, peaking at number 21 on the Billboard Top Heatseekers chart. A music video was released for "Heaven Is Gone". Later, band friend Slitzy created a music video for "Last Walk in the Light" featuring live footage of the band. When the album was re-released through Napalm Records in 2010 it received a new cover artwork.

== Track listing ==
All tracks written by Matt Brown and Kenny Hickey

1. "Closing In" – 3:59
2. "Heaven Is Gone" – 4:37
3. "The End of All Time" – 4:49
4. "Broken Sky" – 3:13
5. "Killing You Slow" – 4:58
6. "Descent" – 4:10
7. "Shadow on Me" – 4:09
8. "Drown Inside" – 3:32
9. "Death of a Junkie" – 5:41
10. "Last Walk in the Light" – 3:11

== Personnel ==
- Kenny Hickey – vocals, lead guitar
- Hank Hell – bass
- Johnny Kelly – drums

Former members

- Matt Brown – guitar, production, engineering
