= Selling Out (disambiguation) =

Selling out is the act of compromising one's perceived principles for economic gain.

Selling Out may also refer to:

- Selling Out (film), a 1972 documentary film
- "Selling Out" (Frasier), the ninth episode from the first season of American sitcom Frasier
- "Selling Out" (SpongeBob SquarePants), a 2005 SpongeBob SquarePants episode

== See also ==
- Sell Out (disambiguation)
- The Sellout (disambiguation)
- Co-optation
- Compromise, a concept of finding agreement through communication, through a mutual acceptance of terms—often involving variations from an original goal or desire
- Commercialization, the process or cycle of introducing a new product into the market
