= Edge of Existence =

Edge of Existence may refer to:

- Edge of Existence, a 2019 album by Silvertomb
- EDGE of Existence programme, a research and conservation initiative
