= Charlee Johnson =

American musician and songwriter

Charlee Johnson (also Charlee Johnsson) is an American drummer, guitarist and songwriter, originally from San Bernardino, California. Johnson was a founding member and chief songwriter of Utah punk band Deviance/3½ Girls. The band relocated to Boston, Massachusetts and signed with Curve of the Earth Records for their sole EP, "Rule". Johnson then left to form Halfcocked (then known as Half Cocked) with guitarist Tommy O'Neil, bassist/backing vocalist Jhen Kobran and lead vocalist Sarah Reitkopp, later adding guitarist Johnny Rock Heatley who guested on debut album Sell Out and joined as a full member with second album Occupation: Rock Star. Halfcocked relocated to Los Angeles and signed with DreamWorks in early 2000 by Powerman 5000 frontman Spider One, released final album The Last Star in 2001 (produced by Ulrich Wild), then folded after a brief tour. Johnson went on to join childhood hero Danzig for a brief stint as "Charlee X", before joining award-winning Nirvana tribute band, Pennyroyal.
