= Number One (Pist.On album) =

- Cover of the Atlantic Records version of Number One, released in 1997

Studio album by Pist.On
- Released: October 1, 1996 (United States); November 4, 1996 (Europe); June 24, 1997 (Atlantic reissue)
- Studio: Systems Two Recording, Brooklyn, New York
- Genre: Gothic metal; alternative metal
- Length: 45:32
- Label: Fierce
- Producer: Josh Silver

Pist.On chronology
Number One (1996)	$ell.Out (1999)

Original cover

Professional ratings
Review scores
Source	Rating
AllMusic	3/5 stars

Number One is the debut album by American heavy metal band Pist.On (or Piston). It was first released in 1996 by Fierce Recordings/Futurist Label Group, before being repackaged and re-released by Atlantic Records on June 24, 1997.

== Name change ==
Another notable change, between the original album and the Atlantic version, is the spelling of the band's name, from Pist*On to simply Piston. The issue of the band having "sold out" to Atlantic became the focal point of their next album, titled $ell.Out.

== Track listing ==
All songs written by Henry Font, except "Shoplifters of the World Unite" (Morrissey/Marr, c. 1987)

1. "Parole" – 3:43
2. "Turbulent" – 3:37
3. "Grey Flap" – 3:57
4. "Shoplifters of the World Unite" (The Smiths cover) – 2:29
5. "I Am No One" – 5:19
6. "Eight Sides" – 3:50
7. "I'm Afraid of Life" – 4:39
8. "Electra Complex" – 2:56
9. "Down & Out" – 3:42
10. "Mix Me with Blood" – 2:52
11. "My Feet" – 3:27
12. "Exit Wound" – 4:56

== Personnel ==
=== Original version ===
- Henry Font – lead & backing vocals, rhythm guitar
- Paul Poulos – lead guitar & backing vocals
- Val Ium – bass guitar, backing vocals, and sarcasm
- Danny Jam Kavadlo – drums & percussion
- Recorded at Systems Two Recording, Brooklyn, NY
- Engineered by Michael Marciano
- Produced by Josh Silver
- Mastered by Rick Essig at Frankford/Wayne, NY

=== Atlantic Records version ===
The band signed with Atlantic Records in 1996 and the new label re-released Number One in 1997. The Atlantic version of contained new artwork and a reworked lineup:

- Henry Font – lead vocals & rhythm guitars
- Burton Gans* – lead guitar
- Val Ium – bass guitar, backing vocals & cerebral torture
- Jeff McManus* – drums, percussion & gambling problems

However, the recording itself remained the same, so the liner notes included the following message:

"Note: We are forced to mention (for legal purposes), that all lead guitars and backing vocals (on 'I Am No One'), on this recording, were played by Paul Poulos and drums & percussion played by Danny 'Jam' Kavadlo."
