= The Last Star =

2001 studio album by Halfcocked

Studio album by Halfcocked
- Released: 2001
- Genre: Hard rock
- Label: Megatronic/DreamWorks
- Producer: Ulrich Wild

Halfcocked chronology
Occupation: Rock Star (2000)	The Last Star (2001)

Professional ratings
Review scores
Source	Rating
Allmusic	3/5 stars

The Last Star is the third album to be released by American hard rock band Halfcocked, the band's major label debut. The album was released in 2001 by the DreamWorks imprint Megatronic. It features new versions of songs from the first two albums, and some new material. It was recorded at Larrabee East studio in North Hollywood and produced by Ulrich Wild, known for his work with bands like Buckcherry and Deftones. "Always" appears in the 2001 video game Portal Runner as the title and main menu background music.

== Track listing ==
1. "I Lied" – 4:10 (Johnny Heatley, Sarah Reitkopp)
2. "Always" – 3:23 (Heatley, Reitkopp)
3. "Drive Away" – 3:10 (Heatley, Reitkopp)
4. "All By Myself" – 2:44 (Jhen Kobran, Reitkopp)
5. "Held Under" – 2:06 (Kobran, Reitkopp)
6. "Over" – 3:06 (Charlee Johnson, Reitkopp)
7. "Gun for Hire" – 3:02 (Heatley, Reitkopp)
8. "Sell Out" – 3:53 (Heatley, Reitkopp)
9. "Thanks for the Ride" – 2:34 (Johnson, Reitkopp)
10. "Sober" – 4:06 (Heatley, Reitkopp)
11. "Touch Down" – 2:39 (Kobran, Reitkopp)
12. "Devil Shoes" – 2:23 (Johnson, Reitkopp)
13. "Glitter" – 3:44 (Heatley, Reitkopp)

== Personnel ==
- Sarah Reitkopp : Singer
- Tommy O'Neil : Guitar
- Johnny Rock Heatley : Guitar
- Jhen Kobran : Bass, backing vocals
- Charlee Johnson : Drums
- Jaime Richter : Guitar, backing vocals
