= Occupation: Rock Star =

Studio album by Halfcocked
- Released: 2000
- Genre: Hard rock
- Label: Curve of the Earth

Halfcocked chronology
Sell Out (1998)	Occupation: Rock Star (2000)	The Last Star (2001)

Professional ratings
Review scores
Source	Rating
Allmusic	2.5/5 stars

Occupation: Rock Star is the second release by Boston hard rock band Halfcocked. It was released by Curve of the Earth in April 2000. The album won a Boston Music Award (BMA) for Outstanding Debut Album (Indie Label).

== Track listing ==
1. "Wrecking Ball" – 3:18 (Charlee Johnson, Tommy O'Neil, Sarah Reitkopp)
2. "I Lied" – 3:54 (Johnny Heatley, Reikopp)
3. "Devil Shoes" – 2:22 (Johnson, Reitkopp)
4. "All by Myself" – 3:00 (Jhen Kobran, Reitkopp)
5. "Glitter" – 3:43 (Johnson, Reitkopp)
6. "Drive Away" – 3:09 (Heatley, Reikopp)
7. "Comes Down" – 3:09 (Kobran, Reitkopp)
8. "Sell Out" – 3:50 (Heatley, Reikopp)
9. "V.I.P." – 4:22 (O'Neil, Reitkopp)
10. "Breakdown" – 4:00 (Johnson, Reitkopp)
11. "I Lied" (Arena edit) – 6:02 (Heatley, Reikopp)

== Personnel ==
- Sarah Reitkopp : Singer
- Tommy O'Neil : Guitar
- Johnny Rock Heatley : Guitar
- Jhen Kobran : Bass, backing vocals
- Charlee Johnson : Drums
- Jim Healey, guest vocals
