= Big Vin Records =

American record label

- Founded: 2006
- Founder: Vinnie Paul Abbott
- Distributor: Fontana Records
- Genre: Heavy metal
- Country of origin: U.S.
- Location: Arlington, Texas, U.S.
- Official website: bigvinrecords.com

Big Vin Records was an American record label based in Arlington, Texas. The company was formed in February 2006 by former Pantera, Damageplan and Hellyeah drummer Vinnie Paul Abbott and had a distribution deal with Fontana Records, which in turn is owned by Universal Music Group.

Seventh Void, the Hillbilly Orchestra, Fountainhead, and Mark "The Chinaman" Britten are among the artists signed to the label.

== Releases ==
=== Albums ===
- Rebel Meets Rebel by David Allan Coe and Cowboys from Hell (2006)
- Heaven Is Gone by Seventh Void (2009)
- Underkill by Fountainhead (2015)

=== DVDs ===
- Dimevision, Volume 1 (2006)

Abbott stated that he planned to preserve his brother's legacy and continue to release his recorded material. DimeVision Vol. 2, along with an official photo book for Dimebag, was released in 2017, substantially delayed from its initial planned release date of 2008.

== Artists ==
- Hillbilly Orchestra
- Seventh Void
- Mark "The Chinaman" Britten
