= Seventh Void =

American doom metal band

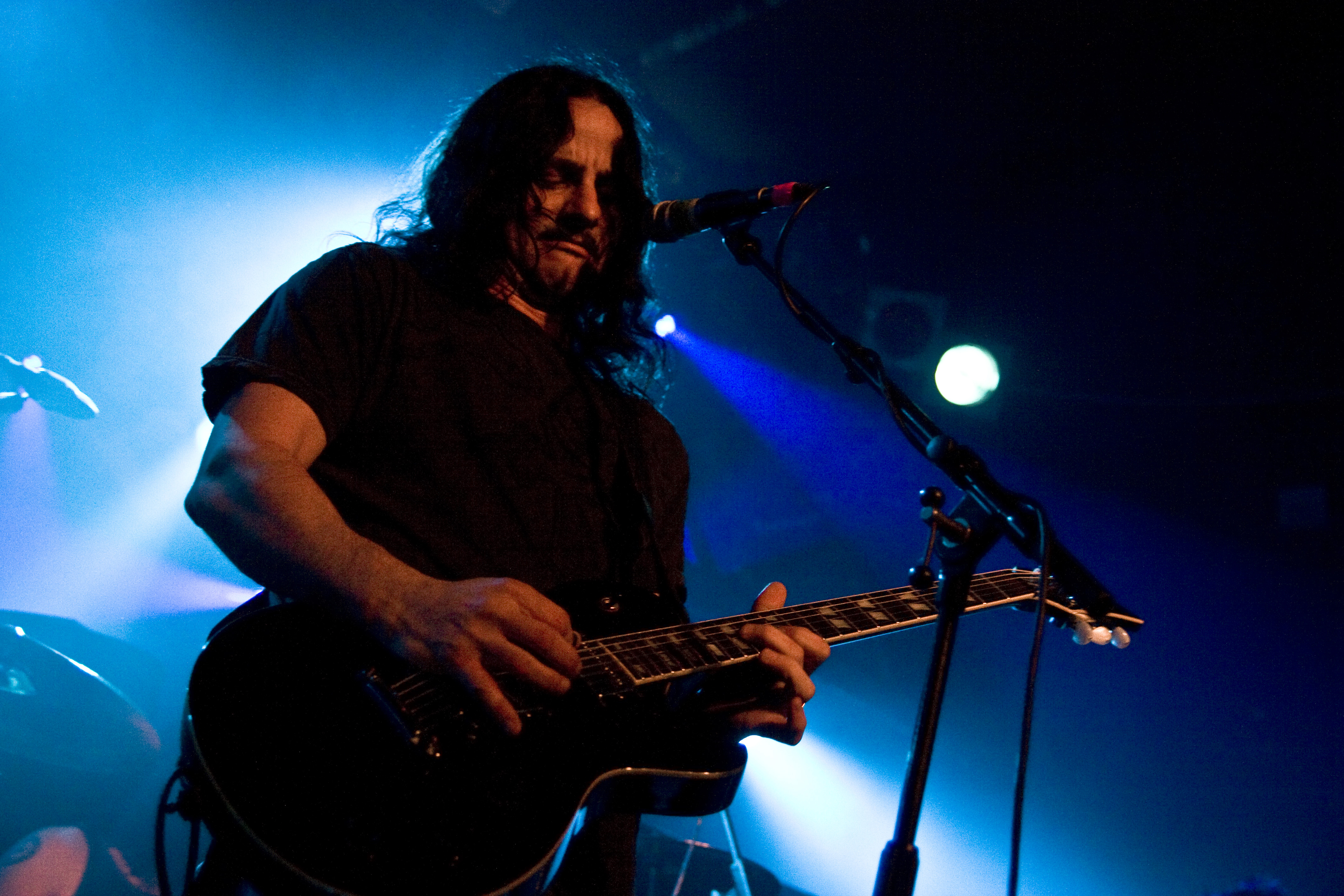
- Frontman Kenny Hickey in 2010

Background information
- Origin: Brooklyn, New York, U.S.
- Genres: Doom metal, stoner metal
- Years active: 2003–2017
- Label: Big Vin Records
- Spinoffs: Silvertomb
- Members: Kenny Hickey; Hank Hell (Henry Belfort); Johnny Kelly
- Past members: Matt Brown

Seventh Void was an American doom metal band composed of vocalist/guitarist Kenny Hickey and drummer Johnny Kelly (both formerly of Type O Negative), guitarist Matt Brown (formerly of Uranium 235 and A Pale Horse Named Death), as well as bassist Hank Hell (Inhuman).

== History ==
Originally conceived in 2003 by Kenny and Johnny, the band's personnel was not solidified until 2005 and songwriting began in earnest. The band's name is lifted from a line in Dante's Inferno.

The band's debut album, Heaven Is Gone, was released in April 2009 in North America on Vinnie Paul's record label Big Vin Records, and in November 2010 in Europe and the UK on Napalm Records. Matt Brown left the band in October 2011, for reasons unknown.

On March 1, 2015, via Twitter, the band indicated that many songs had been written and the album was nearer to completion. When asked about the new album's progress during an interview with Metalireland, Johnny Kelly reported that it had indeed been written and speculated that it would likely see a released in late 2017 or 2018. He confirmed ex-Agnostic Front member Joseph James as the replacement guitarist and stated that the band had also recruited a keyboardist, suggesting a return to sounds reminiscent of his and Hickey's previous band, Type O Negative. Because of this discernible change in the band's sound, Kelly also stated that it would likely prompt a name change for the band, though the members were currently undecided.

In 2017, it was announced the band ended, and the members started a new project called Silvertomb.

== Band members ==
- Kenny Hickey – lead vocals, lead guitar (2003–2017)
- Hank Hell – bass guitar (2003–2017)
- Johnny Kelly – drums (2003–2017)
- Joseph James – rhythm guitar (2015–2017)

Former

- Matt Brown – rhythm guitar, production, engineering (2003–2011)

== Discography ==
- Heaven Is Gone (2009)
