= Pist.On =

American heavy metal band

- L–R: Jeff McManus, Val Ium, Burton Gans and Henry Font (1997)

Background information
- Origin: Staten Island, New York, U.S.
- Genres: Alternative metal, gothic metal
- Years active: 1993–2001, 2015–present
- Labels: Mayhem/Fierce, Atlantic
- Members: Henry Font; Burton Gans; Jack Hanley; Jeff McManus
- Past members: Val Ium; Paul Poulos; Danny Kavadlo; Johnny Kelly
- Website: pist-on.com

Pist.On (also spelled Pist*On, Pist-On, Pist•On, PistOn, and Piston) is an American alternative metal band from Staten Island, New York. They released two albums in the 1990s before splitting up in 2001. In 2015, the band announced a reunion.

== History ==
=== Original members ===
Formed around the core duo of Henry Font (vocals, guitars) and Val.Ium (bass, backing vocals), the band released two demos in the early 1990s, the second of which, Urine the Money, was produced by Josh Silver of Type O Negative. The band's friendship with Type O Negative (also based out of Brooklyn) brought them both help and scorn in subsequent years.

In 1996 the band, now rounded out by Paul Poulos (guitars, backing vocals) and Danny "Jam" Kavadlo (drums), released their first full-length album, Number One, to critical acclaim in both the United States and Europe. Subsequent tours with Type O Negative and Marilyn Manson helped improve the band's notoriety. Within a year, they moved from the independent Mayhem/Fierce record label to a major label, Atlantic Records. Also around this time, Poulos and Kavadlo both left the band.

=== Second lineup ===
New members Burton Gans (guitars) and Jeff McManus (drums) joined in time to see an Atlantic rerelease of Number One with new photos, artwork, and, perhaps most obvious of all, spelling; the band's name shifted from "Pist.On" to the "friendlier" spelling "PistOn". The removal of the "." led to criticism that the band had "sold out". Under the guise of their new name and label, the band again toured exhaustively. During this time, drummer Jeff McManus was forced into a brief respite for medical reasons, with Johnny Kelly of Type O Negative filling in.

=== 1996–1997 ===
Pist.on's debut album, successful on its face, had been picked up and rereleased by a major label, the band had deep friendships and histories with well-known acts such as Type O Negative, Marilyn Manson, the Misfits, and Queensrÿche, and had energetic new blood in the form of two members. However, the promises and possibilities of this era never panned out, and after a handful of tours and negative reviews, the band was unceremoniously dropped by Atlantic.

=== Second release ===
1999 saw the release of the band's second album, $ell Out, again through Mayhem Records. The record was described as rife with crooked and spiteful poking at the music industry, the band's former label, the press, and the band itself. The album met with lukewarm reviews and sales, and breakup rumors swirled.

=== Breakup ===
After the band's second release, drummer Jeff McManus departed from the band, returning briefly to record a 3-song independent Saves EP in the spring of 2001. Despite the optimism brought on by Saves, the core duo of Pist.On broke apart in late August 2001 when bassist Val Ium decided to leave the band as well. Though not officially broken up at the time, Pist.On did not release any new material as a band for over two decades, although several band members including Henry Font and Jeff McManus released recordings independently in the intervening years.

=== Reunion ===
As of March 2015, Pist.On has reformed and they are working on new material.

In early October 2017, Pist.On announced their formal reformation and a UK Tour with seven dates in June 2018

Pist.On released an EP, Cold World EP, on March 25, 2022, making it the band's first new studio recording since 2001. It would later be re-released as Cold World+, containing the tracks of the original EP, the Saves EP and several unreleased demos from 2000.

== Members ==
=== Current members ===
- Henry Font – vocals, guitars (1993–2001, 2015–present)
- Burton Gans – guitars (1996–2001, 2015–present)
- Jeff McManus – drums (1996–2001, 2015–present)
- Jack Hanley – bass (2015–present)

=== Former members ===
- Val Ium – bass, backing vocals (1993–2001)
- Danny "Jam" Kavadlo – drums (1993–1996)
- Paul Poulos – guitar, backing vocals (1993–1996)

=== Touring members ===
- Johnny Kelly – drums

== Discography ==
The band released their Saves EP in 2001, shortly before taking an extended hiatus.

Studio albums

- Number One (1996)
- $ell Out (1999)
- Cold World + (2022)

EPs

- Saves (2001)
- Cold World EP (2022)

Demos

- First Demo Tape (1993)
- Urine the Money (1993)

=== Solo projects in the 2000s ===
- Henry Font
  - "SumMerFlu"
- Jeff McManus
  - "Weekends with Dan" (released the single Anna Rexia in 2006 which received acclaim in several punk rock publications)
- Burton Gans
  - "American Popular"
  - "The Deadlyz" (released self-titled debut album in 2009, followed up by second studio album Fabulous Disaster in 2011)
