= Sell Out (Halfcocked album) =

Studio album by Halfcocked
- Released: January 19, 1998
- Genre: Hard rock
- Label: Curve of the Earth

Halfcocked chronology
Sell Out (1998)	Occupation: Rock Star (2000)

Professional ratings
Review scores
Source	Rating
Allmusic	link

Sell Out is the first release by Boston hard rock band Halfcocked.

== Track listing ==
1. "Crash" – 3:24 (Tommy O'Neil)
2. "Holly Wood" – (Charlee Johnson)
3. "Return of the Living Dead" – (Johnson)
4. "Superstar" – (Johnson)
5. "Whole in the World (Thanks for the Ride)" – (Johnson)
6. "Back Breaks" – (Sarah Reitkopp)
7. "Missing" – (Jhen Kobran)
8. "Less Vegas" – (O'Neil)
9. "Not Dead Yet" – (Johnson)
10. "Percocet (Kerosene)" – (Kobran)
11. "Heavy" – (Johnson)
12. "Ghost Bones" – (Johnson, O'Neil)

== Personnel ==
- Sarah Reitkopp : Singer
- Tommy O'Neil : Guitar
- Johnny Rock Heatley : Guest Guitar
- Jhen Kobran : Bass, backing vocals
- Charlee Johnson : Drums
- Janet Egan, guest guitarist
