= Silvertomb =

American doom metal band

Background information
- Origin: Brooklyn, New York, U.S.
- Genres: Doom metal, heavy metal
- Years active: 2017–present
- Label: Long Branch
- Members: Kenny Hickey; Hank Hell (Henry Belfor); Johnny Kelly; Joseph James; Aaron Joos
- Website: silvertomb.bandcamp.com

Silvertomb is an American doom metal band composed of Type O Negative members Kenny Hickey and Johnny Kelly, as well as Hank Hell of Inhuman, Joseph James of Agnostic Front and Aaron Joos of Empyreon. Following the dissolution of Hickey's previous band Seventh Void in 2017, Silvertomb was formed.

The band has played various songs live since their initial formation, though it was not until November 1, 2019, that their first full-length album, Edge of Existence, was released.

== Band members ==
- Kenny Hickey – lead vocals, lead guitar
- Hank Hell – bass guitar
- Johnny Kelly – drums
- Joseph James – guitar
- Aaron Joos – keyboards and guitars

== Discography ==
- Edge of Existence (2019)
- The Interpretation of Nightmares (2026)
