= Sold Out (disambiguation) =

Sold Out may refer to:

- The act of selling out, the compromising of one's integrity, morality and principles in exchange for money, success or other personal gain
- Sold Out Sales & Marketing, a low-cost software distributor owned by Mastertronic
- Sold Out: A Threevening with Kevin Smith, 2008
- Sold Out (Squirrel Nut Zippers album), 1997
- Sold Out (The Kingston Trio album), 1960
- Sold Out (DJ Paypal album), 2015
- Sold Out (Loboda album), 2020
- Sold Out (In Stereo), a 2002 live album by Jason Mraz
- "Sold Out," a song by Sleater-Kinney from their 1995 album Sleater-Kinney
- "Sold Out", a song by Hardy from his 2023 album The Mockingbird & the Crow
- Sold Out, a 1997 band simulation video game featuring music composed by Jeff Pfeifer and Rob Pfeifer
- Sold Out (book) (2015) non-fiction by Michelle Malkin and John Miano, displacement of white-collar professionals by temporary-foreign worker programs
