= I Luciferi =

Danzig 777: I Luciferi

Studio album by Danzig
- Released: May 21, 2002
- Recorded: June 2001–January 2002
- Studios: Grandmaster; Rumbo; Glenwood Place; The Hook; Hollywood Sound
- Genre: Heavy metal
- Length: 54:28
- Label: Evilive/Spitfire
- Producer: Glenn Danzig

Danzig chronology
Live on the Black Hand Side (2001)	Danzig 777: I Luciferi (2002)	Circle of Snakes (2004)

Singles from I Luciferi
- 1. "Wicked Pussycat" Released: 2002

Professional ratings
Review scores
Source	Rating
Allmusic	3/5 stars
Blistering	(favorable)
Brave Words	7/10 stars
College Music Journal	(favorable)
Exclaim!	(favorable)
LA Weekly	(favorable)
Punknews.org	4.5/5 stars
Rock Hard	7/10 stars

Danzig 777: I Luciferi (/ˌiː ˌluːsɪˈfɛraɪ/) is the seventh studio album by American heavy metal band Danzig. It was released on May 21, 2002 by Glenn Danzig's Evilive label and distributed by Spitfire Records. Danzig stated that this album was the last in a series of seven numbered albums, each with its own general concept.

Over the months following the tour for this album, each of the other band members left to pursue other projects. Most notably, Joey Castillo joined Queens of the Stone Age; he appeared on Danzig's eleventh studio album Black Laden Crown (2017), but did not officially rejoin Danzig.

== Music and recording ==
The song "Angel Blake" is named after the witch in the film The Blood on Satan's Claw.

The track "Wicked Pussycat" served as the album's first single.

The original track listing, as reported by KNAC on December 22, 2001, featured several tracks that did not appear on the final album. These included the songs "Dying Seraph", "Soul Eater", and "Malefical Bride of Hell", all of which were released in 2007 on The Lost Tracks of Danzig, with "Malefical Bride of Hell" having its title shortened to "Malefical". An additional track titled "Dark Secret Side" has never been released.

== Album title ==
In a 2002 interview with Juliya Chernetsky on Fuse TV's Uranium show, Glenn Danzig said that the pronunciation of the album title is /ˌiː luːsɪˈfɛraɪ/ EE-loo-si-FERR-eye. This corresponds to Danzig's pronunciation of the word in the chorus of the title track. Early press releases for the album reveal that its working title was Danzig 7: Kiss the Skull.

== Artwork and packaging ==
The CD booklet contains a quotation from Celsus, a second-century AD opponent of Christianity: "They worship neither a god nor even a demon, but a dead man!"

Porn star Devon appears in the CD booklet and on the back of the CD jacket.

The lyric sheet for the song "Black Mass" contains a misprint: "Asan un Nefer". The correct lyric is "Asar-un-Nefer" ("Myself Made Perfect"), an epithet of the Egyptian god Osiris used especially in the Thelemic "Bornless Ritual". Earlier in the song, Danzig's lyrics refer to "the Bornless One".

The lyrics for "Wicked Pussycat" contain an omission. The correct missing lyric is "five-pointed star-tail": as the lyric is repeated at one point in the video for the song, the camera focuses on the tail/chain of a girl's cat costume; at the end of the chain is a pentagram.

== Reception ==
- Allmusic – "Uneven as I Luciferi is, it's a quite listenable and welcome return to truly metallic form for Glenn Danzig...Sure, his best years are most likely behind him at this point, but I Luciferi proves that this old snake still has some venom left in his fangs."
- Punknews.org – "This album is extremely dark and heavy, as you might expect...The best thing about this album is that it is devoid of filler, the hard smacks just keep coming and don't stop 'till the end."
- LA Weekly – "Controlled, relentless darkness and passion. Great song after great song. Forget the muscles and skulls, this is hard-rock music."
- Blistering – "The effect-laden focus of the previous two albums is long gone, with only hints of the old industrial sound remaining...There isn’t a weak moment on the album. This one has got it all. If you have left the Danzig circle, it’s time to return."

== Music videos ==
Music videos were released for the songs "Kiss the Skull" and "Wicked Pussycat".

The video for "Kiss the Skull" was directed by Thomas Mignone, who has also directed live action videos for Verotik. The "devil fetus" that appears in the video was designed by Glenn Danzig.

== Track listing ==
1. "Unendlich" – 1:51
2. "Black Mass" – 4:58
3. "Wicked Pussycat" – 4:03
4. "God of Light" – 3:39
5. "Liberskull" – 5:45
6. "Dead Inside" – 5:16
7. "Kiss the Skull" – 4:11
8. "I Luciferi" – 3:15
9. "Naked Witch" – 3:55
10. "Angel Blake" – 3:35
11. "The Coldest Sun" – 3:59
12. "Halo Goddess Bone" – 4:29
13. "Without Light, I Am" – 5:32

All songs written by Glenn Danzig

== Credits ==
- Glenn Danzig – vocals, guitar, keyboards
- Joey Castillo – drums
- Howie Pyro – bass
- Todd Youth – guitar

== Charts ==
Chart (2002)	Peak position
German Albums (Offizielle Top 100)	91
Swedish Albums (Sverigetopplistan)	33
US Billboard 200	158
US Independent Albums (Billboard)	14
