= Halfcocked =

American hard rock band

- Origin: Boston, Massachusetts, United States
- Genres: Hard rock
- Years active: 1997–2002
- Labels: Curve of the Earth, Megatronic/DreamWorks
- Past members: Johnny Heatley; Jhen Kobran; Charlee Johnson; Tommy O'Neil; Sarah Reitkopp

Halfcocked (also known as Half Cocked, Halfc*cked or Half-Cocked) was an American hard rock band. Influenced by 1970s hard rock and punk rock, along with 1980s glam metal, they started out in Boston in 1997 and signed with independent label Curve of the Earth Records. In 1999 the band placed third in the finals of the WBCN Rock & Roll Rumble, being the first "wild card" act to play in the finals. They signed with DreamWorks imprint Megatronic Records (headed by Powerman 5000 frontman Spider One) and moved to Los Angeles in 2000. After numerous delays, they released one final album—The Last Star—before splitting up in 2002.

== Personnel ==
- Sarah Reitkopp : Vocalist
- Jhen Kobran : Bassist/backing vocalist
- Tommy O'Neil : Guitarist
- Johnny Heatley : Guitarist
- Charlee Johnson : Drums

== Discography ==
=== Studio albums ===
- Sell Out (1998)
- Occupation: Rock Star (2000)
- The Last Star (2001)

=== Compilation appearances ===
- Girls! Girls! Girls! (1998, Curve of the Earth) (song: "Whole in the World")
- Benefit for El Chupacabra (1998, Polterchrist) (song: "Ghost Bones")
- Dracula 2000 soundtrack (2000, Sony) (song: "Sober")
- Shrek soundtrack (2001, DreamWorks) (song: "Bad Reputation", the original Joan Jett version is heard in the film)
- WWF Tough Enough (2001, DreamWorks) (song: "Drive Away")
