= Danzig Sings Elvis =

Studio album by Danzig
- Released: April 17, 2020
- Genre: Rock and roll
- Length: 39:21
- Label: Cleopatra

Danzig chronology
Black Laden Crown (2017)	Danzig Sings Elvis (2020)

Professional ratings
Aggregate scores
Source	Rating
Metacritic	60/100
Review scores
Source	Rating
AllMusic	2.5/5 stars
PunkNews	3.5/5 stars
Slant Magazine	2.5/5 stars

Danzig Sings Elvis is the twelfth studio album by American heavy metal band Danzig. It was released on April 17, 2020, through Cleopatra Records. The album consists of cover versions of tracks originally recorded by Elvis Presley. "Always on My Mind" was released as the album's sole single on July 29, 2020. The single was released on 7-inch vinyl as well as via digital and streaming formats and features an alternate vocal version of "Loving Arms" as its B-side.

== Critical reception ==
Danzig Sings Elvis was met with mixed reviews from critics. At Metacritic, which assigns a weighted average rating out of 100 to reviews from mainstream publications, this release received an average score of 60, based on five reviews. In a review for AllMusic' Mark Deming noted "While [Glenn] Danzig doesn't sound exactly bad here, the harder he tries to sound like Presley, the more he misses the target, and the grain of his voice and the occasional moments where he's reaching for notes he doesn't quite have make it clear he shouldn't have waited until he was 64 years old to do this, when his voice isn't nearly as nimble as Presley's in his prime. Also touching on the quality of the vocal delivery, Amanda Petrusich of The New Yorker said " [h]is vocals are pleasantly imperfect—still thick and round, but a little bit frayed at the edges, and not in an especially deliberate way, sometimes Danzig's voice gets a little wobbly, as if it were late at night, and maybe he has been drinking" but went on to praise the structures of the songs: "most of the arrangements are faithful to the originals. Danzig doesn't transform any of these tracks into speed-metal songs or fiddle around with the melodies".

== Track listing ==
No.	Title	Length
1.	"Is It So Strange"	2:32
2.	"One Night"	2:41
3.	"Lonely Blue Boy"	2:18
4.	"First in Line"	3:32
5.	"Baby Let's Play House"	2:35
6.	"Love Me"	3:09
7.	"Pocket Full of Rainbows"	2:55
8.	"Fever"	3:45
9.	"When It Rains, It Really Pours"	1:49
10.	"Always on My Mind"	3:14
11.	"Loving Arms"	3:02
12.	"Like a Baby"	2:36
13.	"The Girl of My Best Friend"	2:51
14.	"Young and Beautiful"	2:22
Total length:		39:21

== Personnel ==
- Glenn Danzig – vocals, guitars, all other instruments
- Tommy Victor – guitar
- Joey Castillo – drums (on "Fever")

== Charts ==
Chart (2020)	Peak position
UK Independent Albums (OCC)	42
US Billboard 200	192
US Independent Albums (Billboard)	25
US Top Album Sales (Billboard)	6
US Top Rock Albums (Billboard)	32
