= Johnny Kelly =

American drummer (born 1968

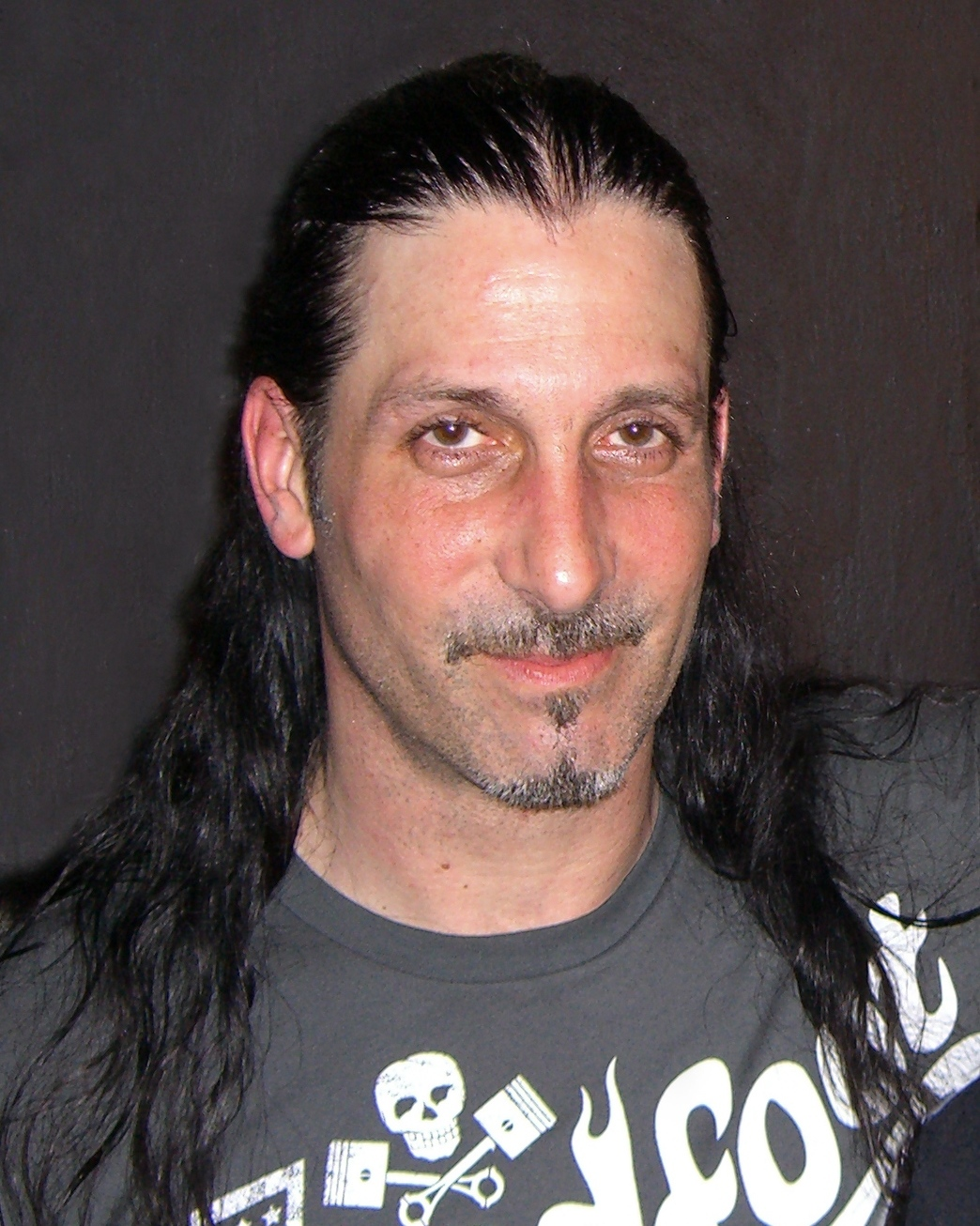
- Kelly in 2014

Background information
- Born: March 9, 1968 (age 58); Brooklyn, New York City, U.S.
- Genres: Gothic metal; doom metal; heavy metal
- Occupation: Drummer
- Years active: 1993–present
- Member of: Silvertomb; Sun Don't Shine; Patriarchs in Black; Kill Devil Hill; Quiet Riot
- Formerly of: Type O Negative; A Pale Horse Named Death; Black Label Society; Danzig; Pist.On; Seventh Void; Seven Witches

Johnny Kelly (born March 9, 1968) is an American musician, best known as the former drummer of the gothic metal band Type O Negative, with whom he played for from 1993 until the death of the band's frontman Peter Steele in 2010. He is currently the drummer for the doom metal band Silvertomb and was the co-founder of the doom metal band Seventh Void. All three bands featured fellow Type O Negative member and close friend Kenny Hickey on guitar. Kelly has been the drummer for Quiet Riot since 2020, succeeding Frankie Banali. He is also an occasional touring drummer for the heavy metal band Danzig and a member of the US metal band Patriarchs in Black.

== Career ==
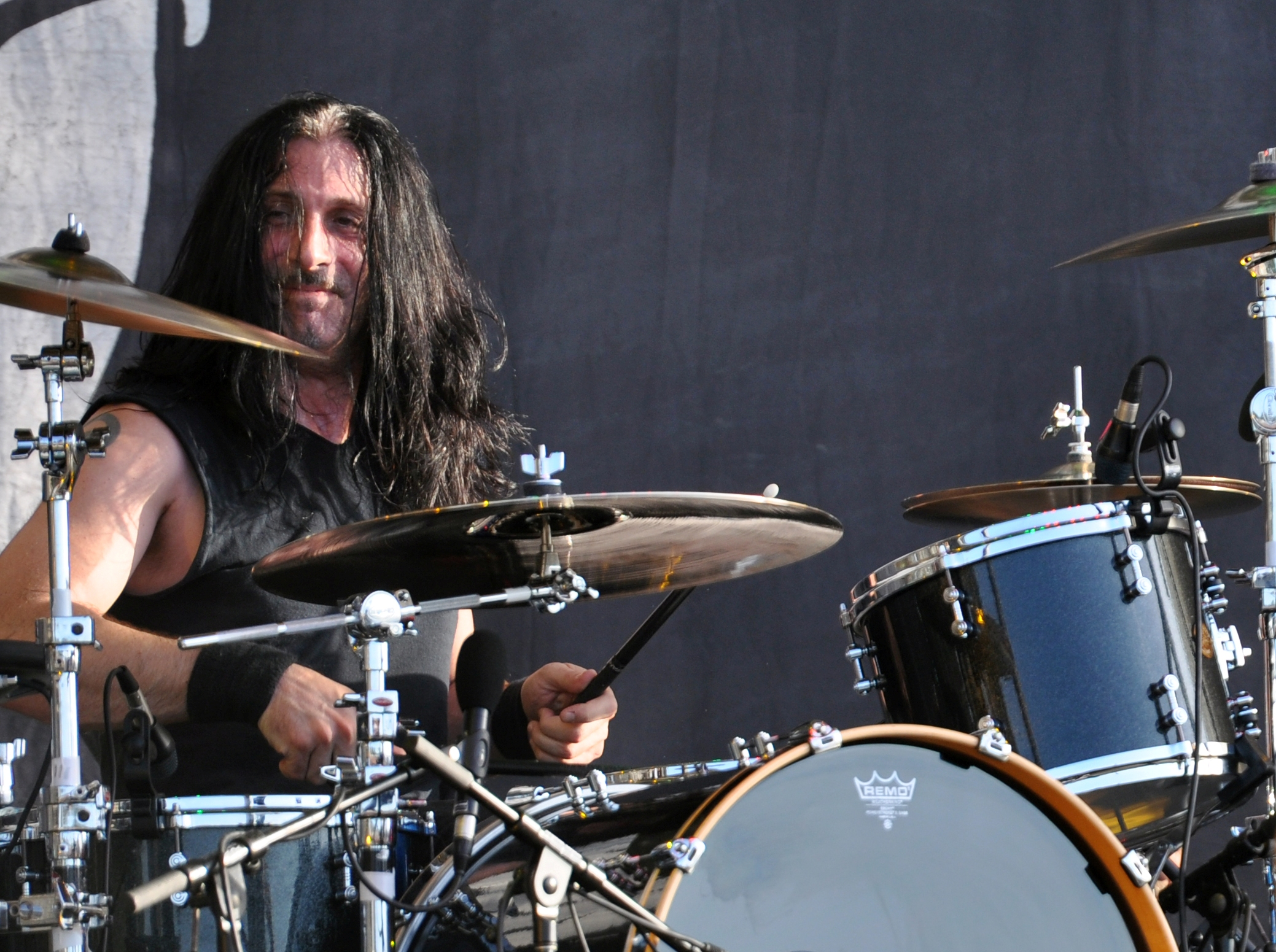
Kelly with Danzig at Wacken Open Air 2013

Kelly joined Type O Negative in 1994 to replace Sal Abruscato. During an online interview, Kelly denied the oft-claimed rumour he had previously been the band's drum tech. Kelly recorded the albums October Rust (1996), World Coming Down (1999), Life is Killing Me (2003), and Dead Again (2007) with the band, as well as the Black Sabbath cover "Paranoid" included as a bonus track on the reissue of the band's second album The Origin of the Feces (1994).

Kelly served as a fill-in drummer for heavy metal band Pist.On on an American tour while their drummer, Jeff McManus, dealt with chronic muscle pain.

On February 25, 2011, it was announced that Kelly would be replacing Will Hunt as the drummer for Black Label Society for the remainder of their European tour. He made his first live performance with the band that night at La Cigale in Paris, France.

On March 10, 2014, it was announced that Vinny Appice had left Kill Devil Hill, and that Kelly was his replacement.

On January 29, 2018, it was announced via the band's website that A Pale Horse Named Death had recruited Tommy Spano of Living Colour lead vocalist Corey Glover's solo band and Sekond Skyn as the new drummer, replacing Kelly. On April 5, 2018, it was announced that Kelly was once again the band's drummer, but since has been replaced again by Spano for the band's latest album Letting Go (2023).

Kelly has been the drummer for original Misfits vocalist Glenn Danzig's eponymous solo band Danzig since 2002 (with the exception of a hiatus from 2003 to 2005); he has recorded drums for the band's ninth album Deth Red Sabaoth (2010), covers album Skeletons (2015), and two tracks on the album Black Laden Crown (2017).

On September 9, 2020, it was announced that Kelly had joined Quiet Riot as the replacement of deceased drummer Frankie Banali. Kelly had previously filled in for Banali on the band's 2019 and 2020 shows.

In late 2021, Kelly formed Patriarchs in Black with guitarist Dan Lorenzo (Hades/Non-Fiction). To date, the band has released four full-length albums featuring a variety of guest vocalists and bassists; their fourth album released on August 15, 2025, on Metalville Records.

== Discography ==
Type O Negative

- The Origin of the Feces (Reissue) (1994) – ("Paranoid" only)
- October Rust (1996)
- World Coming Down (1999)
- Life is Killing Me (2003)
- Dead Again (2007)

Danzig

- Deth Red Sabaoth (2010)
- Skeletons (2015) – (drums on tracks 1, 2, 4, 5 & 9)
- Black Laden Crown (2017) – (drums on tracks 1 & 5)

Seven Witches

- Rebirth (2013)
- The Way of The Wicked (2015)

Silvertomb

- Edge of Existence (2019)

Seventh Void

- Heaven is Gone (2009)

Kill Devil Hill

- Seas of Oblivion (2023)

Rex Brown

- Smoke on this... (2017)

Roadrunner United

- Blood and Flames (2005) – (drums on track 13)

Patriarchs in Black

- Reach for the Scars (2022)
- My Veneration (2023)
- Visioning (2024)
- Home (2025)
