= Skeletons (Danzig album) =

- Glenn Danzig poses with model Kayden Kross in an homage to David Bowie's 1973 covers album Pin Ups

Studio album by Danzig
- Released: November 27, 2015
- Genre: Heavy metal; hard rock
- Length: 33:51
- Label: Evilive, Nuclear Blast
- Producer: Glenn Danzig

Danzig chronology
Deth Red Sabaoth (2010)	Skeletons (2015)	Black Laden Crown (2017)

Singles from Skeletons
- 1. "Devil's Angels" Released: September 4, 2015

Skeletons is the tenth studio album by American heavy metal band Danzig, released on November 27, 2015, and consisting entirely of cover versions of songs from the 1960s through 1980s, selected by singer Glenn Danzig.

== Background and recording ==
Glenn Danzig claimed to have planned to do an album of cover songs as far back as 1979. In 2011 he stated that he had recorded "about seven or eight covers" and was considering releasing them as an EP: "There's a cover of Sixties band The Young Rascals and I'm doing a Nuggets track too. Nuggets were these pre-punk, psychedelic, garage albums. They produced a bunch of influential compilations in the early Seventies. So currently this is an ongoing project, laying down as many tracks as I feel like and maybe releasing a seven- or eight-song EP of the best ones once they're done." In announcing the album in June 2015 he stated "I had to put it out now or else there would be so many songs I'd want to do that I wouldn't be able to do it. Even the way I did it, there are so many songs I still wanted to cover. My attitude with covers is, make it your own or else leave it alone."

Skeletons marked the first time since 1994's Danzig 4 that the band had recorded more than one album with the same line-up, but as with their previous album Deth Red Sabaoth, it does not include bassist Steve Zing. Danzig sang and played piano, guitar, and bass guitar on all of the tracks, and played drums on half of them. Johnny Kelly played drums on the rest of the tracks, while Tommy Victor played lead guitar as well as other guitar and bass parts. The album was produced by Glenn Danzig, engineered by Chris Rakestraw at Sunset Lodge in California, mixed by Danzig and Rakestraw, and mastered by Gene Grimaldi.

With the exception of ZZ Top's 1986 single "Rough Boy", all of the songs covered on Skeletons date to between 1962 and 1974, when Glenn was between the ages of six and eighteen. The album's title refers to "'skeletons in your closet', it's like pulling out old songs", he said. "These are my skeletons. You may or may not know that I dig these songs. You could say that some of this music is the actual basis and skeleton of what I listened to growing up — ultimately informing the kind of music I like. It's the foundation. If you took Elvis and [Black] Sabbath out of my life, I probably wouldn't be the Glenn Danzig you know! I'm glad both sides are represented on this record." Two songs from outlaw biker films of the late 1960s are covered: "Devil's Angels" from the 1967 film of the same title, and "Satan" from 1969's Satan's Sadists. A cover of Nancy Sinatra and Lee Hazlewood's 1967 hit "Some Velvet Morning" was recorded as a duet featuring former Runaways singer Cherie Currie, but was left off of the final album because, according to Glenn, "the publisher wouldn't let us use the song because they didn't like what we did with it." It was, however, released online prior to the album coming out. He also stated that a cover of an Ennio Morricone Spaghetti Western theme was recorded, but that he was "not happy with the way it came out, but maybe I'll fix it and put it on some kind of limited edition thing."

In a 2017 radio interview with Full Metal Jackie, Glenn also mentioned that a cover of Iggy Pop's "Funtime" and Patsy Cline's "Walkin' After Midnight" (another duet with Cherie Currie) were recorded during the Skeletons sessions.

== Cover image ==
The cover image, photographed by Paul Brown, is based on the cover of David Bowie's 1973 covers album Pin Ups, and features Glenn Danzig posing in skull makeup with Kayden Kross, a former pornographic film actor, in a similar pose to that of Bowie and supermodel Twiggy on the Pin Ups cover. "One of my favorite covers records is David Bowie's Pin Ups", said Danzig, "and I wanted to do a take on that, and the record is called Skeletons so I decided I'd do the skull face." Danzig had worn skull makeup on a few occasions during his time in the Misfits; he recalled "I wore makeup only at a couple of live shows and maybe for a photo shoot. I think it was originally for a Halloween show, '79, at [New York City's] Irving Plaza. I also had the skeleton shirt and skeleton clothes on, so I was a full punk skeleton man."

== "Devil's Angels" ==
The album's first single, a cover of the theme song from the 1967 outlaw biker film Devil's Angels, was originally released online in 2012. A 7" single was released, with a "vocal & keyboard version" of the album track "Satan" (also a theme from an outlaw biker film, 1969's Satan's Sadists) as the B-side. Of the song, Glenn said: "I've wanted to record 'Devil's Angels' since 1979 and this is exactly the same arrangement I had for it back then, so it pretty much sounds like that late '70s style of mine. I'm really happy with the way it turned out; it actually came out much better than I had hoped it would."

== Critical reception ==
Professional ratings
Review scores
Source	Rating
AllMusic	3.5/5 stars
Blabbermouth.net	5/10
Consequence of Sound	C+
MetalSucks	1/5 stars
Newsday	B+
PopMatters	7/10 stars

James Christopher Monger of AllMusic rated Skeletons three and a half stars out of five, calling it "a delight for longtime fans, especially those who lean harder toward the Misfit/Samhain end of the spectrum. Raw, rowdy, and devoid of any sort of studio chicanery, Skeletons feels less like a proper Danzig album and more like a home recording of a boozy late-night house show. Surprisingly, its slapdash, lo-fi demeanor mostly works in its favor." He was critical of the slower tracks, saying they were "weighed down by vocal takes that sound like they were laid down after a ten-mile run", and opined that the album would have benefited from the use of an outside producer, but compared it favorably to the band's previous album, 2010's Deth Red Sabaoth, calling it "a hell of a lot more fun."

== Track listing ==
No.	Title	Writer(s)	Original performer	Length
1.	"Devil's Angels"	Mike Curb, Guy Hemric, Jerry Styner	Davie Allan & The Arrows	2:41
2.	"Satan"	Harley Hatcher	Paul Wibier	4:14
3.	"Let Yourself Go"	Joy Byers	Elvis Presley	2:57
4.	"N.I.B."	Geezer Butler, Tony Iommi, Ozzy Osbourne, Bill Ward	Black Sabbath	5:04
5.	"Lord of the Thighs"	Steven Tyler	Aerosmith	4:05
6.	"Action Woman"	Warren Kendrick	The Litter	3:42
7.	"Rough Boy"	Billy Gibbons, Dusty Hill, Frank Beard	ZZ Top	4:43
8.	"With a Girl Like You"	Reg Presley	The Troggs	1:53
9.	"Find Somebody"	Eddie Brigati, Felix Cavaliere	The Young Rascals	3:48
10.	"Crying in the Rain"	Howard Greenfield, Carole King	The Everly Brothers	2:44

== Personnel ==
Credits adapted from the album's liner notes.

- Glenn Danzig – vocals; piano; guitars; bass guitar; drums on tracks 3, 6, 7, 8, and 10; producer; mix engineer
- Tommy Victor – lead guitar, guitars, bass guitar
- Johnny Kelly – drums on tracks 1, 2, 4, 5, and 9
- Chris Rakestraw – audio engineer, mix engineer
- Gene Grimaldi – audio mastering
- Paul Brown – cover and interior photographs
- Corey Soria – back cover photograph

== Charts ==
Chart (2015)	Peak position
German Albums (Offizielle Top 100)	84
UK Independent Albums (OCC)	16
US Billboard 200	198
US Independent Albums (Billboard)	8
US Top Hard Rock Albums (Billboard)	6
US Top Rock Albums (Billboard)	17
