= The Sellout =

The Sellout may refer to:

- The Sellout (film), a 1952 US film
- The Sellout (album), a 2010 album by American R&B-soul singer–songwriter Macy Gray
- The Sellout (novel), a 2015 novel by Paul Beatty

== See also ==
- SellOut, an Australian daytime game show
- Sellout
