= Danzig (band) =

American heavy metal band

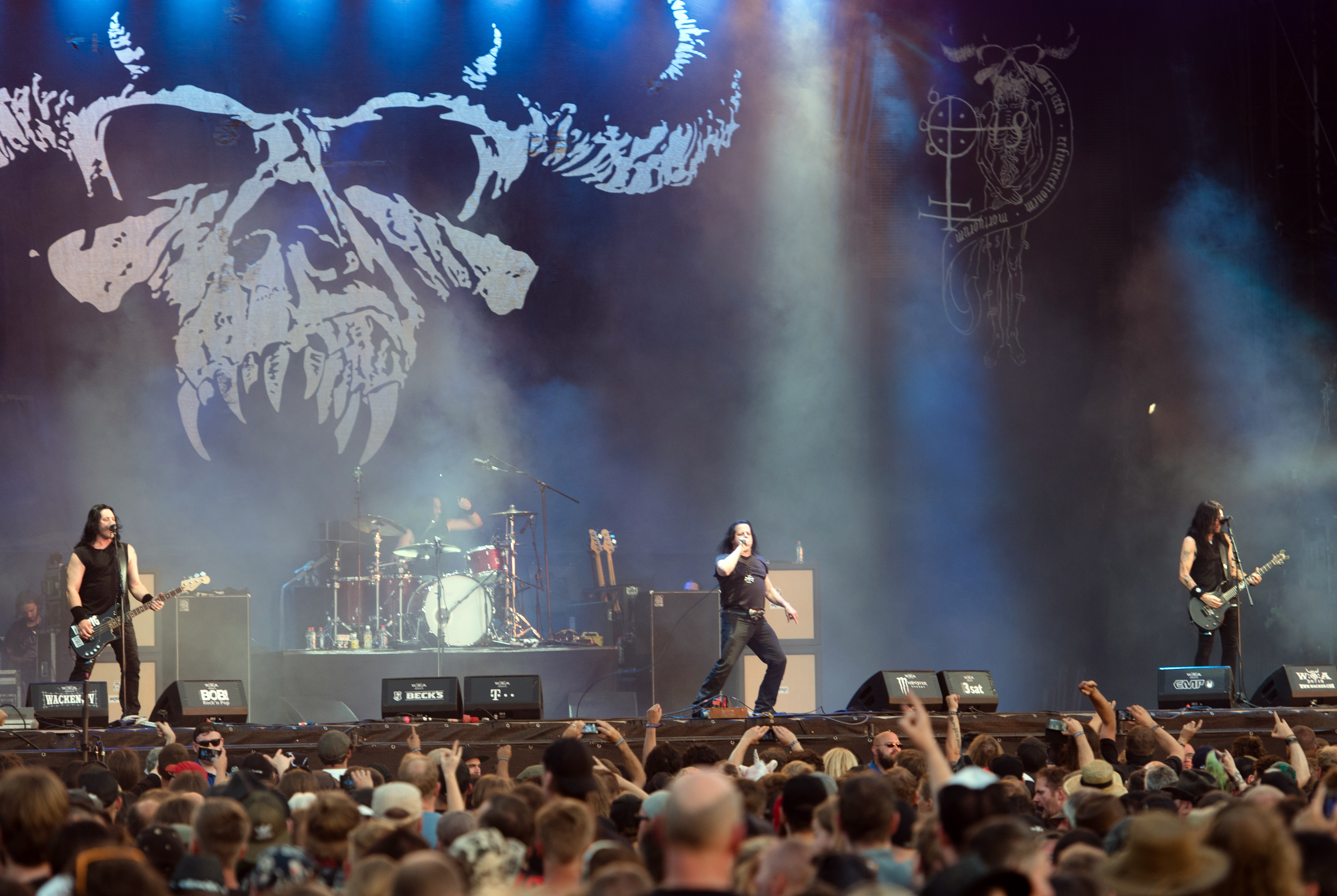
- Danzig at Wacken Open Air 2018

Background information
- Origin: Lodi, New Jersey, U.S.
- Genres: Heavy metal; hard rock; blues rock
- Years active: 1987–present
- Labels: Def American; American; Hollywood; E-Magine; Spitfire; Evilive; Megaforce; Restless; The End
- Spinoff of: Samhain
- Members: Glenn Danzig; Tommy Victor; Steve Zing; Karl Rosqvist
- Past members: See full list
- Website: danzig-verotik.com

Danzig is an American heavy metal band led by Misfits and former Samhain frontman Glenn Danzig. Formed in 1987 in Lodi, New Jersey, from the latter band, its "classic" lineup included the eponymous vocalist and keyboardist (real name Glenn Anzalone), guitarist John Christ (real name John Knoll), bassist Eerie Von (real name Eric Stellmann), and drummer Chuck Biscuits (real name Charles Montgomery). Earning a major hit with a live version of its 1988 song "Mother", the band's musical style fuses gothic atmospheres with blues-infused rock and metal. As of 2023, Danzig has released 12 studio albums (two consisting entirely of cover versions), two EPs, one live album, and one compilation album.

== History ==
=== Beginnings (1986–1987) ===
On July 14, 1986, Samhain performed at The Ritz in New York in what proved to be their final show. In attendance was producer Rick Rubin, who was scouting bands to sign to his record label, Def Jam Recordings. Rubin initially expressed interest in signing only Glenn Danzig, intending to make him vocalist for a hard rock supergroup that Rubin envisioned. However, Danzig refused to sign unless Samhain's bassist Eerie Von was also signed. In 1987, Rubin added John Christ on guitar and Chuck Biscuits (ex-Black Flag) on drums. To reflect the change in musical direction and avoid having to start anew after future lineup changes, Glenn, on Rubin's advice, changed the name of Samhain to his surname, Danzig. The first release from the band, minus Eerie Von, was the song "You And Me (Less than Zero)" from the Less than Zero soundtrack and credited as Glenn Danzig & The Power and Fury Orchestra.

=== "Classic" era (1988–1993) ===
In 1988, Danzig released its self-titled debut album on Def American (later renamed to American Recordings). The band toured worldwide in support of the album throughout 1988 and 1989. They opened for Slayer on their South of Heaven tour in North America and Metallica on their ...And Justice for All tour in Europe Subsequently, Danzig headlined their own tour; it included support from bands such as Murphy's Law, Mudhoney, Accept, Armored Saint, Circus of Power, White Zombie, Sick of It All and Carnivore. Danzig is the band's best-selling album, having been certified gold in the U.S. in 1994, and eventually going platinum.

In 1990, Danzig released its second album, Danzig II: Lucifuge. Following the album's release Danzig embarked on the Long Way Back From Hell Tour throughout the remainder of the year with bands such as Soundgarden, Trouble and Depp Jones opened for the band throughout the tour.

By 1992, Rubin's involvement with the band had waned. Danzig himself took credit for co-producing the third album, Danzig III: How the Gods Kill. In the following year, the band released the Thrall-Demonsweatlive EP, which contained several live tracks from the band's 1992 Halloween show as well as three new studio tracks. The live version of "Mother", a song from the first album, became popular on album-oriented radio stations while its music video received considerable attention on MTV-programmed shows such as Beavis and Butt-Head, Headbangers Ball and 120 Minutes. The band were eventually awarded in the fall of 1994 with two gold albums for the exceptional sales of their first record and Thrall-Demonsweatlive. The renewed popularity of "Mother" not only helped raise Danzig's profile in the music industry, but also saw the band starting to perform at larger venues such as arenas and amphitheaters, which included headlining US tours with bands like White Zombie, Kyuss, Type O Negative, Godflesh and then-emerging acts Korn and Marilyn Manson, as well as opening for Metallica and Black Sabbath.

=== "Industrial" era (1994–1999) ===
On October 4, 1994, Danzig 4 was released. The album sold well, but did not contain a hit on par with the "Mother" single. The album's second single, "Cantspeak", was also a staple in MTV's rotation, but unlike "Mother" failed to appear on the Billboard Hot 100. "Cantspeak" is the band's only single other than "Mother" to chart on Billboard. Amid accusations of unpaid royalties and broken promises, Danzig's relationship with Rubin deteriorated and the band left the record label. The Danzig 4p tour began in late 1994, throughout the US with Type O Negative and Godflesh opening. The second leg of the tour took place in the spring of 1995, once again in the US with Marilyn Manson and Korn serving as support, the final leg of the tour took place in the summer with shows in Europe and South America.

Around this time, the band's lineup began to dissolve as well. First, Chuck Biscuits left the band in the summer of 1994 due to royalty disagreements. According to a special issue of Kerrang!, former Nirvana drummer Dave Grohl turned down an approach by the band. Biscuits was replaced by Joey Castillo, who made his first public appearance as a member of Danzig at an in-store signing the day of the fourth album's release. Coincidentally, Castillo would later replace Grohl in Queens of the Stone Age. Although the band had toured successfully with its new drummer during the fall and winter of 1994–1995, it was during this time that Danzig was actively seeking a new guitarist, with Pepper Keenan and Dez Cadena considered possible replacements. John Christ and Eerie Von both resigned on July 5, 1995.

Throughout 1996, Danzig took part in the inaugural Ozzfest playing on the main stage. In October 1996, Danzig 5: Blackacidevil was released. The album was mostly a solo effort by Danzig, although Jerry Cantrell of Alice in Chains played lead guitar on three of the album's tracks. Joey Castillo played drums, the sole member still in the band from the 4p Tour. Castillo would record on two more Danzig albums, making him the longest-standing member outside of the original lineup. The Blackacidevil tour took place in early 1997 with multiple US dates.

For the next few years, Danzig was tied up in a legal battle with Rubin over the rights to unreleased material the band recorded for American Recordings. In November 1999, Danzig 6:66 Satan's Child was released. A long-planned Samhain box set was also released, followed by a Samhain reunion tour. Samhain opened for Danzig for six weeks during the tour and consisted of Steve Zing and London May switching between bass and drums.

=== Return to form (2000–2011) ===
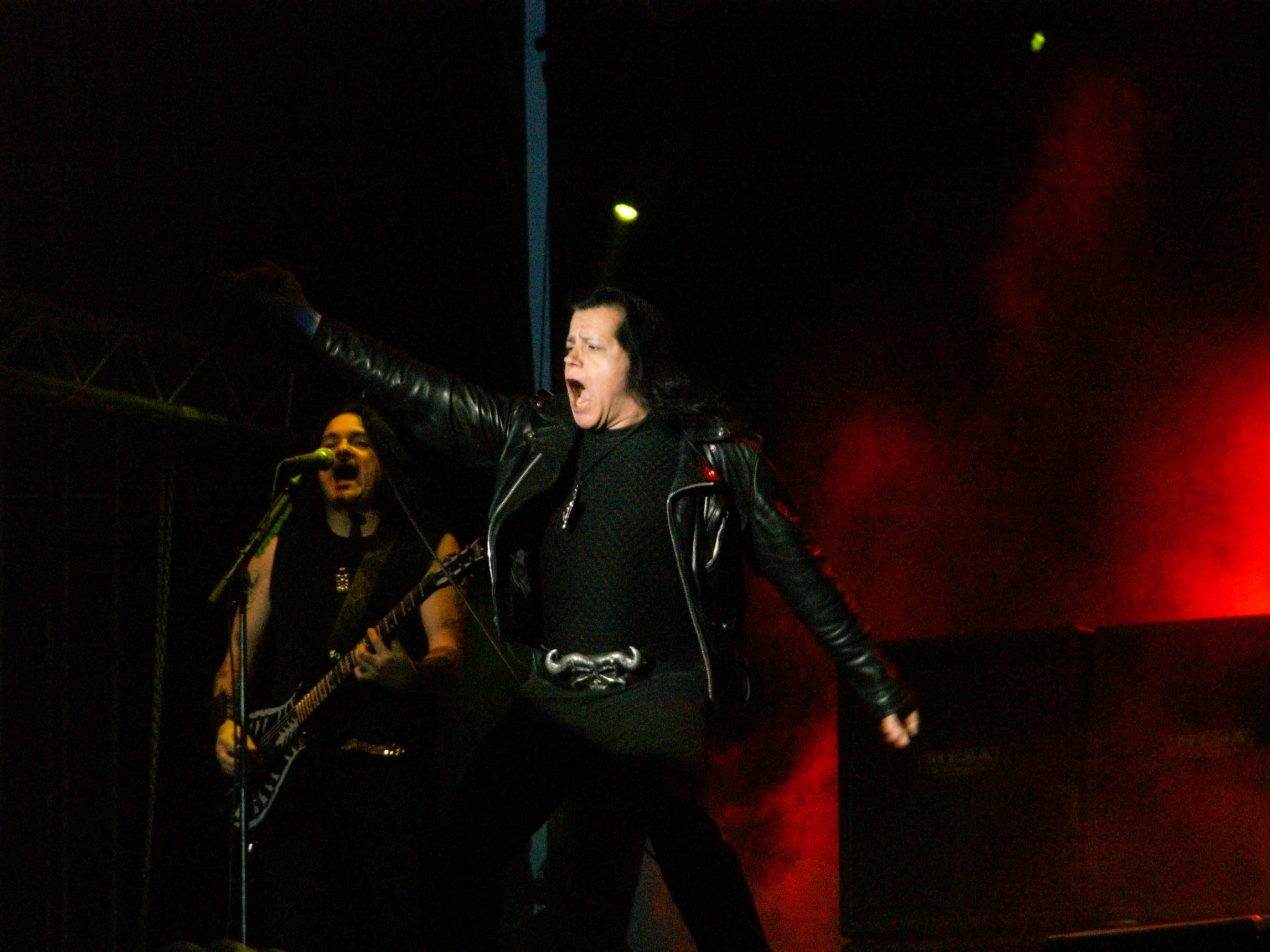
Danzig performing in 2010

By 2000, Danzig's lineup had stabilized with the addition of guitarist Todd Youth and bassist Howie Pyro, both veterans of the New York City punk scene. In the spring of 2000, the band embarked on the Satans Child Tour throughout the US featuring Six Feet Under and Disturbed as the opening acts.

In 2002, this lineup released the album Danzig 777: I Luciferi. Later that year the band headlined the I Luciferi US tour, opening acts included Prong, Chimaira and Damaged, the European leg was supported by Marduk. In late 2003, Danzig toured throughout the US and Europe. In 2004, Danzig released their eighth studio album, Circle of Snakes, with the line up featuring Tommy Victor of Prong on guitar, who had toured as a member of Danzig years earlier. Soon after the album's release, Danzig undertook the Blackest of the Black tour across the US, replacing Circle of Snakes drummer Bevan Davies with Johnny Kelly (of Type O Negative).

Throughout 2006, Glenn Danzig stated in several interviews that he had grown tired of the touring cycle and did not expect to partake in any more large-scale tours. Instead, Danzig would go on small, localized tours, such as the 10 west coast dates they played for the 2006 Blackest of the Black tour which was supported by Kataklysm, Trivium and Eye of Fire. This tour debuted Kenny Hickey (of Type O Negative) as the band's new guitarist, while the East Coast dates saw the addition of former Samhain member, Steve Zing on bass. Throughout the tour Danzig's former Misfits bandmate Doyle appeared on stage with Danzig numerous times. The two also performed three special Misfits sets in the East Coast. They would meet again in 2007, when Doyle’s band Gorgeous Frankenstein played their first tour, opening for Danzig. Doyle continued to join Danzig on several occasions to play 30-minute-long sets of classic Misfits songs.

In October 2006, Glenn Danzig released Black Aria II, the follow-up to his solo classical album, Black Aria. Black Aria was re-released by Evilive in May 2007. He spent the rest of the year completing the production and packaging of The Lost Tracks of Danzig, a double CD containing 26 unreleased songs that span the entire Danzig catalog, which was released on July 10, 2007. Danzig has also stated that he plans to record a dark blues album with either Jerry Cantrell or Hank Williams III.

In August 2008, Glenn Danzig announced that Danzig (the band) would do a 20th-anniversary tour, celebrating the release of their self-titled debut album. This was the band's first full US tour in three years, which also included stops in Canada and Mexico. Also asked in August 2008 if the ninth Danzig album was planned, Glenn Danzig replied:

I have been in the studio here and there working on new songs but don't know when they will come out. I was thinking of putting one up on the Danzig site so the fans could check it out. Even thought about doing one on this tour.

— Glenn Danzig, August 2008

On December 26, 2009, Danzig performed at the Starland Ballroom in New Jersey. The show was notable for featuring a special appearance by Michale Graves who, along with Doyle and Dr. Chud, performed several songs by the reformed version of the Misfits.

On March 10, 2010, a Danzig lyric book was released, titled Hidden Lyrics of the Left Hand. The book contains unreleased song lyrics combined with illustrations by Simon Bisley.

Danzig released Deth Red Sabaoth, their ninth studio album, on June 22, 2010. It is the band's first proper studio album in six years, since 2004's Circle of Snakes. Both Tommy Victor and Johnny Kelly appeared on the record. Throughout the fall of that year the band continued their Blackest Of The Black Tour throughout the US.

In January 2011, Danzig was announced for the 2011 Download Festival at Donington Park, England, alongside bands including Rob Zombie, Alice Cooper, and System of a Down. On the first day of the festival, Danzig headlined the Pepsi Max stage. On June 12, 2011, Danzig played at the Nova Rock Festival.

On October 25, 2011, a greatest hits album entitled The Essential Danzig was to be released through Sony BMG. However, as of 2017, this has yet to happen, nor have details of the release been given.

October 2011 also saw a rare string of reunion shows called the "Danzig Legacy" tour. The shows consisted of a Danzig mini-set, followed by a Samhain mini-set, a set of Danzig and Doyle performing Misfits songs, and then ending with three Danzig songs and the performance of "Skulls".

=== Recent activity (2012–present) ===
In May 2012, Danzig released the song "Devil's Angels", the theme from the 1967 film of the same name, from Skeletons. "I've wanted to record this song since 1979 and this is exactly the same arrangement I had for it back then, so it pretty much sounds like that late 70s style of mine. I'm really happy with the way it turned out, it actually came out much better than I had hoped it would. We're going to be playing it live on these upcoming shows."

In April 2013, Glenn Danzig told Full Metal Jackie that he would begin work on new Danzig material with Tommy Victor and Johnny Kelly after the 25th anniversary tour. In February 2014, the band began recording three new songs for their 10th studio album of original material. The resulting album, Black Laden Crown, was released on May 26, 2017 on Nuclear Blast and AFM Records. On October 25, 2014, Danzig performed at Knotfest on the Rockstar Energy Drink main stage.

On September 4, 2015, Danzig released a 7" vinyl single, limited to 500 copies, of "Devil's Angels" to promote the covers album Skeletons. On October 21, 2015, during an interview with Loudwire, lead singer Glenn Danzig stated the band's current tour with Superjoint could be his last.

In October 2015, Glenn Danzig appeared on SiriusXM to debut the band's cover of "Always on My Mind" from the tentatively titled Danzig Sings Elvis album. In July 2016, the band's official Facebook page confirmed that Danzig Sings Elvis was finished; however, the album was not released until April 24, 2020.

Danzig returned to perform at Riot Fest in 2017. Their album Black Laden Crown was released on May 26, 2017. The album debuted at number 97 on the Billboard 200 selling 6,475 copies in its first week. In 2018, Danzig played multiple shows in the US and Europe in celebration of Danzig 30th anniversary.

When asked in May 2020 by Billboard.com about the possibility of another Danzig album with all-new material, Glenn Danzig said, "For now, people are going to have to be happy with the Danzig Sings Elvis record, and I'll see in a couple years if I feel like recording another. If something comes in my mind, maybe I'll do another. Maybe I'll just give it away for free or something. I don't know. But as long as I'm having a good time, it doesn't really matter."

In May 2023, Glenn Danzig unveiled a series of live performance dates in celebration of the 35th anniversary of the self-titled debut album. The band played the album in its entirety for these concerts.

In 2025, the band drew controversy for allegedly selling merchandise that included the likeness of neo-Nazi symbol the Black Sun. On December 31, the group performed a special show dubbed "Danzig Sings Elvis" at the House of Blues in Anaheim, California.

Danzig embarked on a US tour in September 2026, throughout the US including a performance at Louder Than Life festival. Two months later, the band's original guitarist John Christ died at the age of 61.

== Artistry ==
Danzig became a unique voice in the rock scene for playing bluesy, doom-laden metal, with Glenn Danzig crooning in the style of Roy Orbison and Elvis Presley. A departure from the horror punk of Misfits and deathrock of Samhain, the eponymous frontman's previous bands, Danzig is primarily a heavy metal band, who is sometimes seen as part of the doom metal and gothic metal sub-genres. They have also been described as hard rock, blues rock and as part of the first wave of alternative metal. As RockLists.com put it, "The classic Danzig lineup had Glenn himself singing and playing keyboards, John Christ on guitar, Eerie Von on bass and Chuck Biscuits on drums, and the sound was pure gothic menace wrapped around bluesy, slow-grinding metal, served up with a black cape and a bad attitude." Following the band's self-titled debut record, which is "dry, with the vocals forward in the mix", according to UDiscover Music, each album gets progressively flashier in production, with Christ's solos becoming more integral. After three-fourths of the original lineup (Biscuits, Christ and Von) split up following or prior to the release of Danzig 4, the group experimented with industrial music on their fifth and sixth albums, Blackacidevil and 6:66 Satan's Child respectively, but later returned to heavy metal.

== Members ==
Current

- Glenn Danzig – lead vocals, rhythm guitar, bass, keyboards, songwriting (1987–present)
- Karl Rosqvist – drums (2007-2008, 2022–present)
- Steve Zing – bass, backing vocals (2006–present; touring only)
- Tommy Victor – lead guitar, bass, backing vocals (1996–1997, 2002–2005, 2008–present)

== Discography ==
- Danzig (1988)
- Danzig II: Lucifuge (1990)
- Danzig III: How the Gods Kill (1992)
- Danzig 4 (1994)
- Danzig 5: Blackacidevil (1996)
- 6:66 Satan's Child (1999)
- 777: I Luciferi (2002)
- Circle of Snakes (2004)
- Deth Red Sabaoth (2010)
- Skeletons (2015)
- Black Laden Crown (2017)
- Danzig Sings Elvis (2020)

== Bibliography ==
- Flick, Larry (November 5, 1994). "R&R Expanding for Publishers: Execs Help Shape Young Writers, Producers". Billboard. Vol. 106, no. 45. New York. p. 18. ISSN 0006-2510.
