= Deth Red Sabaoth =

Studio album by Danzig
- Released: June 22, 2010
- Recorded: 2008–2010
- Studios: Sunset Lodge, Los Angeles; Paramount Studios, Hollywood
- Genre: Heavy metal
- Length: 52:04
- Label: Evilive/The End Records
- Producer: Glenn Danzig

Danzig chronology
The Lost Tracks of Danzig (2007)	Deth Red Sabaoth (2010)	Skeletons (2015)

Singles from Deth Red Sabaoth
- 1. "On a Wicked Night" Released: June 8, 2010; 2. "Ju Ju Bone" Released: June 10, 2011

Professional ratings
Review scores
Source	Rating
About.com	4.5/5 stars
AllMusic	3/5 stars
The A.V. Club	B
Brave Words	7.5/10 stars
College Music Journal	(favorable)
Fearnet	(favorable)
Metal Hammer	8/10 stars
Revolver	4/5 stars
Rock Hard	7/10 stars
Ultimate Guitar	(8.3/10)

Deth Red Sabaoth is the ninth studio album by American heavy metal band Danzig, released on June 22, 2010, through Evilive/The End Records. Deth Red Sabaoth marked Danzig's highest-charting album since the release of Danzig 4 in 1994.

== Background ==
Nearly two years in production, Deth Red Sabaoth is the first release of new Danzig studio material in six years, since 2004's Circle of Snakes. However, in these six years, frontman Glenn Danzig had released his second solo album, entitled Black Aria II, in 2006, while Danzig (the band) released a compilation of previously unreleased material, entitled The Lost Tracks of Danzig, in 2007.

== Music and recording ==
For Deth Red Sabaoth, Danzig took a different approach to recording: "I wanted to have an organic sound, bigger and thicker, so I went out and bought some 1970s Kustom tuck 'n' roll bass amps to play some of the guitar parts through. You'll hear real reverb, real tremolo on this album, which sounds completely different than the stuff that's done with computer chips."

Glenn Danzig produced the album himself, recorded most of the bass tracks, and played drums on the song "Black Candy", his first drumming credit since select tracks on his former band Samhain's 1986 album November-Coming-Fire.

Deth Red Sabaoth is the first studio album to feature Type O Negative drummer Johnny Kelly (who once joined Danzig during their 2002-2003 tour, but became a full-time member in 2005). It is also the second Danzig album to feature Tommy Victor on guitar. Bassist Steve Zing (who joined the touring band in 2006) does not appear on the album, as bass guitar duties were handled by Glenn Danzig and Tommy Victor.

Opening track "Hammer of the Gods" makes reference to Ragnarök, a great battle in Norse mythology.

When asked about various proposed meanings of the song "Black Candy", Glenn Danzig responded "It's a metaphor for so many different things so they could be right and they could be wrong. But it is about a lot of different things, not just one thing."

A song titled "Long Dark Road" was recorded during the Deth Red Sabaoth recording sessions and was talked about prior to being finished, however it is not featured on the final track listing. Glenn Danzig has confirmed that the song was never intended for inclusion on the album.

== Album title ==
According to Glenn Danzig, the word "Sabaoth" found in the album title is the original pronunciation for the word "Sabbath", and is unrelated to the later Hebrew use of the word to mean "armies".

== Artwork ==
The album artwork was designed by American artist Joe Chiodo.

== Album editions ==
Deth Red Sabaoth is distributed in the USA by The End Records, and distributed in Europe by AFM Records.

There are several editions of the album available:

- Digipak CD (The End Records)
- Digipak CD limited edition (AFM Records)
- Jewel case CD (AFM Records)
- 12" black vinyl - limited to 2,000 copies (The End Records)
- 12" red vinyl - limited to 1,000 copies (The End Records)
- 12" picture vinyl - limited to 2,000 copies (AFM Records)

Two limited edition box sets are also available, with the contents held within a Deth Red Sabaoth urn:

- Deth Red Sabaoth digipak CD, "On a Wicked Night" 7" vinyl, autographed poster - limited to 666 copies (The End Records)
- Deth Red Sabaoth digipak CD limited edition, certificate of authenticity, 4 Deth Red Sabaoth buttons - limited to 1,666 copies (AFM Records)

== Singles ==
"On a Wicked Night" is the album's first single, debuting at #6 on Billboard's Top Singles chart.

The single has also been released as a:

- 7" vinyl - limited to 2,000 copies (The End Records)
- Promo CD - with promo sticker (sold during the 9-city Deth Red Sabaoth tour) (The End Records)
- 7" vinyl - with picture sleeve (AFM Records)

"Ju Ju Bone" is the album's second single. The single has also been released as a 7" vinyl through AFM Records.

== Reception ==
- About.com - "A powerful sonic statement which echoes the legacy and reaffirms the musical legitimacy of this legendary man and band...Everything is working as a well-oiled machine, and it's Danzig the BAND who return here as conquering, triumphant kings."
- Ultimate Guitar - "Deth Red Sabaoth is proof that you don't need to play ultra fast to be granite heavy...Deth Red Sabaoth is a quality offering that won't replace his first three albums in anyone's mind but will surely jog your memory as to why you loved this artist in the first place."
- Fearnet - "The songwriting, arrangement and energy of this project all hold true to the elements that make Glenn and company great – dark, haunting and seductive themes, memorable hooks and a solid, warm sound that balances violent musical aggression with a doom-heavy melancholy feeling and still holds the power to seduce listeners to the dark side."

== Music videos ==
Music videos have been filmed for the songs "On a Wicked Night", "Night Star Hel", and "Ju Ju Bone". The music video for "On a Wicked Night" was shot on location at the 'BatCave' in the Hollywood Hills and features the pornographic actress Layla Rivera. The video for "Night Star Hel" remains unreleased. "Ju Ju Bone" was the third music video from the album and features the use of CGI effects.

== Track listing ==
1. "Hammer of the Gods" - 5:20
2. "The Revengeful" - 4:10
3. "Rebel Spirits" - 3:58
4. "Black Candy" - 4:08
5. "On a Wicked Night" - 4:02
6. "Deth Red Moon" - 3:58
7. "Ju Ju Bone" - 4:45
8. "Night Star Hel" - 6:42
9. "Pyre of Souls: Incanticle" - 3:18
10. "Pyre of Souls: Seasons of Pain" - 7:17
11. "Left Hand Rise Above" - 4:22

All songs written by Glenn Danzig

== Credits ==
- Glenn Danzig – vocals, bass, guitar, piano, drums (on "Black Candy")
- Tommy Victor – guitar, bass
- Johnny Kelly – drums

Production

- Producer: Glenn Danzig
- Mixing: Glenn Danzig, Chris Rakestraw
- Engineer: Chris Rakestraw

== Charts ==
Chart (2010)	Peak position
Austrian Albums (Ö3 Austria)	75
Finnish Albums (Suomen virallinen lista)	26
German Albums (Offizielle Top 100)	48
Swedish Albums (Sverigetopplistan)	36
UK Independent Albums (Official Charts)	47
US Billboard 200	35
US Independent Albums (Billboard)	3
US Top Hard Rock Albums (Billboard)	3
US Top Rock Albums (Billboard)	8
