= Black Laden Crown =

Studio album by Danzig
- Released: May 26, 2017
- Recorded: 2014–2017
- Genre: Heavy metal
- Length: 45:51
- Labels: Evilive, Nuclear Blast
- Producer: Glenn Danzig

Danzig chronology
Skeletons (2015)	Black Laden Crown (2017)	Danzig Sings Elvis (2020)

Black Laden Crown is the eleventh studio album, and the tenth of all-new original material, by the American heavy metal band Danzig, released on May 26, 2017.

== Background and production ==
Black Laden Crown is the band's first album of original material since Deth Red Sabaoth (2010), marking the longest gap between two studio albums in their career, and sees Danzig reunited with former drummer Joey Castillo, who appeared on two tracks but did not officially rejoin the band. The album took approximately three years to materialize, with the recording sessions taking place between 2014 and 2017, the longest length of time Danzig had taken to make an album. Black Laden Crown was recorded with five different drummers (Castillo, Johnny Kelly, Karl Rockfist, Dirk Verbeuren and Glenn Danzig himself), while the bass parts were handled by both Tommy Victor and Danzig.

The track "Devil on Hwy 9" premiered on Full Metal Jackie's radio show "Whiplash" on April 2, 2017.

The album's second single, "Last Ride", was made available on iTunes on May 12, 2017. A music video for the song, directed by Glenn Danzig and featuring Diane Foster, was published on the official Danzig YouTube page on September 1, 2017. The song was originally set to appear on a soundtrack for The Walking Dead TV series, but did not come to fruition: "It's on this album and it's called 'Last Ride'. I think the soundtrack album was scrapped. There were supposed to be a lot of other bands on it – I think Soundgarden was one of them – but it never came out. I had told people that if the soundtrack doesn't come out before my new album is being done, I'm putting it on my new record. It's not so much about the show itself, but more about the theme anyway. But who knows, if I do a video-clip for it, it could even have zombies."

The album cover art is by frequent collaborator Simon Bisley, who also painted the covers for Thrall: Demonsweatlive (1993), 6:66 Satan's Child (1999), and Lost Tracks of Danzig (2007).

== Reception ==
Professional ratings
Aggregate scores
Source	Rating
Metacritic	61/100
Review scores
Source	Rating
AllMusic	3/5 stars
Blabbermouth	7/10 stars
Bravewords	7/10 stars
Loudwire	favorable
Metal Injection	7.5/10 stars
Metal Forces	9/10 stars
Paste Magazine	6.7/10 stars
Pitchfork	6.4/10 stars
Punknews	3.5/5 stars
Teamrock	3/5 stars

The album was released to generally favorable reviews scoring 61 on aggregate website Metacritic, based on 8 reviews. In his review of the album for AllMusic, James Christopher Monger said "Black Laden Crown is at its best when the band keeps it slow and low, as they do with great success on workmanlike candelabra-burners like 'Last Ride,' 'Skulls & Daisies,' and 'Pull the Sun' and it's in those solemn moments of churning, Jim Morrison-esque torment and woe that Glenn Danzig sounds the most sinister and at ease." Loudwire's Michael Christopher, in a favorable review, said "... he sinks deeper into the blues for the darkest, dirge-filled Danzig work in years...Production-wise, Black Laden Crown is sometimes muddled leaving a bit to be desired, but that's no surprise given Danzig's renowned taste for old amps, analog recordings and anything else from way back in the day...the wheel isn't being reinvented; it's rolling exactly the way Danzig fans have come to expect." In his review of the album for Pitchfork, Andy O'Connor gave the album 6.4 out of 10 and said "Black Laden Crown is Danzig's strongest album in some time, because he's mostly built it around his own limitations. His thunder has quelled, but his ear is sharpening again on these metal blues. And it's that ear that made some of the most approachable yet enduring metal of the late '80s and early '90s."

Giving the album 6.7 out of ten, Aris Hunter Wales of Paste Magazine was slightly less positive stating "It feels a little unfair to hold Black Laden Crown up to the standards of Danzig's first four LPs, but that's where the mind naturally goes. It's important to give the forefathers a fair shake when they release new material, but in the end, odds are you're gonna reach for the inception of their renaissance before the newest slab."

== Track listing ==
All songs written by Glenn Danzig.

1. "Black Laden Crown" – 5:59
2. "Eyes Ripping Fire" – 4:19
3. "Devil on Hwy 9" – 3:52
4. "Last Ride" – 4:59
5. "The Witching Hour" – 5:59
6. "But a Nightmare" – 5:04
7. "Skulls & Daisies" – 3:58
8. "Blackness Falls" – 5:47
9. "Pull the Sun" – 5:54

== Personnel ==
- Glenn Danzig – vocals, piano, rhythm guitar, bass, drums (2, 4, 7)
- Tommy Victor – lead guitar, bass
- Johnny Kelly – drums (1, 5)
- Joey Castillo – drums (3, 8)
- Dirk Verbeuren – drums (6)
- Karl Rosqvist – drums (9)

== Charts ==
Chart (2017)	Peak position
Austrian Albums (Ö3 Austria)	42
Finnish Albums (Suomen virallinen lista)	35
German Albums (Offizielle Top 100)	35
Swiss Albums (Schweizer Hitparade)	97
UK Independent Albums (Official Charts)	46
UK Rock & Metal Albums (Official Charts)	30
US Billboard 200	97
US Top Album Sales (Billboard)	22
US Independent Albums (Billboard)	2
US Top Hard Rock Albums (Billboard)	3
US Top Rock Albums (Billboard)	15

== Releases ==
AFM Records:

- Digipak CD
- Black vinyl LP
- Neon yellow vinyl LP
- Neon orange vinyl LP
- Transparent red vinyl LP

Nuclear Blast USA:

- Digipak CD
- Orange/red swirl vinyl LP

Canadian exclusive:

- Red w/ black splatter

Bullmoose Indie Exclusive:

- Orange, red, black splatter vinyl LP

iTunes:

- Digital download (includes digital booklet)
