= Circle of Snakes =

Studio album by Danzig
- Released: August 31, 2004
- Recorded: October 2003 – June 2004
- Studio: Ocean Studios in Glendale, California and Paramount in Hollywood, California
- Genre: Heavy metal
- Length: 42:13
- Label: Evilive Records
- Producer: Glenn Danzig

Danzig chronology
I Luciferi (2002)	Circle of Snakes (2004)	The Lost Tracks of Danzig (2007)

Professional ratings
Review scores
Source	Rating
AllMusic	3/5 stars
antiMusic	4/5 stars
Brave Words	8/10 stars
KNAC	3.5/5 stars
Rock Hard	7/10 stars

Circle of Snakes is the eighth studio album by American heavy metal band Danzig. It was released on August 31, 2004. It is the first studio album by the band since their debut recording not to have a number incorporated into its title (though the debut has often since been retroactively called "Danzig 1").

== Music and recording ==
Circle of Snakes was recorded at Ocean Studios and Paramount Recording Studios, both based in California.

As with the band's eponymous debut, Circle of Snakes features a somewhat stripped-down sound.

For the recording of his vocals on Circle of Snakes, Glenn Danzig sought out microphones that would give his vocals more bottom end. Danzig's vocals are less prominent on most songs; instead the guitars, bass and drums are at the top of the album's mix. The album also features a notably heavy guitar tone.

Circle of Snakes marked the first Danzig recording to feature guitar work by Tommy Victor of Prong. Victor had been an occasional touring member of the band since 1996. Bevan Davies, previously a touring drummer for Jerry Cantrell, also appears on the album.

The album begins with "Wotans Procession", a dirge-like instrumental track.

The lyrics for the song "SkinCarver" suggest a serial killer with a fascination for human pelts.

The song "Skull Forrest" originated from a dream experienced by Glenn Danzig, in which he walked "through a corridor full of bones and rotting corpses, and people's faces I knew."

The track "1000 Devils Reign" is notably melodic amongst most other songs on Circle of Snakes. It served as promotion for the album, finding airplay on the Sirius Satellite Radio station Hard Attack.

The track "Night, BeSodom" was originally tentatively titled "Devilsnight".

== Reception ==
- AllMusic - "Glenn Danzig returns to his immediate post-Misfits roots with the stripped-down Circle of Snakes, an 11-track chunk of brutality that forgoes the murky alt-metal and industrial meanderings that marred many of his mid-to-late-'90s offerings."
- KNAC - "Circle of Snakes is a damn fine metallic rock record; and an excellent Danzig record. Label-changes, line-up changes, and time have not stopped this man from making great music."
- antiMusic - "Circle of Snakes is a heavy record. Everything you would want out of this band is here...From start to finish Circle of Snakes is full of ups and downs, darks and lights, but proves to be a completely satisfying album."

== Music videos ==
A music video was released for the song "Circle of Snakes".

== Track listing ==
All songs written by Glenn Danzig.

1. "Wotans Procession" – 2:23
2. "SkinCarver" – 3:57
3. "Circle of Snakes" – 3:07
4. "1000 Devils Reign" – 3:47
5. "Skull Forrest" – 5:06
6. "HellMask" – 3:14
7. "When We Were Dead" – 4:46
8. "Night, BeSodom" – 3:28
9. "My Darkness" – 4:21
10. "NetherBound" – 3:41
11. "Black Angel, White Angel" – 4:23

== Credits ==
- Glenn Danzig – vocals, guitar, keyboards
- Bevan Davies – drums
- Jerry Montano – bass guitar
- Tommy Victor – guitar

== Charts ==
Chart (2004)	Peak position
Swedish Albums (Sverigetopplistan)	18
US Billboard 200	183
US Independent Albums (Billboard)	20
