= Type O Negative discography =

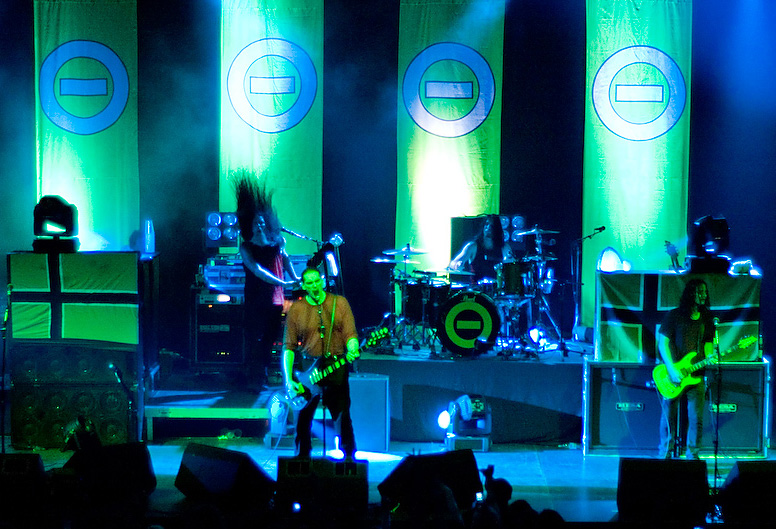
- Type O Negative performing in 2007
- Studio albums: 7
- Compilation albums: 4
- Singles: 10
- Promotional singles: 6
- Video albums: 2
- Music videos: 10

The discography of Type O Negative, an American gothic metal band, consists of seven studio albums, three live albums, two compilation albums, two video albums, 10 singles, six promotional singles and ten music videos.

== Albums ==
=== Studio albums ===
List of studio albums, with selected chart positions and certifications
Title	Album details	Peak chart positions										Sales	Certifications
Title	Album details	US	AUT	BEL (FL)	FIN	GER	NLD	NOR	SWE	SWI	UK	Sales	Certifications
Slow, Deep and Hard	Released: June 11, 1991; Label: Roadrunner; Formats: CD, CS, digital download	—	—	—	—	53	—	—	—	—	—		
The Origin of the Feces	Released: May 12, 1992; Label: Roadrunner; Formats: CD, CS, digital download	—	—	—	—	59	—	—	—	—	—		
Bloody Kisses	Released: August 17, 1993; Label: Roadrunner; Formats: CD, CS, LP, digital download	166	35	—	30	29	82	—	—	—	—	US: 900,000+	RIAA: Platinum
October Rust	Released: August 20, 1996; Label: Roadrunner; Formats: CD, CS, LP, digital download	42	8	33	7	5	21	15	3	46	26	US: 402,000+	RIAA: Gold
World Coming Down	Released: September 21, 1999; Label: Roadrunner; Formats: CD, CS, LP, digital download	39	17	—	3	3	25	16	17	—	49	US: 210,000+	
Life Is Killing Me	Released: June 17, 2003; Label: Roadrunner; Formats: CD, LP, digital download	39	51	—	5	9	46	—	51	98	78	US: 100,000+	
Dead Again	Released: March 13, 2007; Label: SPV; Formats: CD, LP, digital download	27	25	97	5	18	38	34	39	89	87		
"—" denotes a recording that did not chart or was not released in that territory.

=== Compilation albums ===
List of compilation albums, with selected chart positions
Title	Album details	Peak chart positions	
Title	Album details	US Ind.	GER
The Least Worst of Type O Negative	Released: October 31, 2000; Label: Roadrunner; Formats: CD, digital download	4	50
The Best of Type O Negative	Released: September 12, 2006; Label: Roadrunner; Formats: CD	12	44
None More Negative	Released: November 25, 2011; Label: Roadrunner; Formats: LP box set	—	28
The Complete Roadrunner Collection 1991-2003	Released: November 14, 2012; Label: Roadrunner, Rhino; Formats: CD, digital download	7	90
"—" denotes a recording that did not chart or was not released in that territory.

=== Video albums ===
List of video albums
Title	Album details	Certifications
After Dark	Released: March 24, 1998; Label: Roadrunner; Formats: VHS, DVD	RIAA: Gold
Symphony for the Devil	Released: March 14, 2006; Label: Roadrunner; Formats: DVD	

== Singles ==
List of singles, with selected chart positions, showing year released, certifications and album name
Title	Year	Peak chart positions					Certifications	Album
Title	Year	US Main. Rock	FIN	GER	SWE	UK	Certifications	Album
"Christian Woman"	1993	—	—	—	—	—		Bloody Kisses
"My Girlfriend's Girlfriend"	1996	—	15	96	42	156		October Rust
"Love You to Death"	1996	—	—	—	—	—		October Rust
"Cinnamon Girl"	1997	—	—	—	—	—		October Rust
"Pictures of Matchstick Men" (with Ozzy Osbourne)	1997	—	—	—	—	—		Private Parts soundtrack
"Creepy Green Light"	1999	—	—	—	—	—		World Coming Down
"Everything Dies"	1999	37	—	—	—	97		World Coming Down
"I Don't Wanna Be Me"	2003	40	—	—	—	—	RIAA: Gold	Life Is Killing Me
"The Profit of Doom"	2007	—	—	—	—	—		Dead Again
"September Sun"	2008	—	—	—	—	—		Dead Again
"—" denotes a recording that did not chart or was not released in that territory.

=== Promotional singles ===
Title	Year	Album
"Unsuccessfully Coping with the Natural Beauty of Infidelity"	1991	Slow, Deep and Hard
"Black No. 1 (Little Miss Scare-All)"	1993	Bloody Kisses
"Summer Breeze"	1994	Bloody Kisses
"In Praise of Bacchus"	1996	October Rust
"Haunted"	1997	October Rust
"Everyone I Love Is Dead"	1999	World Coming Down

== Music videos ==
List of music videos, showing year released and director
Title	Year	Director(s)	Album
"Black No. 1 (Little Miss Scare-All)"	1993	Parris Mayhew	Bloody Kisses
"Christian Woman" (version 1)	1993	Jon Reiss	Bloody Kisses
"Christian Woman" (version 2)	1993	Peter Steele, Konrad Roman	Bloody Kisses
"Love You to Death"	1996	Chris Burns	October Rust
"My Girlfriend's Girlfriend"	1996	Jon Reiss	October Rust
"Cinnamon Girl"	1996	Thomas Mignone	October Rust
"Everything Dies"	1999	Michael Martin	World Coming Down
"I Don't Wanna Be Me"	2003	Nathan "Karma" Cox	Life Is Killing Me
"The Profit of Doom"	2007	Scott Sisti, Michael Saladino	Dead Again
"September Sun"	2007	Ivan Colic, Josip Colic	Dead Again
