= The Best of Type O Negative =

Greatest hits album by Type O Negative
- Released: September 12, 2006
- Recorded: 1991–2003
- Genre: Gothic metal, doom metal
- Length: 68:18
- Label: Roadrunner
- Producer: Peter Steele; Josh Silver

Type O Negative chronology
Life is Killing Me (2003)	The Best of Type O Negative (2006)	Dead Again (2007)

Professional ratings
Review scores
Source	Rating
Allmusic	4/5 stars

The Best of Type O Negative is an album from Roadrunner Records, featuring a collection of Type O Negative's music with the label. The album was released without Type O Negative's involvement (they were signed to SPV Records by the time of this compilation's release).

Songs from the albums The Origin of the Feces and then-new material from The Least Worst Of are not represented on the album. Despite being an unsanctioned release, the cover of Deep Purple's "Highway Star" does not appear on any other Type O Negative release and is exclusive to the compilation - with the exception of its previous inclusion on the compilation NASCAR: Crank It Up.

The album was released on September 12, 2006, simultaneously with similarly unsanctioned best-of collections of the bands Sepultura, Fear Factory, and Ill Niño.

== Track listing ==
All songs written by Peter Steele except where noted.

1. "Unsuccessfully Coping with the Natural Beauty of Infidelity" – 12:37
  - Originally from Slow, Deep and Hard (1991)
2. "Christian Woman" – 4:29
  - Edited version
  - Originally from Bloody Kisses (1993)
3. "Black No.1 (Little Miss Scare-All)" – 4:40
  - Edited version
  - Originally from Bloody Kisses (1993)
4. "Too Late: Frozen" – 7:53
  - Originally from Bloody Kisses (1993)
5. "Love You to Death" – 4:51
  - Edited version
  - Originally from October Rust (1996)
6. "My Girlfriend's Girlfriend" – 3:49
  - Originally from October Rust (1996)
7. "Cinnamon Girl" (Neil Young) – 4:08
  - Neil Young cover
  - Originally from October Rust (1996)
8. "Everyone I Love Is Dead" – 4:41
  - Edited version
  - Originally from World Coming Down (1999)
9. "Everything Dies" – 4:37
  - Edited version
  - Originally from World Coming Down (1999)
10. "Highway Star" (Ian Gillan, Ritchie Blackmore, Roger Glover, Jon Lord, Ian Paice) – 5:57
  - Deep Purple cover
  - Originally from NASCAR: Crank It Up (2002)
11. "I Don't Wanna Be Me" – 3:49
  - Edited version
  - Originally from Life Is Killing Me (2003)
12. "Life Is Killing Me" – 6:47
  - Originally from Life Is Killing Me (2003)

== Personnel ==
- Peter Steele - lead vocals, bass guitar, additional electric guitar & keyboards
- Kenny Hickey - backing vocals, co-lead vocals (on "Black No.1 (Little Miss Scare-All)" and "Highway Star"), acoustic guitar, electric guitar
- Josh Silver - backing vocals, keyboards, sound effects
- Sal Abruscato - drums, percussion (on tracks 1–4)
- Johnny Kelly - backing vocals, drums, percussion (on tracks 5–12)
