= Symphony for the Devil (Type O Negative album) =

Video by Type O Negative
- Released: March 14, 2006
- Recorded: 1999
- Genre: Gothic metal
- Length: 135:00
- Label: Steamhammer
- Producer: Peter Steele, Josh Silver

Symphony for the Devil is a live DVD by Type O Negative released on March 14, 2006. It is a video of a live concert at the Bizarre Festival in 1999, with a behind-the-scenes look at Type O Negative, an interview with the band, commentary, biographies of the band members and a collection of photographs.

The DVD was recorded on Sunday August 22, 1999, at the 12th Bizarre Festival in Cologne, Germany. This gig was originally recorded for a German live-in-concert program, WDR Rockpalast, and broadcast on German television. The band bought the live footage because it seemed to be the best one available to date regardless of the previous TV releases. Twelve cameras were used. The DVD does not have the performances of the cover songs "Back in the USSR" and "Day Tripper Medley" that were part of the live show and TV broadcast.

A bonus CD of the Dead Again album has five audio tracks from this show.

== Track listing ==
All songs written by Peter Steele except where noted.

=== DVD ===
1. "In the Flesh" (Roger Waters) Pink Floyd cover
2. "Cinnamon Girl" (Neil Young) Neil Young cover
3. "Too Late: Frozen"
4. "Waste of Life intro"
5. "In Praise of Bacchus"
6. "Kill All the White People" w/“Jesus Hitler” intro
7. "Cornucopia intro" (Ozzy Osbourne, Tony Iommi, Geezer Butler, Bill Ward) Black Sabbath cover
8. "Wolf Moon (Including Zoanthropic Paranoia)"
9. "Everything Dies"
10. "My Girlfriend's Girlfriend"
11. "Are You Afraid"
12. "Gravity"
13. "Black Sabbath intro" (Osbourne, Iommi, Butler, Ward) Black Sabbath cover
14. "Christian Woman"
15. "Love You to Death"
16. "Black No.1 (Little Miss Scare-All)"

=== CD ===
Included with the DVD was a CD single containing a medley of three Santana songs. The single was only available with the DVD and the song was not included in any other Type O Negative releases.

1. Santana Medley
  - "Evil Ways" (Clarence (Sonny) Henry)
  - "Oye Como Va" (Tito Puente)
  - "Black Magic Woman" (Peter Green)

== Personnel ==
- Peter Steele – lead vocals, bass guitar
- Kenny Hickey – backing vocals, co-lead vocals (on "Black No.1 (Little Miss Scare-All)" and "Santana Medley"), electric guitar
- Josh Silver – backing vocals, keyboards
- Johnny Kelly – drums, percussion
