= The Least Worst Of =

The Least Worst of

Compilation album by Type O Negative
- Released: June 21, 2000
- Recorded: 1989–1999
- Genre: Gothic metal
- Length: Unedited: 78:22; Edited: 66:45
- Label: Roadrunner
- Producer: Peter Steele, Josh Silver

Type O Negative chronology
World Coming Down (1999)	''The Least Worst of'' (2000)	Life Is Killing Me (2003)

Professional ratings
Review scores
Source	Rating
Allmusic	4/5 stars

The Least Worst of is a compilation album by American gothic metal band Type O Negative. It contains previously released material alongside a number of unreleased tracks and remixes. The album is available in an edited variant and an unedited one (with a Parental Advisory label/logo). The photograph on the album cover is of the defunct Parachute jump at Coney Island, in Brooklyn, New York.

Consistent with many of the band's previous "joke tracks", the first track, "The Misinterpretation of Silence and Its Disastrous Consequences (Wombs and Tombs Mix)", like the original is completely silent (the only semblance of remixing being that the track is shorter; 39 seconds of silence instead of the original's 1:04). The compilation's title also acts as an example of their self-deprecating sense of humour, with the logic that silence can actually be considered some of their best work.

== Track listing ==
=== Unedited version ===
1. "The Misinterpretation of Silence and Its Disastrous Consequences" (Wombs and Tombs Mix) – 0:39
  - Previously unreleased "remix". The original version can be found on Slow, Deep and Hard
2. "Everyone I Love Is Dead" – 4:39
  - Previously unreleased edit. The full-length version can be found on World Coming Down.
3. "Black No. 1 (Little Miss Scare-All)" – 4:34
  - Previously unreleased edit. The full length version can be found on Bloody Kisses.
4. "It's Never Enough" – 8:15
  - Previously unreleased studio recording, from the recording sessions of World Coming Down.
5. "Love You to Death" – 4:47
  - Edit taken from the 1996 European single Love You to Death. The full length version can be found on October Rust.
6. "Black Sabbath (From the Satanic Perspective)" (Ozzy Osbourne, Tony Iommi, Geezer Butler, Bill Ward) – 7:44
  - Taken from the 1996 European single My Girlfriend's Girlfriend. This cover originally appeared on the Black Sabbath tribute Nativity in Black under the song's original title, simply "Black Sabbath", and was sung with its original lyrics, but the version that appeared on "The Least Worst of" has Peter Steele's own lyrics, sung from the perspective of Satan.
7. "Christian Woman" – 4:25
  - Edit taken from the 1993 European single Christian Woman. The full length version can be found on Bloody Kisses.
8. "12 Black Rainbows" – 5:10
  - Taken from the 1999 European single Everything Dies, from the recording sessions of World Coming Down. The song revolves around non-sexual foreplay, relationship breakups, alcohol abuse, and heartache.
9. "My Girlfriend's Girlfriend" (Cheese Organ Mix) – 3:43
  - Previously unreleased alternate mix. The original version can be found on October Rust.
10. "Hey Pete" (Pete's Ego Trip Version) (Billy Roberts) – 5:19
  - Previously unreleased studio version. The faux live version can be found on The Origin of the Feces.
11. "Everything Dies" – 4:33
  - Edit taken from the 1999 European single Everything Dies, from the recording sessions of World Coming Down.
12. "Cinnamon Girl" (Depressed Mode Mix) (Neil Young) – 3:50
  - Taken from the 1997 U.S./European single Cinnamon Girl. The original version can be found on October Rust.
13. "Unsuccessfully Coping with the Natural Beauty of Infidelity" – 12:29
  - Taken from Slow Deep and Hard.
14. "Stay Out of My Dreams" – 8:15
  - Previously unreleased studio recording, from the recording sessions of World Coming Down.

=== Edited version ===
1. "The Misinterpretation of Silence and Its Disastrous Consequences" (Wombs And Tombs Mix) – 0:39
  - Previously unreleased remix. The original version can be found on Slow Deep and Hard
2. "Everyone I Love Is Dead" – 4:39
  - Previously unreleased edit. The full-length version can be found on World Coming Down.
3. "Black No. 1 (Little Miss Scare-All)" – 4:35
  - Previously unreleased edit. The full length version can be found on Bloody Kisses.
4. "Love You to Death" – 4:47
  - Edit taken from the 1996 European single Love You to Death. The full length version can be found on October Rust.
5. "Black Sabbath (From the Satanic Perspective)" (Osbourne, Iommi, Butler, Ward) – 7:44
  - Taken from the 1996 European single My Girlfriend's Girlfriend. This cover originally appeared on the Black Sabbath tribute Nativity in Black, but this version has Peter Steele's own lyrics, sung from the perspective of Lucifer.
6. "Christian Woman" – 4:25
  - Edit taken from the 1993 European single Christian Woman. The full length version can be found on Bloody Kisses.
7. "12 Black Rainbows" – 5:10
  - Taken from the 1999 European single Everything Dies, from the recording sessions of World Coming Down. The song revolves around non-sexual foreplay, relationship breakups, alcohol abuse, and heartache.
8. "My Girlfriend's Girlfriend" (Cheese Organ Mix) – 3:43
  - Previously unreleased alternate mix. The original version can be found on October Rust.
9. "Hey Pete" (Pete's Ego Trip version) (Roberts) – 5:19
  - Previously unreleased studio version. The faux live version can be found on The Origin of the Feces.
10. "Everything Dies" – 4:33
  - Edit taken from the 1999 European single Everything Dies, from the recording sessions of World Coming Down.
11. "Cinnamon Girl" (Depressed Mode Mix) (Young) – 3:52
  - Taken from the 1997 U.S./European single Cinnamon Girl. The original version can be found on October Rust.
12. "Gravitational Constant: G = 6.67 × 10^{−8} cm^{−3} gm^{−1} sec^{−2}" – 9:04
  - Taken from Slow Deep and Hard.
13. "Stay Out of My Dreams" – 8:15
  - Previously unreleased studio recording, from the recording sessions of World Coming Down.

== Personnel ==
- Peter Steele - lead vocals, bass guitar, additional electric guitar, additional keyboards
- Kenny Hickey - backing vocals, co-lead vocals (on "Black No.1 (Little Miss Scare-All)" and "Hey Pete"), acoustic guitar, electric guitar
- Josh Silver - backing vocals, keyboards, synthesizers, sound effects
- Sal Abruscato - backing vocals, drums, percussion (on "The Misinterpretation of Silence and Its Disastrous Consequences (Wombs and Tombs Mix)", "Black No.1 (Little Miss Scare-All)", "Christian Woman", "Hey Pete (Pete's Ego Trip Version)", "Unsuccessfully Coping With The Natural Beauty of Infidelity" and "Gravitational Constant: G = 6.67 × 10^{−8} cm^{−3} gm^{−1} sec^{−2}")
- Johnny Kelly - backing vocals, drums, percussion (on "Everyone I Love Is Dead", "It's Never Enough", "Love You to Death", "Black Sabbath (From the Satanic Perspective)", "12 Black Rainbows", "My Girlfriend's Girlfriend (Cheese Organ Mix)", "Everything Dies", "Cinnamon Girl (Depressed Mode Mix)" and "Stay Out of My Dreams")

== Charts ==
Year	Chart	Position
2000	The Billboard 200	99
