= After Dark (Type O Negative album) =

After Dark (Type O Negative)

Video by Type O Negative
- Released: March 24, 1998 (VHS); September 12, 2000 (DVD)
- Genre: Gothic metal
- Label: Roadrunner
- Director: Thomas Mignone

Professional ratings
Review scores
Source	Rating
Allmusic	3/5 stars

After Dark is a VHS/DVD release by the band Type O Negative, which was released in 1998 and 2000 (VHS and DVD respectively). This video contains live footage of the band performing on stage, back stage antics, music videos, and cynical humor. It also features an onstage food fight/altercation with the heavy metal band Pantera.

The cover art features an 1810 oil painting by Caspar David Friedrich titled The Abbey in the Oakwood.

== Track list ==
All songs written by Peter Steele except where noted.

1. "Black No. 1 (Little Miss Scare-All)"
2. "Christian Woman"
3. "My Girlfriend's Girlfriend"
4. "Love You to Death"
5. "Cinnamon Girl" (Neil Young)
  - Neil Young cover
6. "Christian Woman"
  - Naildriver version
7. "Everything Dies"
  - Bonus video

== Personnel ==
- Peter Steele – bass guitar, lead vocals
- Kenny Hickey – guitar, backing vocals, co-lead vocals on "Black No.1 (Little Miss Scare-All)"
- Josh Silver – keyboards, backing vocals
- Sal Abruscato – drums on track 1, 2 and 6
- Johnny Kelly – drums and backing vocals on tracks 3–5, 7
