= Dead Again (Type O Negative album) =

Studio album by Type O Negative
- Released: March 13, 2007
- Recorded: 2006–2007
- Studios: Systems Two, Brooklyn, New York; Sty in the Sky, Brooklyn, New York; Paul Bento's Studio
- Genres: Gothic metal; doom metal
- Length: 77:30 (original album); 42:58 (Best Buy exclusive disc)
- Label: Steamhammer
- Producers: Josh Silver, Peter Steele

Type O Negative chronology
Life Is Killing Me (2003)	Dead Again (2007)

Singles from Dead Again
- 1. "The Profit of Doom" Released: February 2007; 2. "September Sun" Released: January 14, 2008

Alternate cover
- Special edition cover

Dead Again (stylized as DЭДD ДGДIИ) is the seventh and final studio album by the American gothic metal band Type O Negative, released before the death of frontman Peter Steele in 2010 and subsequent dissolution of the band. It was released on March 13, 2007, through record label Steamhammer, a subsidiary of SPV.

== Recording ==
The band used studio drums instead of a drum machine for the first time since their third album, Bloody Kisses. Thus, it remains the only Type O Negative studio album with Johnny Kelly's actual playing, as he programmed artificial drums instead of recording with a physical drum kit on the three albums prior to Dead Again.

== Content ==
The cover photo is a portrayal of Grigori Rasputin, the Russian mystic and associate of Tsar Nicholas II. The lettering is in a faux-Cyrillic font.

The song "Halloween in Heaven" is a tribute to Dimebag Darrell, who was murdered on stage in 2004.

== Release ==
Professional ratings
Review scores
Source	Rating
AllMusic	3.5/5 stars
Blabbermouth.net	8/10
Chronicles of Chaos	9/10
MetalSucks	4/5
NME	ambiguous

Reception for Dead Again was mainly positive, and resulted in the band's highest ever chart positions. In the US, it debuted at No. 27 on the Billboard 200, selling 22,000 copies, only slightly less than Life is Killing Me.

The insert of the CD folds out into the shape of a cross with Rasputin's head at the top. The media tray has the words "Снова Мертвый" ("Dead Again") visible underneath along with Rasputin's autopsy information. The photograph on the back was taken in 1906, showing four young women of the Tsarist family, identified left to right as Grand Duchesses Olga, Tatiana, Maria and Anastasia Nikolaevna.

The bonus tracks were taken from the Symphony for the Devil live DVD. The album was re-released in February 2008, with a DVD including live performances, interviews, and music videos. A separate three-LP vinyl box set was also released that included several collector's items, such as a T-shirt, a 12-page booklet, and a DVD disc that contains the same live footage and music videos as the Best Buy exclusive DVD, an interview, and the entire album in MP3 format. Two of the vinyl discs are red and one is the standard black. The box itself comes in the red version of the cover art.

Since it was released under a different label, Dead Again is the only studio album to not be included in many of the band's compilation releases including 2013's The Complete Roadrunner Collection 1991 - 2003 and 2019's None More Negative boxset. And with Steamhammer's parent company SPV GmbH declaring bankrupt in 2009, many of the artists that had signed to the label were not able to rerelease their albums due to legal issues, including Dead Again. On August 20, 2021, the album was made available once again on Spotify and Apple Music through Nuclear Blast.

On March 13, 2022, it was announced that, for its 15th anniversary, Dead Again would be reissued on vinyl, CD, and cassette through Nuclear Blast Records. In addition to the standard version of the album, Nuclear Blast also released a special 2-Disc Limited Edition version of Dead Again which included a 10-track bonus disc. The bonus disc featured live material recorded by Type O Negative in 1999 and 2007.

== Track listing ==
All tracks are written by Peter Steele.

No.	Title	Length
1.	"Dead Again"	4:15
2.	"Tripping a Blind Man"	7:04
3.	"The Profit of Doom"	10:47
4.	"September Sun"	9:47
5.	"Halloween in Heaven"	4:50
6.	"These Three Things"	14:21
7.	"She Burned Me Down"	7:54
8.	"Some Stupid Tomorrow"	4:20
9.	"An Ode to Locksmiths"	5:15
10.	"Hail and Farewell to Britain"	8:57
Total length:		77:30

Best Buy exclusive bonus disc
No.	Title	Length
1.	"Everything Dies"/"My Girlfriend's Girlfriend"	9:49
2.	"Are You Afraid"/"Gravitational Constant"	7:14
3.	"Christian Woman" (labeled as "Christian Women" on the case; contains the "Black Sabbath" intro)	8:27
4.	"Love You to Death"	8:06
5.	"Black No.1 (Little Miss Scare-All)"	9:22
Total length:		42:58

Special edition bonus DVD
No.	Title	Length
1.	"Anesthesia" (live at Wacken Open Air 2007)	6:04
2.	"Christian Woman" (live at Wacken Open Air 2007)	7:59
3.	"Love You to Death" (live at Wacken Open Air 2007)	6:06
4.	"Kill You Tonight" (live at Wacken Open Air 2007)	9:50
5.	"The Profit of Doom" (music video)	4:32
6.	"September Sun" (music video)	4:32
Total length:		39:03

15th Anniversary Limited Edition Reissue Bonus CD (2022 Nuclear Blast Records)
No.	Title	Length
1.	"Everything Dies" (Live at the Bizarre Festival 1999)	6:06
2.	"My Girlfriend's Girlfriend" (Live at the Bizarre Festival 1999)	3:43
3.	"Are You Afraid/Gravitational Constant" (Live at the Bizarre Festival 1999)	7:14
4.	"Black Sabbath [intro] / Christian Woman" (Live at the Bizarre Festival 1999)	8:35
5.	"Love You To Death" (Live at the Bizarre Festival 1999)	7:16
6.	"Black No.1 (Little Miss Scare-All)" (Live at the Bizarre Festival 1999)	9:11
7.	"Anesthesia" (Live at Wacken Open Air 2007)	6:04
8.	"Christian Woman" (Live at Wacken Open Air 2007)	7:58
9.	"Love You To Death" (Live at Wacken Open Air 2007)	6:05
10.	"Kill You Tonight" (Live at Wacken Open Air 2007)	9:47
Total length:		72:05

== Personnel ==
Type O Negative

- Peter Steele – lead vocals, bass guitar, arrangements, production
- Kenny Hickey – guitar, backing vocals, co-lead vocals (on "The Profit Of Doom", “September Sun”, "Halloween in Heaven", "These Three Things", "Some Stupid Tomorrow" and "An Ode to Locksmiths")
- Josh Silver – keyboards, synthesizers, sound effects, backing vocals, arrangements, production, recording, mixing, engineering, mastering
- Johnny Kelly – drums, arrangements

Additional personnel

- The Bensonhoist Lesbian Choir (actually the band members themselves) – backing vocals
- Tara VanFlower – backing vocals (on "Halloween in Heaven")
- Paul Bento – electronic programming and tamboura (on "The Profit of Doom")

Technical personnel

- Mike Marciano – mastering
- Paul Bento – engineering (on additional recordings)

== Charts ==
Chart (2007)	Peak position
Austrian Albums (Ö3 Austria)	25
Belgian Albums (Ultratop Flanders)	97
Danish Albums (Hitlisten)	37
Dutch Albums (Album Top 100)	38
Finnish Albums (Suomen virallinen lista)	5
French Albums (SNEP)	161
German Albums (Offizielle Top 100)	18
Norwegian Albums (VG-lista)	34
Swedish Albums (Sverigetopplistan)	39
Swiss Albums (Schweizer Hitparade)	89
UK Albums (Official Charts)	87
US Billboard 200	27
