= September Sun =

2008 song by Type O Negative

Single by Type O Negative

from the album Dead Again
- Released: January 14, 2008
- Recorded: 2006
- Genre: Gothic metal
- Length: 4:35 (single version); 9:47 (album version)
- Label: Steamhammer Records/SPV
- Songwriter: Peter Steele
- Producers: Peter Steele, Kenny Hickey, Josh Silver, Johnny Kelly

Type O Negative singles chronology
"The Profit of Doom" (2007)	"September Sun" (2008)

"September Sun" is a single by gothic metal band Type O Negative from the 2007 album Dead Again. The nearly ten minute song was edited to just 4½ minutes for the single release. The single was released on January 14, 2008, ten months after the album's release on March 13, 2007. "September Sun" was the band's final single released before the passing of frontman Peter Steele.

== Writing and inspiration ==
Peter Steele dreamt about what would happen if he was haunted in bright sunshine, so he proposed the song titled "September Sun." He began writing this song featuring melancholy lyrics about the dead, doom, and sadness, beginning the first line of lyrics with the song title. The song and the lyrics give inspiration about being depressed without being dark, which gives way to hope and reminisce, like experiencing the first sunset after sorrow or bereavement.

== Composition and peripherals ==
Josh Silver plays the piano to begin the song while Peter Steele sings. The piano section sounds similar to songs featured on another Type O Negative album October Rust, hence the third line of lyrics beginning with the words 'October's Rust.' Kenny Hickey sings the heavier part while he plays the guitar. On the album version, the final section has an airy ending, followed by a constant line of repeated notes from a synthesizer while alternating between high and low notes in the downward trend, signifying the end of the song with a backmasked message by Steele. The message is from a voicemail left on a friend's answering machine in 1998. However, on the single version, the symphonic section simply fades to end it.

== Video ==
A video was released for the radio version of the song. It was shot in October 2007 and was directed by Ivan and Josip Colic. The video tells a story of an unhappy couple interchanged with shots of Type O Negative performing the song on a roof. A woman leaves her man, he remains still haunted by their bygone love and eventually attempts suicide by jumping off the roof, but is stopped at the last moment.

== Personnel ==
- Peter Steele - lead vocals, bass guitar
- Kenny Hickey - co-lead vocals, backing vocals, electric guitar
- Josh Silver - backing vocals, keyboards, sound effects
- Johnny Kelly - drums, percussion
