= The Profit of Doom =

2007 song by Type O Negative

"Profits of Doom"

Single by Type O Negative

from the album Dead Again
- B-side: "Profits of Doom (Album Version)"
- Released: February 2007
- Recorded: 2006
- Genre: Doom metal; gothic rock
- Length: 4:33 (single version); 10:47 (album version)
- Label: Steamhammer Records/SPV
- Songwriter: Peter Steele
- Producers: Peter Steele, Kenny Hickey, Josh Silver, Johnny Kelly

Type O Negative singles chronology
"I Don't Wanna Be Me" (2003)	"Profits of Doom" (2007)	"September Sun" (2008)

"The Profit of Doom" (renamed to "Profits of Doom" when released as a single) is a song by American gothic metal band Type O Negative, released in February 2007 as the lead single from their seventh studio album, Dead Again. The single version of the song is four minutes and 33 seconds long, but lasts nearly 11 minutes on the album. A music video was released for the song.

The song begins with slow, heavy riffs, with a chorus in the style of King Crimson before some additional doom metal riffs, and ending with a doom metal solo. The lyrics refer to the asteroid 99942 Apophis; which, at that time, was said to have a possibility of hitting the Earth on Friday, April 13, 2029.

== Track listing ==
All tracks are written by Peter Steele.

No.	Title	Length
1.	"Profits of Doom" (Radio Edit)	4:33
2.	"Profits of Doom" (Album Version)	10:51
Total length:		15:24

== Personnel ==
- Peter Steele - lead vocals, bass
- Kenny Hickey - backing vocals, guitars
- Josh Silver - backing vocals, keyboards, sound effects
- Johnny Kelly - drums
