= Saint Avangeline =

American singer-songwriter (born 2002)

- Born: Adeline Troutman; September 28, 2002 (age 24); Tampa, Florida, U.S.
- Occupations: Singer-songwriter; model
- Years active: 2020–present
- Works: Gardener of Eden (2022), Inferno (2024)
- Musical career
- Genres: indie pop; dream pop; alternative pop; darkwave; metal; screamo
- Instruments: Vocals
- Website: saintavangelinemusic.com

Adeline Troutman (born September 28, 2002), known professionally as Saint Avangeline, is an American singer-songwriter and model. She became known for her dark and ethereal alternative pop and dream pop-style music and lyrics inspired by gothic aesthetics and artistic and literary influences. She has released two albums, Inferno (2024) and Gardener of Eden (2022), which contained the viral single "Lilith".

== Early life ==
Adeline Troutman was born in Tampa, Florida, and grew up in Atlanta, Georgia. Her family is of partial Syrian and Lebanese heritage. She was raised Presbyterian until the age of 10, but now identifies as spiritual. She graduated from Marietta High School before attending Georgia State University.

== Career ==
Saint Avangeline began her career by making music on her laptop computer and uploading it to YouTube and SoundCloud. She first gained popularity for her covers of Lana Del Rey songs, flipping the gender of the songs’ love interests to female to reflect her lesbian identity. She released her first album, Gardener of Eden, in 2022, which contained the single “Lilith”, which subsequently went viral on TikTok and Instagram, gaining over 56 million streams. This haunting track explored her experience of toxic relationships and sexual assault using the biblical character of Lilith as a symbol for both beauty and danger. Saint shared that she wrote “Lilith” “to try to cope and heal, and since then, my inspiration has mostly come from a desperate place of trying to get everything out of my system.” In 2023, she released the song “Every Girl Gets Her Wish”, which was a cover of the unreleased Lana Del Rey song “Every Man Gets His Wish”, and received over 13 million streams. The next year, in 2024, she released her sophomore album, Inferno. In this album, her musical style explored new influences such as metal and screamo. In 2025 Saint released a variety of singles including “Limerance”, an ethereal track with themes of deadly desire and destruction, “Carolina Creature”, a haunting song based on a past abusive relationship, “Rain Dance”, a dreamy and cinematic track, and covers of Madonna's “Frozen” and Type O Negative's “Love You to Death”.

In 2025, she collaborated with Adam Bravin, of She Wants Revenge, to form the duo “The Death of Lilies”. They released the single “Savior”, a cinematic darkwave song with gothic influences based on a character from Dungeons and Dragons lore.

In October 2025, Saint Avangeline embarked on her Mortal Genesis Tour, playing two shows, one at The Roxy in Los Angeles on the 19th and one at The Meadows in Brooklyn on the 26th.

== Artisty and influences ==
Saint Avangeline's music is distinctive for its blending of ethereal and dreamy sounds with raw, emotional vocals and lyrics, often reflecting her personal experiences with mental health, growing up queer, and domestic abuse. She has stated that “Most songs are like a diary for me,” explaining that “Exploring my mental health struggles. Trauma, intense feelings. Like sucking the poison out.” In an interview with Ones To Watch she said "My main audience that I started making my music for was other queer women.", because growing up she lacked that kind of representation.

Her work also takes inspiration from her Southern upbringing as well as art, religion, and literature, such as the gothic movement, 19th-century poetry, the work of Dante Alighieri, and the Pre-Raphaelite Brotherhood. Saint said of her writing process that “Inspiration is fueled by an intense emotion that I cannot shake,” and “Lyrics are written in a stream of consciousness within a very short sitting, 20 minutes. The composition and vocals are not different, and usually are completed within a day.”

== Personal life ==
Saint Avangeline has chromesthesia, a type of synesthesia where certain sounds evoke the perception of certain colors. This unique condition has greatly influenced her visual presentations and songwriting, sharing that for her, "all of my songs work within a color palette in my head". She also takes inspiration from her experiences living with Bipolar disorder, ADHD, and PTSD in her music.

She is a lesbian, and her experiences growing up queer in the American South have served as an inspiration for her work.
