= Life Is Killing Me =

Studio album by Type O Negative
- Released: June 17, 2003
- Studios: Systems Two, Brooklyn, New York
- Genre: Gothic metal
- Length: 74:30
- Label: Roadrunner
- Producers: Josh Silver; Peter Steele

Type O Negative chronology
World Coming Down (1999)	Life Is Killing Me (2003)	Dead Again (2007)

Singles from Life Is Killing Me
- 1. "I Don't Wanna Be Me" Released: 2003

Life Is Killing Me is the sixth studio album by gothic metal band Type O Negative. It was released on June 17, 2003, and was their final studio album released through record label Roadrunner Records.

The album's title and content refers primarily to frontman Peter Steele's dissatisfied life outlook and experiences with mental illness at the time of writing and production, with lyrics concerning relationship problems and the illness and death of his parents.

The album reached No. 39 on the US Billboard 200 chart, selling 27,000 copies in its first week, and received positive reviews from music critics, who noted a more melodic sound in comparison to previous records. "I Don't Wanna Be Me" was released as a promotional single, for which a music video was produced.

== Recording ==
Life Is Killing Me was recorded at Systems Two Recording Studio in Brooklyn, New York.

Vocalist and bassist Peter Steele used a custom Fernandes Tremor bass guitar for the recording of the album, an instrument which was built to his exact specifications under his sponsorship with the company.

This is the last album by the band to make use of a drum machine and contained no live drums, which had previously been used on October Rust and World Coming Down; the band's next and final studio album, Dead Again, would feature live drums again.

== Content ==
Describing the inspiration behind the title and theme of the record, Steele responded in an interview: "I guess I am going through some sort of midlife crisis being 41 years old now. And all the things I took for granted, my health, my life, people I love dying, people I loved walking away. I was with a girlfriend for 10 years but she left. It is like my dreams are dead." The album's title was originally going to be The Dream Is Dead.

The album contains a cover of the song "Angry Inch" from the off-Broadway musical Hedwig and the Angry Inch. The track "Thir13teen" is a cover of music featured in the TV show The Munsters.

=== Lyrical themes ===
Billboard described the record's lyrical themes as "infidelity, death and depression".

"Todd's Ship Gods (Above All Things)" was written by Steele about his father.

"I Like Goils" is described by Steele as "poking fun at PC" (political correctness), with lyrics centered on Steele's frustration with having homosexual men make sexual advances towards him following his 1995 Playgirl photoshoot. At the time of posing for the magazine, Steele was unaware of the primary demographic of the readership, and several unwanted advances from men had followed.

The album's title track further references Steele's father's death, while "Nettie" was written about his mother.

=== Musical style ===
AllMusic wrote "guitarist Kenny Hickey's passages have grown increasingly melodic, and the keys of Josh Silver possess a timeless melancholy" despite "how bleak or odd the lyrical proceedings get". Loudwire described it as "the most uplifting sounding album of their career".

== Release ==
Professional ratings
Review scores
Source	Rating
AllMusic	4/5 stars
Alternative Press	3/5
Chronicles of Chaos	8/10
Drowned in Sound	6/10
Exclaim!	favorable
Metal Hammer	8/10

Life Is Killing Me was leaked onto the internet before release, upsetting keyboard player Josh Silver to the point that he released a message online complaining that the leak essentially took revenue from the band. The album was officially released on June 17, 2003, on CD as well as cassette in some regions. In Europe, the album was also released with a bonus CD.

The album would not see a proper vinyl release until the None More Negative box set in 2011, followed by a 20th anniversary pressing of the record in 2023.

The album reached No. 39 on the US Billboard 200 chart.

The album was favorably received by music critics. Exclaim! wrote "Life Is Killing Me pays tongue-in-cheek homage to the world and the women that have screwed Steele over so badly. But musically, the disc is pure pop-rock bliss."

"(We Were) Electrocute" was featured on the soundtrack to the 2003 horror film Freddy vs. Jason.

== Legacy ==
"I Don't Wanna Be Me" was covered by European death metal band Meridian Dawn for their debut 2014 release The Mixtape. The song was later covered by Trivium.

== Track listing ==
All tracks are written by Peter Steele, except where noted.

No.	Title	Writer(s)	Length
1.	"Thir13teen"	Jack Marshall	1:07
2.	"I Don't Wanna Be Me"		5:09
3.	"Less Than Zero (<0)"		5:25
4.	"Todd's Ship Gods (Above All Things)"		4:11
5.	"I Like Goils"		2:35
6.	"...A Dish Best Served Coldly"		7:13
7.	"How Could She?"		7:35
8.	"Life Is Killing Me"		6:35
9.	"Nettie"		4:46
10.	"(We Were) Electrocute"		6:39
11.	"IYDKMIGTHTKY (Gimme That)"		6:20
12.	"Angry Inch"	Stephen Trask	3:39
13.	"Anesthesia"		6:41
14.	"Drunk in Paris"		1:27
15.	"The Dream Is Dead"		5:07
Total length:			74:30

Europe bonus disc
No.	Title	Writer(s)	Length
1.	"Out of the Fire (Kane's Theme)"	James A. Johnston	3:24
2.	"Christian Woman (Butt-Kissing Sell-Out Version)"		4:27
3.	"Suspended in Dusk"		8:39
4.	"Blood & Fire (Out of the Ashes Mix)"		4:36
5.	"Black Sabbath"	Ozzy Osbourne, Tony Iommi, Geezer Butler, Bill Ward	7:47
6.	"Cinnamon Girl (Extended Depression Mix)"	Neil Young	3:53
7.	"Haunted (Per Version)"		11:47
Total length:			44:33

== Personnel ==
Type O Negative

- Peter Steele – lead vocals, bass guitar, additional electric guitar and keyboards
- Kenny Hickey – guitar, backing vocals, co-lead vocals (on "...A Dish Best Served Coldly", "How Could She?", "Life Is Killing Me" and "Angry Inch"),
- Josh Silver – keyboards
- Johnny Kelly – drum programming, backing vocals

Additional personnel

- The Bensonhoist Lesbian Choir (actually the band members themselves) – backing vocals
- Paul Bento – sitar (on "Less Than Zero (<0)"), tamboura, drum machine (on "Less Than Zero (<0)", "Electrocute (We Were)" and "Anesthesia"), lead guitar (on "How Could She?")
- Pandit Kinnar K. Seen – tabla (on "Less Than Zero (<0)")
- Sal Abruscato – backing vocals (on "I Like Goils")

Technical personnel

- Mike Marciano – engineering, mixing
- George Marino – mastering
- Rebecca Waterfall – sleeve design
- Daniel Moss – sleeve photography

== Charts ==
Chart (2003)	Peak position
Austrian Albums (Ö3 Austria)	51
Dutch Albums (Album Top 100)	46
Finnish Albums (Suomen virallinen lista)	5
French Albums (SNEP)	97
German Albums (Offizielle Top 100)	9
Swedish Albums (Sverigetopplistan)	51
Swiss Albums (Schweizer Hitparade)	98
UK Albums (Official Charts)	87
US Billboard 200	39

Chart (2024)	Peak position
Croatian International Albums (HDU)	4
Hungarian Physical Albums (MAHASZ)	28
