= Fallout (band) =

American heavy metal band

- Origin: Brooklyn, New York, U.S.
- Genre: Heavy metal
- Years active: 1979–1982
- Label: Silver Records
- Past members: Peter Steele; Josh Silver; John Campos; Louie Beateaux

Fallout was an American heavy metal band formed in 1979 based in Brooklyn, New York City. The band’s members included Peter Steele (then billed under his birth name, Peter Ratajczyk) on bass and vocals, Josh Silver on keyboards, John Campos on guitars and drummer Louie Beateaux (then billed as Lou Beato).

Fallout released only one recording, the "Rock Hard" 7" single, released in 1981 on Silver Records and limited to 500 copies. This record was produced by Richard Termini and William Wittman.

After three years of steady gigging, Fallout broke up. Steele and Beateaux went on to form Carnivore, and Silver and Campos formed Original Sin. After the breakup of Original Sin, Campos went on to form his own production company: Powerhouse Entertainment Group, Inc. Campos recorded, produced, and wrote songs for many independent and major label artists, such as Bret Reilly, Surfing Moses, Jennifer Marks, Alex Skolnick, the Tito Puente band, Jimmy Delgado, Fat Joe, Mink, and more. He now runs a studio and production company out of Astoria, New York called One Mind Music. Beateaux later drummed for Agnostic Front, while Steele and Silver founded Type O Negative.

== Past members ==
- Peter Steele – bass, vocals
- John Campos – guitars
- Louie Beateaux – drums
- Josh Silver – keyboards

== Discography ==
- Untitled 7" single (1981)

Other known songs that were recorded at Soundscape are "Parthenophagia", "Fallout", "Under the Wheels", "Executioner", "Bleed for Me" and an assortment of instrumental 'experiments' none of which have officially been released nor bootlegged. Fallout also recorded the first version of the 'World War Three' Soundscape as an introduction to the song "Fallout". This piece includes synthesized explosions, gunfire and sirens performed by Richard Termini on the Oberheim Two Voice synthesizer and recorded to analog tape. The Soundscape includes screams and death cries performed by the band, the roadies and their girlfriends. This 'World War Three' Soundscape was recreated by Termini for the band Carnivore and is on the self-titled album Carnivore (1985).

=== Track listing ===
==== Untitled 7" single ====
1. "Rock Hard" (side A)
2. "Batteries Not Included" (side B)
