= I Don't Wanna Be Me =

Single by Type O Negative

from the album Life Is Killing Me
- Released: 2003
- Recorded: 2002
- Genre: Alternative metal; gothic metal; punk rock; thrash metal
- Length: 5:09 (album version); 3:44 (edit)
- Label: Roadrunner
- Songwriter: Peter Steele

Type O Negative singles chronology
| "Everything Dies" (1999) | "I Don't Wanna Be Me" (2003) | "The Profit of Doom" (2007) |

"I Don't Wanna Be Me" is a song by American gothic metal band Type O Negative. It is the second track on the band's sixth studio album, Life Is Killing Me (2003), and was released as a promo single the same year. Contrary to the gothic-influenced doom metal style of the band's other songs, "I Don't Wanna Be Me" is often considered a punk rock and thrash metal song.

== Content ==
Kerrang! described the song as "a highly-energised, sarcastic paean to self-hatred, waving a middle finger in their own faces as much as anyone else’s", noticing an influence of "old school catchy punk rock [...] At times, it even recalls the glorious heads down thrash attack of Peter’s previous band, the controversial Carnivore". Loudwire described the song as "goth-punk-power-pop".

On the song's lyrics, guitarist Kenny Hickey claims frontman Peter Steele's lyrics for the song were autobiographical: "At the time, Peter [...] wasn’t really doing too well, health-wise. He was getting sick of addictions and sick of life, hence the title, I Don't Wanna Be Me. He didn't wanna be Pete anymore." Hickey also noted that the song — an unusually simple, fast song by the band's standards — was written in response to his frustration with Steele's usual complex, multi-part arrangements.

== Track listing ==
| No. | Title | Length |
|---|---|---|
| 1. | "I Don't Wanna Be Me" (Edit) | 3:44 |

== Music video ==
The music video for the song features actor Dan Fogler, who dresses up as numerous different celebrities, including Marilyn Monroe, Michael Jackson, Britney Spears, Eminem, as well as frontman Steele himself.

== Release ==
"Life Is Killing Me" reached No. 38 on Billboard's Active Rock chart.

== Legacy ==
"I Don't Wanna Be Me" was covered by European death metal band Meridian Dawn for their debut 2014 release The Mixtape. The song was later covered by Trivium, and was released as a 7" split single with Type O Negative's original recording for Record Store Day 2018.

In 2018 metal magazine Kerrang! ranked the song at No. 4 in its retrospective list of the band's top 13 songs, describing it as "probably the finest of all the fast-paced songs in their arsenal".

The opening two seconds of guitar feedback and drum startup on "I Don't Wanna Be Me" is sampled and heard frequently on the Liberty Rock Radio station in the video game Grand Theft Auto IV.

The song has been covered by the English shoegaze band Split Chain.

== Certifications ==
| Region | Certification | Certified units/sales |
|---|---|---|
| United States (RIAA) | Gold | 500,000^{‡} |
^{‡} Sales+streaming figures based on certification alone.
