= World Coming Down =

Studio album by Type O Negative
- Released: September 21, 1999
- Genres: Gothic metal; doom metal
- Length: 73:58
- Label: Roadrunner
- Producers: Peter Steele and Josh Silver

Type O Negative chronology
October Rust (1996)	World Coming Down (1999)	The Least Worst Of (2000)

Singles from World Coming Down
- 1. "Everything Dies" Released: November 1999

World Coming Down is the fifth studio album by the American gothic metal band Type O Negative. Released on September 21, 1999, it is considered to be the darkest of the band's releases, having been written after a series of deaths in frontman Peter Steele's family, combined with the desire to break away from the sexually charged themes of the previous albums. It was also the band's first album to reach the Top 40 on the Billboard 200.

== Music and lyrics ==
As with the band's previous album, October Rust, this album also has a 'joke intro': in this case, "Skip It", 11 seconds of staccato band noise meant to sound as if the listener's CD player is skipping, followed by the band's guitarist, Kenny Hickey, shouting "Sucker!" On the 2019 and 2021 vinyl reissues of the album, this is instead replaced with 11 seconds of the first song, "White Slavery" skipping, as if the record is scratched, before Hickey yells "Sucker!". Contrary to popular belief, cassette versions contained the same intro as the CD version.

"White Slavery" itself deals with cocaine addiction. Discussing his dalliance with the drug and inspiration behind the song in a 1999 Kerrang! interview, Steele recalled: "There were a handful of times that were fucking horrible, but one night in particular was really bad, and that's when I stopped doing it. I was really depressed and homesick, and the worst part is when you're coming down from it. It's five in the morning and there's no one to talk to, you're on a tour bus doing 80mph and you look out the window and it looks like you're on Mars. All I could think about was jumping out of the bus while it was moving, but that would have made too many people happy."

Two other songs, "Everyone I Love Is Dead" and "Everything Dies", touch on the difficulties of watching family members and loved ones die. Another track, "Who Will Save the Sane?", which deals with mental illness and psychiatry, incorporates Steele reciting the number pi to 9 decimal places (3.141592653).

The album contains three "soundscape" tracks, which are named after internal organs, as segues between songs. Each of these songs is intended to suggest the possibilities of the deaths the members of the band may have suffered at the time: "Sinus" as death from cocaine use, "Liver" as death through alcohol abuse and "Lung" as death from smoking. In an ironic foreboding, Steele once told a close friend that he could not bear to listen to "Sinus" after it was mixed and completed, because the sound of the heartbeat escalating to its furious pace after the cocaine-snorting sound effect actually drove him to the point of an anxiety attack because of its realism.

Also included at the end of the album is a cover song, a medley of three Beatles songs. In the liner notes to the album's 2020 vinyl reissue, Hickey stated "All four of us are Beatles freaks" but added ruefully: "Being four idiots and not knowing anything, we didn't realise that The Beatles charge $35,000 per song. They were the most expensive songs in the music industry that you could get rights to for a cover - and we did a medley, so it was three songs! It came out great, but the record company was like, 'This is gonna cost $75,000! You guys are outta your minds! Who's gonna pay it? Not us!'" Keyboardist and producer Josh Silver eventually convinced the label to foot the bill.

An additional song recorded during the album sessions, "12 Black Rainbows," was issued as the B-side for the "Everything Dies" single; later, it was included on the compilation album The Least Worst Of with two other unreleased tracks from the same sessions ("It's Never Enough" and "Stay Out of My Dreams").

The reversed vocal technique of backmasking is used in several places on the album; some segments are more audibly apparent than others. In particular, backmasking during the intro section of "Creepy Green Light", which was originally titled "Spooky Green Light", refers to a third-person "spell" of a friend's intention to be reunited with a dead spouse.

Following its release the members of Type O Negative had mixed opinions about the music on World Coming Down. Keyboardist and producer Josh Silver felt that the music was strong, while Steele said the songs were too strongly connected to an uncomfortable period in his life. Live shows performed since the initial tour to support World Coming Down usually had very few, if any, selections from the album in the set list. However, the band often played the song "World Coming Down" in its entirety during the Dead Again tour.

The album cover features a photo of the Brooklyn Bridge.

== Critical reception ==
Professional ratings
Review scores
Source	Rating
AllMusic	4/5 stars
Christgau's Consumer Guide	(choice cut)
Chronicles of Chaos	10/10
Collector's Guide to Heavy Metal	8/10
The Daily Vault	B

World Coming Down received mostly positive reviews. AllMusic critic Steve Huey gave the album a 4-out-of-5 star rating. Adam Wasylyk of Chronicles of Chaos gave World Coming Down a very positive review: "An album that won't be ignored, it's my favourite album of 1999. Hands down." Christopher Thelen of The Daily Vault called the album "a great listen" and wrote that "for the most part", World Coming Down "suggests that" Type O Negative "is doing things right".

The Washington Post's Mark Jenkins wrote that Type O Negative "...shows some unexpected warmth" on the album, adding that "Much of the album thuds and growls, but the refrain of "Pyretta Blaze" is genuinely catchy." Writing for the Daily Herald (Arlington Heights), Jeff Pizek awarded the album three-and-a-half stars out of a possible four, asserting that with the album “the self-proclaimed Drab Four have found a dour medium between tenebrous melody and Sabbathy bad vibes.” Pizek paid special attention to a number of songs; he described “White Slavery” and “All Hallow’s Eve” as perfect bookends for the record and as “definitive Type O Negative songs, [that encompass] all the gloom, rage and tranquillity of their paradigm." He goes further, writing that “Pyretta Blaze” and “Creepy Green Light” showcase the varying sides of the band's personality by boasting crushing doom riffs and poppier sensibilities akin to October Rust, respectively. Pizek later added in his review that “In a just world, this would be the album that breaks Type O Negative, but that remains to be seen.”

In 2021, it was named one of the 20 best metal albums of 1999 by Metal Hammer magazine.

== Track listing ==
All songs written by Peter Steele, except where noted.

No.	Title	Length
1.	"Skip It"	0:11
2.	"White Slavery"	8:22
3.	"Sinus"	0:53
4.	"Everyone I Love Is Dead"	6:11
5.	"Who Will Save the Sane?"	6:41
6.	"Liver"	1:42
7.	"World Coming Down"	11:10
8.	"Creepy Green Light"	7:00
9.	"Everything Dies"	7:44
10.	"Lung"	1:36
11.	"Pyretta Blaze"	7:01
12.	"All Hallows Eve"	8:36
13.	"Day Tripper (Medley)" (The Beatles cover): I. Day Tripper (John Lennon, Paul McCartney); II. If I Needed Someone (George Harrison); III. Day Tripper (Reprise); IV. I Want You (She's So Heavy) (Lennon, McCartney)	7:02
Total length:		73:58

== Personnel ==
=== Type O Negative ===
- Peter Steele – lead vocals, bass, additional guitars and keyboards
- Kenny Hickey – guitars, backing vocals, co-lead vocals (on "World Coming Down" and "All Hallows Eve")
- Josh Silver – keyboards, synthesizers, sound effects, drum programming, backing vocals
- Johnny Kelly – drum programming, backing vocals

=== Additional musicians ===
- Paul Bento – sitar, tamboura (on "World Coming Down" and "Day Tripper (Medley)")
- Richard Termini – additional keyboards (on "Pyretta Blaze")

=== Production ===
- Michael Marciano – recording engineer
- George Marino – mastering
- Vincent Soyez – photography
- Mike Curry – design
- Noel Wiggins – design

== Charts ==
Chart (1999–2013)	Peak position
Austrian Albums (Ö3 Austria)	17
Dutch Albums (Album Top 100)	25
Europe (European Top 100 Albums)	8
Finnish Albums (Suomen virallinen lista)	3
German Albums (Offizielle Top 100)	3
Norwegian Albums (VG-lista)	16
Swedish Albums (Sverigetopplistan)	17
UK Albums (Official Charts)	49
US Billboard 200	39
