= The Origin of the Feces =

Studio album of re-recorded songs by Type O Negative
- Released: May 12, 1992
- Recorded: October 31, 1991
- Studios: Systems Two, Brooklyn, New York
- Genres: Crossover thrash; doom metal; gothic metal
- Length: 43:28
- Label: Roadrunner
- Producers: P. T. Barnum, Peter Steele, Josh Silver

Type O Negative chronology
Slow, Deep and Hard (1991)	The Origin of the Feces (1992)	Bloody Kisses (1993)

Reissue cover

Professional ratings
Review scores
Source	Rating
AllMusic	2/5 stars
Collector's Guide to Heavy Metal	5/10
Q	3/5 stars

The Origin of the Feces is the second studio album by the American gothic metal band Type O Negative, released in 1992.

== Recording and production ==
Despite the liner notes indicating the album was produced by P.T. Barnum and recorded live on Halloween at Brighton Beach in Brooklyn, the album was actually produced by Silver/Steele and recorded at Systems Two Recording Studio in Brooklyn, NY. This is the same studio the band utilized to record all of their studio albums. Crowd noise, stage banter and artificial audience interactions (including a supposed bomb threat interrupting the set) were added to give the illusion that the album was recorded live. The "audience interactions" were meant to humorously reenact real events the band faced during the controversial European leg of their Slow, Deep and Hard tour. Type O Negative often weaves this type of self deprecating humor into their often gloomy music.

== Album content ==
The album is composed primarily of reworked, re-recorded versions of tracks that previously appeared on the band's debut album, Slow, Deep and Hard. The previously released songs are listed under new, alternate titles on The Origin of the Feces' packaging and liner notes: "Unsuccessfully Coping with the Natural Beauty of Infidelity" was retitled "I Know You're Fucking Someone Else", "Gravitational Constant: G = 6.67 × 10^{−8} cm^{−3} gm^{−1} sec^{−2}" was renamed "Gravity", "Prelude to Agony" is listed as "Pain" and "Xero Tolerance" became "Kill You Tonight".

Another track, "Are You Afraid", is a brand new, original composition that the band performed as an introduction to "Gravity" during their live shows but had yet to include on an official studio album. It foreshadowed the "gothic" sound that the band would adopt on their 1993 followup, Bloody Kisses.

This album also started the tradition of Type O Negative recording cover songs performed in their distinct, gothic metal sound. The album included the band's cover of Billy Roberts' "Hey Joe" which was made famous by the Jimi Hendrix Experience. The song was retitled "Hey Pete" for its inclusion on The Origin Of The Feces and it featured re-worked lyrics. The new title and revised lyrics were references to Type O Negative frontman Peter Steele. The reprise of "Kill You Tonight" includes a sample of the closing piano strike from The Beatles' "A Day in the Life". The remastered 1994 reissue of The Origin Of The Feces also included a bonus cover track of Black Sabbath's "Paranoid" (which also contains the main riff of Black Sabbath's "Iron Man" midway through). This cover was originally recorded for inclusion on the 1994 compilation album "Nativity in Black: A Tribute to Black Sabbath" however it was scrapped from the project when Megadeth signed on and requested they perform "Paranoid" on the album. As a result, Type O Negative was forced to record another Black Sabbath song in order to be included on the tribute album. The band settled on the song "Black Sabbath" instead, and Black Sabbath themselves were very impressed with Type O Negative's take on the song. Original Black Sabbath drummer, Bill Ward, cited Type O Negative's performance as his favorite from the album.

In another instance of the band's sense of humor, circus impresario P. T. Barnum is credited as a co-producer for the record, despite the fact that he had been dead for over 100 years at the time the album was released.

== Packaging ==
The original cover of the album has a close-up of Steele's anus including a feces-scented scratch and sniff square. This was changed for the reissue two years later, to a green and black version of the 1493 Michael Wolgemut painting The Dance of Death. The album's title is a play on Charles Darwin's On the Origin of Species. Metal Hammer included the original cover on their list of "50 most hilariously ugly rock and metal album covers ever".

== Track listing ==
All lyrics and music by Peter Steele, except where noted.

No.	Title	Length
1.	"I Know You're Fucking Someone Else": I. "Anorganic Transmutogenesis (Synthetic Division)"; II. "Coitus Interruptus"; III. "I Know You're Fucking Someone Else"	15:02: 5:46; 2:20; 6:56
2.	"Are You Afraid?"	2:13
3.	"Gravity": I. "Unjustifiable Existence"; II. "Gravitational Acceleration (Due to Gravity)"; III. "Antimatter: Electromechanical Psychedelicosis"	7:13: 2:05; 3:19; 1:49
4.	"Pain": I. "Jackhammerape"; II. "Pain (Is Irrelevant)"	4:41: 3:00; 1:41
5.	"Kill You Tonight"	2:17
6.	"Hey Pete" (Billy Roberts, new lyrics by Peter Steele)	5:10
7.	"Kill You Tonight (Reprise)": I. "Kill You Tonight"; II. "Love You to Death"	7:08: 5:14; 1:54
Total length:		43:28

Bonus Track (1994 Remastered Edition)
No.	Title	Length
8.	"Paranoid" (Black Sabbath cover)	7:20
Total length:		50:48

== Personnel ==
- Peter Steele – lead vocals, bass guitar
- Kenny Hickey – guitar, backing vocals, co-lead vocals (on "Hey Pete")
- Josh Silver – keyboards, sound effects, backing vocals
- Sal Abruscato – drums
- Johnny Kelly – drums (on "Paranoid")

== Charts ==
2022 chart performance for The Origin of the Feces
Chart (2022)	Peak position
German Albums (Offizielle Top 100)	59
