= My Girlfriend's Girlfriend =

Single by Type O Negative

from the album October Rust
- Released: August 19, 1996
- Genre: Gothic metal, psychedelic rock
- Length: 3:46
- Label: Roadrunner Records
- Songwriter(s): Peter Steele
- Producer(s): Peter Steele; Josh Silver

Type O Negative singles chronology
"Summer Breeze" (1995)	"My Girlfriend's Girlfriend" (1996)	"Love You To Death" (1996)

"My Girlfriend's Girlfriend" is a song from American gothic metal band Type O Negative's 1996 album October Rust. The first single off of the aforementioned album, it describes a polyamorous relationship. According to an interview in Livewire, it was written at bandmate Josh Silver's house in a short amount of time. With its prominent organ and the almost lighthearted mood throughout, the song much more closely resembles 1960s psychedelic rock than the doom metal that prevails for most of the album.

== Tracklist ==
All songs written by Peter Steele except where noted.

No.	Title	Writer(s)	Length
1.	"My Girlfriend's Girlfriend"		3:50
2.	"Black Sabbath (From The Satanic Perspective)"	Osbourne, Iommi, Butler, Ward, Steele	7:48
3.	"Blood & Fire" (Out Of The Ashes Mix)		4:36

== Credits ==
- Peter Steele – lead vocals, bass guitar, additional guitar
- Kenny Hickey – guitars, backing vocals
- Josh Silver – keyboards, organ, backing vocals
- Johnny Kelly – drums
- Richard Kern – cover

== Charts and certifications ==
=== Weekly singles charts ===
Chart (1996)	Peak position
Germany (GfK)	96
Finland (Suomen virallinen lista)	15
Sweden (Sverigetopplistan)	42
UK (Official Charts Company)	156
