= Slow, Deep and Hard =

- Original Release (1991)

Studio album by Type O Negative
- Released: June 11, 1991
- Recorded: December 1989 – January 1990
- Studios: Systems Two (Brooklyn, New York City)
- Genres: Crossover thrash; doom metal; gothic metal
- Length: 58:31
- Label: Roadrunner
- Producer: Type O Negative

Type O Negative chronology
Slow, Deep and Hard (1991)	The Origin of the Feces (1992)

Alternative cover
- Remastered edition (2009)

Slow, Deep and Hard is the debut studio album by the American gothic metal band Type O Negative, released on June 11, 1991, through Roadrunner Records. The album was originally titled None More Negative, and released in 1990 as a demo under the group's former name Repulsion.

== Production ==
Keyboardist and producer Josh Silver convinced his parents to lend him $6,000 in late 1989 so the band could record the album.

== Composition ==
Revolver said that the album was "noisy and angry" and "a far cry from the hooky choruses and doom-out goth of their 1993 breakout, Bloody Kisses," having more in common with the New York hardcore sound of Peter Steele's previous band, Carnivore. The lyrics were intended to be sarcastic, though several songs, like "Unsuccessfully Coping With the Natural Beauty of Infidelity," "Prelude to Agony" and "Der Untermensch," led to accusations of misogyny, bigotry and Nazism in part due to Untermensch (German "sub-human") being a blanket term used by the Nazis to refer to non-Aryans (as Walter Kaufmann has noted, however, the term had been coined by 19th-century philosopher Friedrich Nietzsche, an adamant opponent of anti-Semitism, to refer to what Nietzsche considered the uniquely vulgar and mindless German everyman). Keyboardist Josh Silver, who is Jewish, recalled, "They just invented a bunch of shit and said we were Nazis. Meanwhile, there were bands playing right down the block that are sieg-heiling the audience, and nobody's bothering with them. But it was a good and bad thing. As a Jew, I obviously never wanna be labeled as a Nazi. But at the same time, go ahead and make us famous. That's fine." Silver said, regarding the album's lyrics, "I think Peter was at the height of his lyrical powers". However, they did not translate well to non-English speaking countries, where lyrics intended as being sarcastic were directly translated and taken literally. "Unsuccessfully Coping With the Natural Beauty of Infidelity" used the chord structure of Simple Minds' song "Don't You (Forget About Me)". "The Misinterpretation of Silence and Its Disastrous Consequences" consists of hiss from a blank audio cassette tape; Silver explained, "We actually just ran a blank tape. We were hoping people would think it was fucked up and turn their stereos up really loud. Then the next song would kick in." The main riff of "Gravitational Constant" was inspired by the theme song for the sitcom The Munsters.

== Release ==
The recordings on the album initially appeared on a demo called None More Negative, released under the band name Repulsion. After the band found out that there was another band using this name, they changed their name to Type O Negative. The cover image was taken from a pornographic magazine, a close-up of a penis entering a vagina during sexual intercourse.

On March 24, 2009, Type O Negative reissued the album with remastered audio and alternate artwork that featured a revised title/band name layout to more closely align with the rest of the band's catalog. The remastered edition included new photos, expanded liner notes, an exclusive, all-new interview with the band as well as the bonus track "Hey Pete (Pete's Ego Trip Version)" which originally appeared on the album The Least Worst Of. This is a studio version of the song which appears live on the album The Origin of the Feces.

== Reception ==
Professional ratings
Review scores
Source	Rating
AllMusic	3/5 stars
Christgau's Consumer Guide	(choice cut)
Collector's Guide to Heavy Metal	5/10
Kerrang!	5/5 stars
Metal.de	9/10
Raw	0.5/5 stars

== Track listing ==
All lyrics and music by Peter Steele, unless noted.

Slow, Deep and Hard (1991 original release)

No.	Title	Length
1.	"Unsuccessfully Coping With the Natural Beauty of Infidelity": I. "Anorganic Transmutogenesis (Synthetic Division)"; II. "Coitus Interruptus"; III. "I Know You're Fucking Someone Else"	12:39: 2:58; 2:25; 7:16
2.	"Der Untermensch": I. "Socioparasite"; II. "Waste of Life"	8:54: 2:47; 6:07
3.	"Xero Tolerance": I. "Type 'A' Personality Disorder"; II. "Kill You Tonight"; III. "Love You to Death" (includes samples from J. S. Bach)	7:45: 1:56; 4:59; 0:50
4.	"Prelude to Agony": I. "The Truth"; II. "God Love Fire Woman Death"; III. "Jackhammerape"; IV. "Pain (Is Irrelevant)"	12:14: 2:06; 4:10; 2:06; 3:52
5.	"Glass Walls of Limbo (Dance Mix)"	6:44
6.	"The Misinterpretation of Silence and Its Disastrous Consequences"	1:04
7.	"Gravitational Constant: G = 6.67 × 10^{−8} cm^{−3} gm^{−1} sec^{−2}": I. "Unjustifiable Existence"; II. "Acceleration (Due to Gravity) = 980cm⁻² sec"; III. "Antimatter: Electromechanical Psychedelicosis"; IV. "Requiem for a Soulless Man"	9:14: 2:18; 2:36; 1:06; 3:14
Total length:		58:34

Slow, Deep And Hard - Remaster (2009 remastered and expanded edition)

No.	Title	Writer(s)	{{{extra_column}}}	Length
1.	"Unsuccessfully Coping with the Natural Beauty of Infidelity": I. "Anorganic Transmutogenesis (Synthetic Division)"; II. "Coitus Interruptus"; III. "I Know You're Fucking Someone Else"			12:39: 2:58; 2:25; 7:16
2.	"Der Untermensch": I. "Socioparasite"; II. "Waste of Life"			8:54: 2:47; 6:07
3.	"Xero Tolerance": I. "Type 'A' Personality Disorder"; II. "Kill You Tonight"; III. "Love You to Death" (includes samples from J. S. Bach)			7:45: 1:56; 4:59; 0:50
4.	"Prelude to Agony": I. "The Truth"; II. "God Love Fire Woman Death"; III. "Jackhammerape"; IV. "Pain (Is Irrelevant)"			12:14: 2:06; 4:10; 2:06; 3:52
5.	"Glass Walls of Limbo (Dance Mix)"			6:44
6.	"The Misinterpretation of Silence and Its Disastrous Consequences"			1:04
7.	"Gravitational Constant: G = 6.67 × 10^{−8} cm^{−3} gm^{−1} sec^{−2}": I. "Unjustifiable Existence"; II. "Acceleration (Due to Gravity) = 980cm⁻² sec"; III. "Antimatter: Electromechanical Psychedelicosis"; IV. "Requiem for a Soulless Man"			9:14: 2:18; 2:36; 1:06; 3:14
8.	"Hey Pete (Pete's Ego Trip Version)" (Bonus Track)	Billy Roberts	Re-arranged by Peter Steele	5:19
Total length:				63:53

None More Negative (original 1990 cassette demo self-release)

No.	Title	Length
1.	"Unsuccessfully Coping with the Natural Beauty of Infidelity": I. "Anorganic Transmutogenesis (Synthetic Division)"; II. "Coitus Interruptus"; III. "I Know You're Fucking Someone Else"	12:39: 2:58; 2:25; 7:16
2.	"Gravitational Constant: G = 6.67 × 10^{−8} cm^{−3} gm^{−1} sec^{−2}": I. "Unjustifiable Existence"; II. "Acceleration (Due to Gravity) = 980cm⁻² sec"; III. "Antimatter: Electromechanical Psychedelicosis"; IV. "Requiem for a Soulless Man"	9:14: 2:18; 2:36; 1:06; 3:14
3.	"The Misinterpretation of Silence and Its Disastrous Consequences"	1:04
4.	"Prelude to Agony": I. "The Truth"; II. "God Love Fire Woman Death"; III. "Jackhammerape"; IV. "Pain (Is Irrelevant)"	12:14: 2:06; 4:10; 2:06; 3:52
5.	"Der Untermensch": I. "Socioparasite"; II. "Waste of Life"	8:54: 2:47; 6:07
6.	"Xero Tolerance": I. "Type 'A' Personality Disorder"; II. "Kill You Tonight"; III. "Love You to Death" (includes samples from J. S. Bach)	7:45: 1:56; 4:59; 0:50
Total length:		51:50

== Personnel ==
Personnel taken from Slow, Deep and Hard liner notes.

Type O Negative

- Peter Steele – lead vocals, bass
- Kenny Hickey – guitars, backing vocals
- Josh Silver – keyboards, backing vocals
- Sal Abruscato – drums, backing vocals

Production

- Type O Negative – production
- Michael Marciano – engineering
- Michael Sarsfield – mastering
- Peter Steele – art concept, design

== Charts ==
Chart performance for Slow, Deep and Hard
Chart (2021–2024)	Peak position
German Albums (Offizielle Top 100)	53
Hungarian Physical Albums (MAHASZ)	14
