= Christian Woman =

1993 single by Type O Negative

Single by Type O Negative

from the album Bloody Kisses
- Released: February 1994
- Recorded: 1993
- Studio: Systems Two, Brooklyn
- Genre: Gothic metal
- Length: 8:58 (album version); 4:24 (radio edit)
- Label: Roadrunner Records
- Songwriter: Peter Steele
- Producers: Peter Steele; Josh Silver

Type O Negative singles chronology
"Black No. 1 (Little Miss Scare-All)" (1993)	"Christian Woman" (1994)	"Summer Breeze" (1995)

Music video
- "Christian Woman" on YouTube

"Christian Woman" is a single by gothic metal band Type O Negative from their 1993 album Bloody Kisses. It is one of two songs (the other being "Black No. 1") that is credited with propelling the band into the mainstream. The song is inspired by a real woman with whom lead singer and songwriter Peter Steele was once romantically involved. Steele told Revolver, "She was a Roman Catholic, much as I am, but she would get off on breaking the rules a little bit. She would ask me to dress up as a priest and, well, I guess you can just imagine what would happen after that. So, I guess you could say I have a bit of a priest infection."

== Music videos ==
Two music videos exist for this song. The most well-known video, directed by Jon Reiss, uses the radio edit of the song, which is four minutes and twenty-four seconds long. The other video uses the longer album version of the song, which has a significantly longer runtime of eight minutes and fifty-eight seconds. Both videos are available on the 1998 video album After Dark.

== Track listing ==
All songs written by Peter Steele

No.	Title	Length
1.	"Christian Woman" (New & Unimproved Version)	4:24
2.	"Christian Woman" (Butt-Kissing, Sell-Out Version)	4:24
3.	"Suspended In Dusk" (Previously Too Embarrassed To Release)	8:37

== Personnel ==
- Peter Steele – lead vocals, bass guitar
- Kenny Hickey – guitar, backing vocals
- Josh Silver – keyboard, synthesizer, effects and programming, backing vocals
- Sal Abruscato – drums, percussion
