= Black No. 1 (Little Miss Scare-All) =

1993 single by Type O Negative

Promotional single by Type O Negative

from the album Bloody Kisses
- Released: 1993
- Recorded: 1993
- Studio: Systems Two, Brooklyn
- Genre: Gothic metal; alternative metal
- Length: 11:14
- Label: Roadrunner
- Songwriter: Peter Steele
- Producers: Peter Steele; Josh Silver

Type O Negative singles chronology
"Black No. 1 (Little Miss Scare-All)" (1993)	"Christian Woman" (1993)

Music video
- "Black No. 1 (Little Miss Scare-All)" on YouTube

"Black No. 1 (Little Miss Scare-All)" is a single by American gothic metal band Type O Negative from their 1993 album Bloody Kisses. The song was written by lead singer Peter Steele while driving a garbage truck; during an interview with Revolver, he stated: "I was waiting in line for three hours to dump 40 cubic yards of human waste at the Hamilton Avenue Marine Transfer Station, and I wrote the song in my head. I'm not kidding you."

The lyrics sarcastically detail a relationship with a woman involved with the Goth subculture, loosely based around a relationship Steele was once in, and throws many tongue-in-cheek references to Halloween, Nosferatu, and Lily Munster, as well as quick musical references to Vic Mizzy's The Addams Family Theme as well as Jack Marshall's The Munsters' Theme. It is arguably their signature song; although it never cracked the Billboard Hot 100, it was their best-selling single and was a mainstay on MTV's Headbangers Ball. In 2023, Rolling Stone ranked the song No. 64 on their list of the 100 greatest heavy metal songs of all time.

== Music video ==
A music video was made for the song, using a radio edit of about four and a half minutes in length as opposed to the eleven-minute recording on the album. Directed by Parris Mayhew, the video was recorded in black and white, with the exception during the breakdown where Peter Steele's eyes appear olive green during a close-up. Close-ups surrounded by shadows alternate with shots of the band performing in a decidedly traditional-looking concert hall, with gothic figures dancing in the background as the band plays classical or acoustic counterparts to their usual instruments; Steele takes advantage of his formidable height during this and plays a double bass as if it were a bass guitar.

== Track listing ==
All tracks are written by Peter Steele except where noted.

No.	Title	Length
1.	"Black No. 1 (Little Miss Scare-All)" (edit)	4:38
2.	"Christian Woman" (edit)	4:24
3.	"Summer Breeze" (edit) (Seals & Crofts cover)	4:29
4.	"We Hate Everyone" (edit)	6:52

== Personnel ==
- Peter Steele – bass, lead vocals
- Kenny Hickey – guitar, co-lead vocals
- Josh Silver – keyboards, backing vocals, effects
- Sal Abruscato – drums, percussion
