= Everything Dies =

Single by Type O Negative

from the album World Coming Down
- Released: November 1999
- Genre: Gothic metal; doom metal
- Length: 7:43
- Label: Roadrunner
- Songwriter(s): Peter Steele
- Producer(s): Peter Steele and Josh Silver

Type O Negative singles chronology
"Everyone I Love Is Dead" (1999)	"Everything Dies" (1999)	"I Don't Wanna Be Me" (2003)

Everything Dies is a song by American gothic metal band Type O Negative, released in 1999 on their fifth album World Coming Down. It was a successful single for the band making #37 on the Mainstream Rock Tracks.

== Music video ==
A music video was filmed for the song, featuring the band and singer Peter Steele in various settings, as well as footage of a family having dinner with the members of the family slowly fading away. In the end of the music video, Peter Steele goes underwater, possibly drowning himself. Part of the video was filmed in a shipyard where Steele's father - who died a few years before the album was recorded - used to work.

== Track listing ==
No.	Title	Length
1.	"Everything Dies" (Edit)	4:48
2.	"12 Black Rainbows"	5:13
3.	"Everything Dies" (Album Version)	7:43

== Charts ==
Chart (1999)	Peak position
UK Singles (OCC)	97
US Mainstream Rock (Billboard)	37
