= Type O Negative =

American gothic metal band (1989–2010)

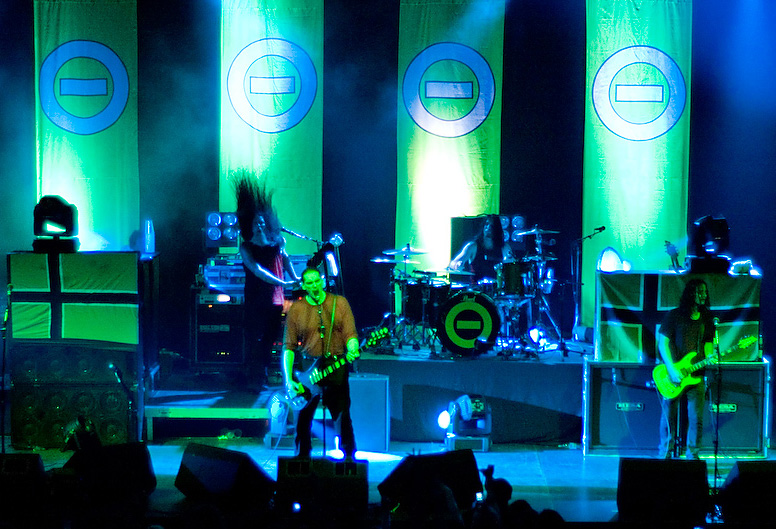
- Type O Negative performing at Columbiahalle in Berlin, June 2007

Background information
- Also known as: Repulsion (1989–1990); Sub-Zero (1990–1991)
- Origin: Brooklyn, New York City, U.S.
- Genres: Gothic metal; doom metal
- Works: Discography
- Years active: 1989–2010
- Labels: Roadrunner; Steamhammer
- Spinoffs: Seventh Void; A Pale Horse Named Death; Silvertomb
- Spinoff of: Fallout; Carnivore
- Past members: Peter Steele; Kenny Hickey; Josh Silver; Sal Abruscato; Johnny Kelly
- Website: typeonegative.net

Type O Negative was an American gothic/doom metal band from Brooklyn, New York, formed in 1989. The band was formed by vocalist and bassist Peter Steele, guitarist Kenny Hickey, keyboardist Josh Silver, and drummer Sal Abruscato, who was later replaced by Johnny Kelly. Their lyrical emphasis on themes of addiction, death, depression, religion, romance, and sex resulted in the nickname "the Drab Four", which is in homage to the Beatles' "Fab Four" moniker. The band went platinum with Bloody Kisses (1993) and gold with October Rust (1996), gaining a substantial cult following through seven studio albums, two best-of compilations, and concert DVDs.

Steele died on April 14, 2010, with some sources reporting the cause of death as heart failure brought on by an aortic aneurysm, while others list sepsis caused by diverticulitis. In November 2010, seven months after Steele's death, the surviving members of the band announced that they had split up.

In 2016, the staff of Loudwire ranked Type O Negative 32nd on their list of the Top 50 Best Metal Bands of All Time.

== History ==
=== Origins (1989–1991) ===
Type O Negative was formed after frontman Peter Steele's previous band, Carnivore, broke up. Steele formed a new band with childhood friends Sal Abruscato, Josh Silver, and Kenny Hickey, which they initially named Repulsion. The band later changed their name to Sub-Zero because another band with the name Repulsion already existed, then changed it again one final time, settling on the name Type O Negative. Steele was still tied to the multi-album contract he had made with Roadrunner Records during his time in Carnivore, despite the fact the band had broken up; after receiving a demo from Type O Negative, Roadrunner decided not to drop Steele, and the band signed to the record label in 1991. Shortly after signing, they released their debut, Slow, Deep and Hard.

=== Slow, Deep and Hard and The Origin of the Feces (1991–1992) ===
Type O Negative's first album, Slow, Deep and Hard, incorporated dragging Black Sabbath-esque dirge riffs, maniacal hardcore outbursts, and droning industrial and gothic atmospheres. The songs were long, multi-part theatrical epics, with lyrics loosely surrounding a story involving a man enacting revenge on a cheating girlfriend before ultimately contemplating his actions and committing suicide.

They began creating a new album, with the idea of presenting it as a live album. The subsequent 1992 album was entitled The Origin of the Feces and a warning label was put on the album cover: "Not Live at Brighton Beach". The album contains faux-live recordings of songs from Slow, Deep and Hard, as well as previously unreleased songs such as "Are You Afraid" and "Hey Pete" (a cover of Jimi Hendrix's "Hey Joe" with altered lyrics) and Black Sabbath's "Paranoid".

=== Bloody Kisses and October Rust (1993–1998) ===
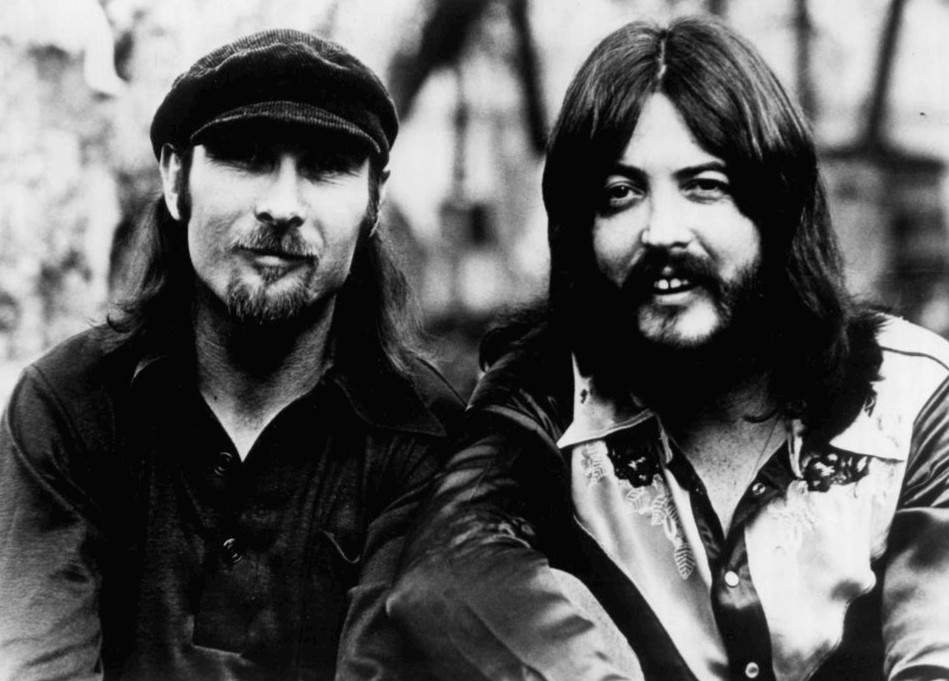
Type O Negative covered the Seals and Crofts song "Summer Breeze"

Bloody Kisses, Type O Negative's third album, was released in 1993 to critical and listener acclaim, and eventually became the first record on Roadrunner to reach certified gold status in the US. The newfound success reportedly put a lot of pressure on the band; initially, Peter Steele expressed disinterest in touring nationally. Monte Conner, Vice President of A&R at Roadrunner, said "there was a lot of pressure for him to take the band to the next level, but he didn't want to quit his job... There was a point where it looked like the band might break up."

Bloody Kisses mostly addressed loneliness and heartbreak, with songs like "Too Late: Frozen", "Blood & Fire" and "Can't Lose You". The organ-driven "Set Me on Fire" is vintage 1960s garage rock, while "Summer Breeze" covered the 1972 Seals and Crofts hit. "Christian Woman" and "Black No. 1 (Little Miss Scare-All)" became the most popular tracks, after having been edited down to radio-friendly lengths (the album versions were 9 and 11 minutes long respectively). In order to promote the album, Type O Negative embarked on a two-year world tour. During this time, the band was featured on MTV, VH1, and in Rolling Stone. In the midst of this media blitz, drummer Sal Abruscato quit the band to join another Brooklyn quartet, Life of Agony. Johnny Kelly, the band's drum technician, was therefore hired as a full-fledged member. Bloody Kisses was re-released a year after the original release in a limited-edition Digipak form, including eight of the musical tracks from the original (omitting the "filler" tracks) and the previously unreleased "Suspended in Dusk".

Type O Negative's October Rust picked up where Bloody Kisses left off, exploring themes of sex, nature and sensuality, first in a humorous sense on the single "My Girlfriend's Girlfriend" and then taken much darker with "Love You to Death". This record also saw a cover of Neil Young's "Cinnamon Girl" as well as the fan favorite, semi-serene "Green Man". While not quite as successful as Bloody Kisses, the album was certified gold in the US, and was the first Type O Negative album to enter the top half of the Billboard Top 200, debuting at No. 42.

=== World Coming Down and The Least Worst of Type O Negative (1999–2001) ===
With the completion of another successful world tour, writing for a fifth album began. In the period immediately following the release of October Rust, resulting in 1999's World Coming Down (working titles included Prophets of Doom and Aggroculture). World Coming Down debuted at No. 39 on the Billboard Top 200 charts. World Coming Down featured a much darker, bleak tone than its predecessors, having been written after a series of deaths in frontman Peter Steele's family.

A best of album followed in 2000, entitled The Least Worst of Type O Negative. Although most songs appear on previous albums, many are unreleased remixes or B-sides of previously released singles. Along with these songs are some unreleased numbers from the World Coming Down sessions, the band's cover of "Black Sabbath" by Black Sabbath (Peter Steele's version with different lyrics, written from the perspective of Satan), and a cleaner version of "Hey Pete" (originally released on the mock live album The Origin of the Feces).

=== Life Is Killing Me and Dead Again (2002–2009) ===
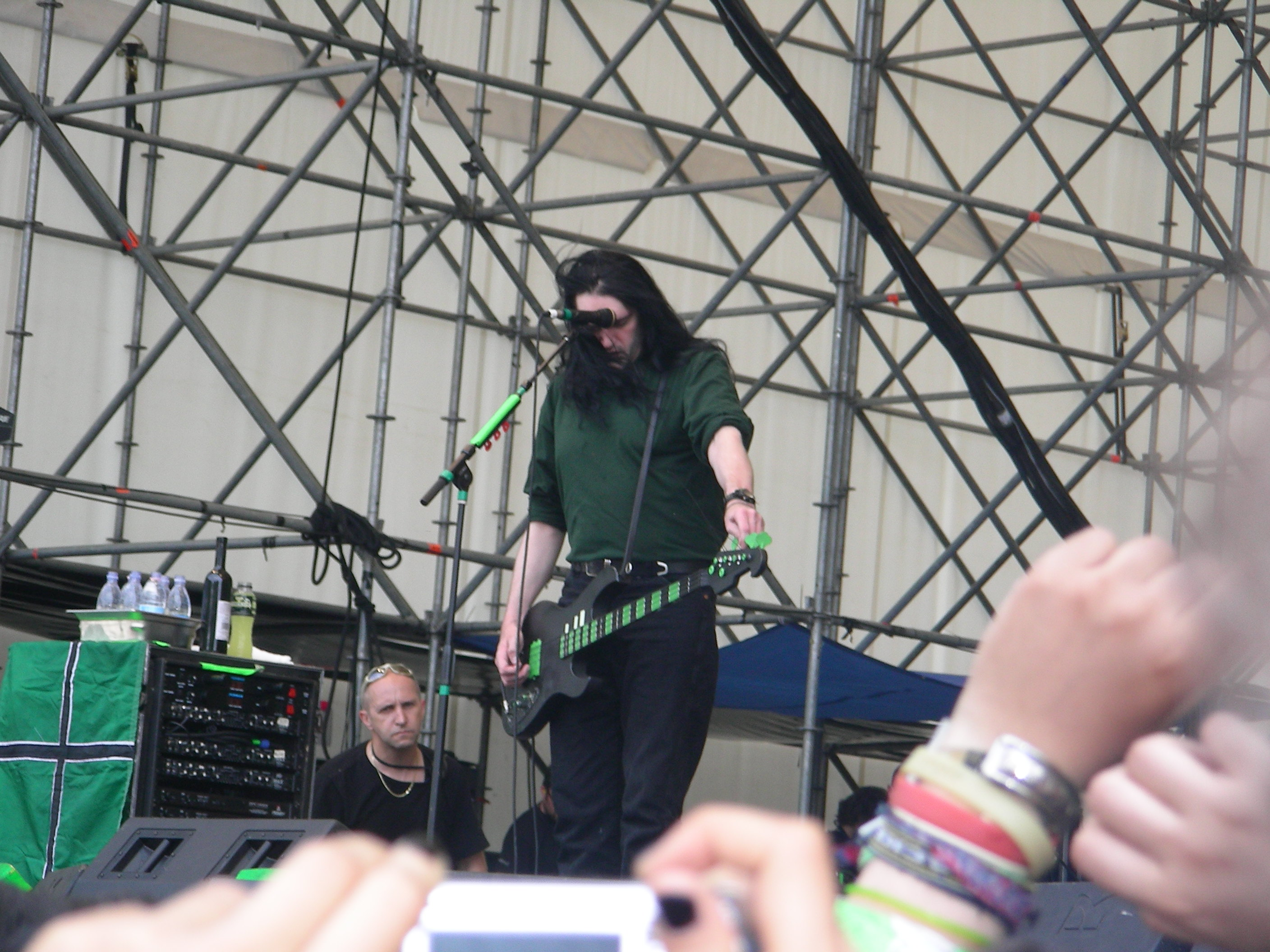
Type O Negative performed at Gods of Metal on June 30, 2007

Type O Negative's sixth studio album, Life Is Killing Me (originally called The Dream Is Dead after the closing song), was released in 2003. For this album, the band picked up the pace of their sound from the dirgeful slowness of World Coming Down. Songs such as "Todd's Ship Gods (Above All Things)", "(We Were) Electrocute", and "I Don't Wanna Be Me" convey the band's classic elements of melody, though the song lengths were much shorter on this outing, the longest being the 7 and a half-minute "How Could She?", a list of female character names from television shows. The album includes a humorous cover of the song "Angry Inch" from the musical Hedwig and the Angry Inch, detailing a sex change operation gone terribly wrong. Type O Negative left Roadrunner after the album's release, having fulfilled their contract for the label.

In June 2004, Type O Negative signed to the Steamhammer imprint of SPV Records. Their only album for the label, Dead Again, was released in 2007, and debuted at No. 27 in the United States, the band's highest chart debut to date. At the same time, Peter Steele's previous band, Carnivore, reunited with a new lineup that performed at the Wacken Open Air in 2006. Their influence is heard on Dead Again with the thrash and punk-influenced title track and "Tripping a Blind Man", while the slower "The Profit of Doom" and "September Sun" retain the gothic doom the band is known for. They continued to tour through October of that year, including a performance at the Rock am Ring festival in Germany.

=== Peter Steele's death, disbandment and aftermath (2010–present) ===
On April 14, 2010, frontman and bassist Peter Steele died, reportedly from heart failure. The cause of death was later reported to be sepsis, caused by diverticulitis. The following statement concerning Steele was released April 15 on the band's official website:

It is with great sadness that we inform you that Type O Negative front man, bassist, and our band mate, Peter Steele passed away last night of what appears to be heart failure. Ironically Peter had been enjoying a long period of sobriety and improved health and was imminently due to begin writing and recording new music for our follow up to Dead Again released in 2007.

The official cause of death has yet to be determined pending autopsy results. The funeral services will be private and memorial services will be announced at a future date. We'd like to share our thoughts and those of Peter's family below. We are truly saddened to lose our friend and appreciate the tremendous outpouring today from around the world.

Sincerely,

Josh, Kenny and Johnny

In a November 2010 interview with Rock Hard magazine, Johnny Kelly and Kenny Hickey confirmed that following Steele's death, Type O Negative had split up.

Roadrunner Records released a box set of all the band's albums (with the exception of Dead Again) for Back to Black Friday 2011, a spinoff of Record Store Day, on November 25, 2011. Each vinyl cover has no text and The Origin of the Feces uses its original cover art. The box set also contains various bumper stickers related to the band. It was re-released in 2019, with new outer box art, remastered sound and a new, vinyl-specific version of the intro track "Skip It!" from World Coming Down (the original box set used the original CD version of the track).

The surviving members of Type O Negative have rejected numerous offers to reform the band with a new vocalist. In a June 2023 interview with Loaded Radio, Hickey said that he was against this idea, explaining: "People have approached us to try and reform the band with a singer and go on the road...We personally don't think Peter is replaceable by anyone and it just wouldn't work." He did, however, mention that he would not be against the idea of some kind of tribute show with guest musicians, saying: "If somebody had the idea and got it together and got the logistics together, sure – I would be into that." He also mentioned that Johnny Kelly would love to perform a tribute show for Steele, but Josh Silver would more than likely not participate due to his current job as a paramedic. Kelly has also stated that a Type O Negative reunion without Steele would never happen, but believes the latter "deserves some kind of celebration" and did not rule out a tribute show.

In 2023, Hickey and Kelly reunited to form Eye Am with Kirk Windstein and Todd Strange (currently and formerly of Crowbar respectively); and in the following year, the band changed their name to Sun Don't Shine. Their debut studio album, From Birth to Death, was released on April 1, 2026.

== Artistry ==
=== Musical style ===
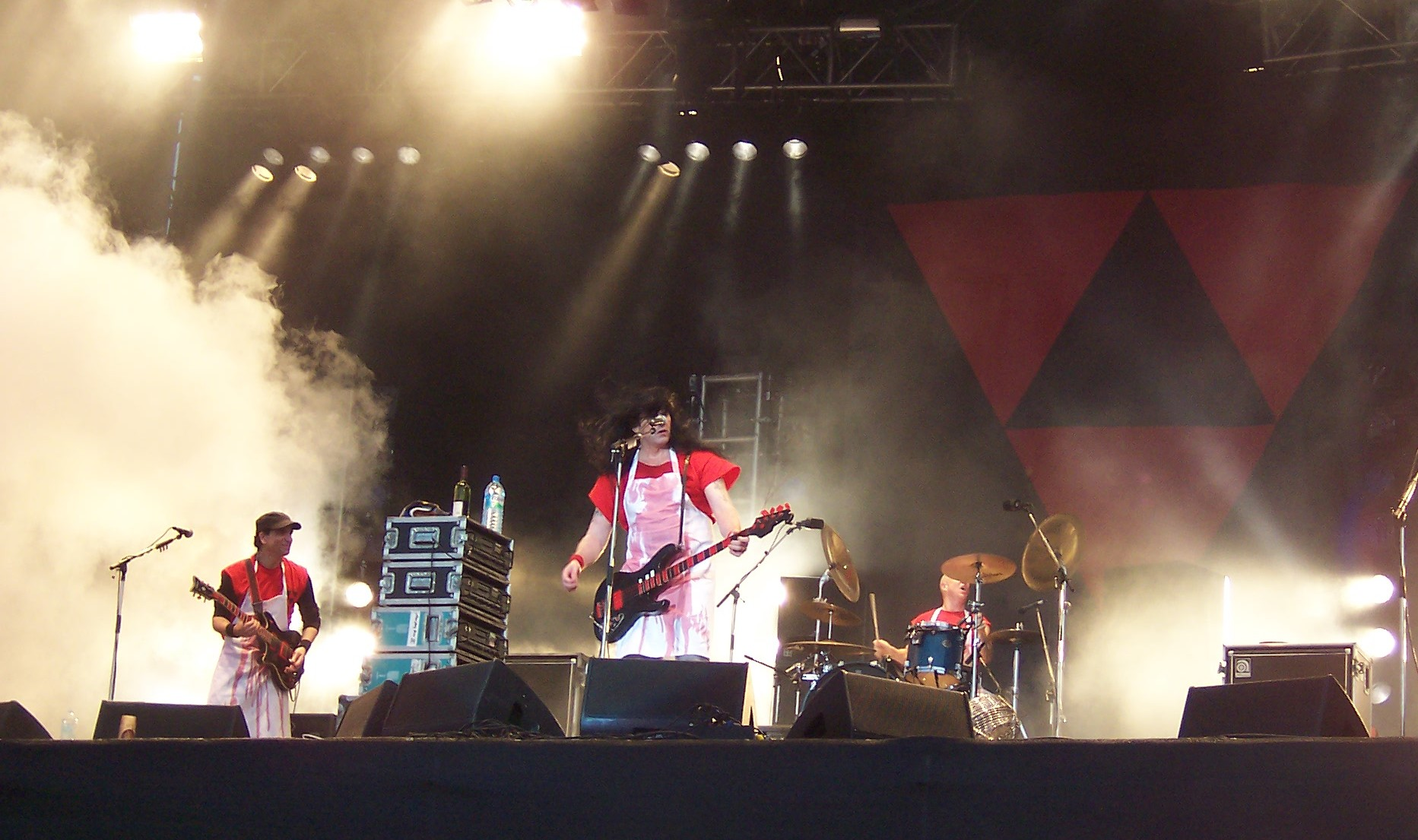
Peter Steele's previous band, Carnivore

Type O Negative is primarily a gothic metal and doom metal band. However, their musical style is equally genre-blending with elements of alternative metal, progressive metal, gothic rock, industrial metal, punk rock and thrash metal. The band's first two albums, Slow, Deep and Hard and Origin of the Feces, are rooted in crossover thrash. They consist of leftover songs from Peter Steele's previous band, Carnivore, and only elements of gothic doom. This is reversed on Bloody Kisses, where the punk- and thrash-influenced "Kill All the White People" and "We Hate Everyone" are outliers. The rest of the album established them as pioneers of gothic metal by combining Black Sabbath-esque doom metal, the Sisters of Mercy-esque gothic rock, The Beatles-esque pop and experimental psychedelic rock.

Type O Negative doubled down on gothic metal with October Rust. Seen as their most accessible album, it combines lush guitars, heavy ballads and Pink Floyd-esque atmosphere. Johnny Kelly is credited as the band's drummer for the first time, but programmed drums are actually used. World Coming Down is considered their darkest and most doom metal-influenced album, being written after a series of deaths in Steele's family. The following Life is Killing Me and Dead Again are similarly dark, but more punk-influenced. The former has been described as "arena goth rock", bringing back Steele's sense of irony but paired with a more mainstream sound. The latter reintroduces thrash metal into the band's formula (influenced by Carnivore reuniting the same year as its release) and is the only album that Kelly recorded with a physical drum kit.

=== Influences ===
Regarding the band's influences, Johnny Kelly has stated, "The common denominators, for certain, were The Beatles and Black Sabbath. Those are the two bands that everybody agreed on. They were favorites. Everybody was into different, various things. Those were the two that there was never an argument when one of their songs was being played."

Additionally, Steele cited Deep Purple, Led Zeppelin, Judas Priest, AC/DC, Cocteau Twins, Dead Can Dance, Einstürzende Neubauten, Curve, Duran Duran, the Cure, Depeche Mode, Devo, Laibach, Lycia, the Sisters of Mercy, Slowdive, Gary Numan, and OMD, as personal influences. In the past, Steele and his bandmates expressed the frontman's appreciation for shoegaze acts Lush and My Bloody Valentine and for synth-pop bands A Flock of Seagulls and Simple Minds. According to Kelly, he and Josh Silver were influenced by grunge bands Alice In Chains and Soundgarden.

== Soundtracks and covers ==
Type O Negative's songs have appeared in many motion pictures, including "Blood and Fire (Out of the Ashes Remix)" on the 1995 Mortal Kombat movie soundtrack (also on the bonus CD of Life Is Killing Me), "Love You to Death" in Bride of Chucky, "Everyone I Love Is Dead" in Faust: Love of the Damned, "(We Were) Electrocute" in Freddy vs. Jason, and "Summer Breeze" in I Know What You Did Last Summer. As a result of Howard Stern being a self-professed fan, Private Parts: The Album contains "Pictures of Matchstick Men" with the band playing music and Ozzy Osbourne on vocals. "Haunted" also appears on The Blair Witch Project "soundtrack CD" (the album's concept was to contain songs from "a tape that was found in the woods with the students' gear"). In 1998, Arrow Videos made their own version of the 1922 classic horror film Nosferatu by simply overdubbing the silent film with a soundtrack consisting entirely of Type O Negative tracks, taken from the first four albums. This version is now on DVD from DigiView Entertainment, a company that makes budget-priced DVDs. It also has an introduction by actor David Carradine.

In other media, the computer game Descent 2 features a shortened, instrumental version of the track "Haunted". Additionally, Descent 2: The Vertigo Series contains a full-length version of the instrumental; the compilation Duke Nukem: Music to Score By features "Cinnamon Girl (Extended Depression Mix)"; "Love You to Death" in the computer game Blood; "Out of the Fire" from the Life Is Killing Me bonus CD was a theme created for wrestler Kane, but was never used. The opening two seconds of "I Don't Wanna Be Me" were used as a frequent sample in Grand Theft Auto IV, on the Liberty Rock Radio Station, and 2012 video game The Darkness II features Type O Negative's "Black No. 1" in its multiplayer lobby, played at random amongst other songs.

Type O Negative performed and recorded numerous covers. The Doors' "Light My Fire" has been covered live numerous times, mostly during the 1990s. Steele has described the song as "probably the greatest song ever written" before apologizing for having "destroyed it". Seals and Crofts' "Summer Breeze" appears on Bloody Kisses, and Neil Young's "Cinnamon Girl" appears on October Rust. The tongue-in-cheek "Angry Inch" (from Hedwig and the Angry Inch) appears on Life is Killing Me. World Coming Down includes a Beatles medley consisting of "Day Tripper", "If I Needed Someone", and "I Want You (She's So Heavy)". Other covers include a rendition of Black Sabbath's "Paranoid" and "N.I.B."; Status Quo's "Pictures of Matchstick Men" with Ozzy Osbourne, two versions of "Black Sabbath" (one with the original lyrics and one rewritten by Peter Steele to be from Satan's perspective), Jimi Hendrix's "Hey Joe" (rewritten as "Hey Pete"); the Beatles' "Back in the U.S.S.R.", Deep Purple's "Highway Star", and Creedence Clearwater Revival's "Bad Moon Rising". A medley of Santana's "Evil Ways", "Oye Como Va", and "Black Magic Woman" are also available on the CD accompanying the DVD Symphony for the Devil. The 2007 tour song set started with a cover of "Magical Mystery Tour" from the Beatles.

"In the Flesh", originally written by Pink Floyd from their album The Wall, is another song that Type O Negative covered, used to open their 1999 World Tour. This version can be seen on the live DVD Symphony for the Devil. Also on the same DVD, in "Too Late: Frozen", the intro began with Jethro Tull's "Aqualung".

== Band members ==
Final lineup

- Peter Steele – bass, lead vocals, keyboards, guitars (1989–2010; his death)
- Kenny Hickey – guitars, vocals (1989–2010)
- Josh Silver – keyboards, synthesizers, sampler, backing vocals (1989–2010)
- Johnny Kelly – drums, backing vocals (1993–2010)

Previous members

- Sal Abruscato – drums (1989–1993)

Touring

- Scott Warren – keyboards (2009)

Timeline

== Discography ==
Studio albums

- Slow, Deep and Hard (1991)
- The Origin of the Feces (1992)
- Bloody Kisses (1993)
- October Rust (1996)
- World Coming Down (1999)
- Life Is Killing Me (2003)
- Dead Again (2007)

== Awards and nominations ==
Award	Year	Nominee(s)	Category	Result	Ref.
Žebřík Music Awards	1996	Themselves	Best International Group	Nominated	
Žebřík Music Awards	1996	Peter Steele	Best International Male	Nominated	
Žebřík Music Awards	1996	October Rust	Best International Album	Nominated	
Žebřík Music Awards	1996	"My Girlfriend's Girlfriend"	Best International Video	Nominated	
