= Black Sabbath (song) =

1970 song by Black Sabbath

Song by Black Sabbath

from the album Black Sabbath
- Released: 13 February 1970
- Recorded: 17 November 1969
- Studio: Regent Sounds (London)
- Genre: Heavy metal; doom metal
- Length: 6:16
- Label: Vertigo
- Songwriters: Ozzy Osbourne; Tony Iommi; Geezer Butler; Bill Ward
- Producer: Rodger Bain

Audio sample
- file; help

"Black Sabbath" is a song by the English heavy metal band of the same name, written in 1969 and released on their eponymous debut album in 1970. In the same year, the song appeared as an A-side on a four-track 12-inch single, with "The Wizard" also on the A-side and "Evil Woman" and "Sleeping Village" on the B-side, on the Philips Records label Vertigo. In Japan and the Philippines, a 7-inch single on the Philips label was released with "Evil Woman" on the A-side and "Black Sabbath" on the B-side.

In 2021, Eli Enis of Revolver included the song in his list of the "15 Greatest Album-Opening Songs in Metal".

== History ==
According to the band, the song was inspired by an experience that Geezer Butler had in the days of Earth. Butler, obsessed with the occult at the time, painted his apartment matte black and placed several inverted crucifixes and pictures of Satan on the walls. Ozzy Osbourne gave Butler a black occult book, written in Latin and decorated with numerous pictures of Satan. Butler read the book and then placed it on a shelf beside his bed before going to sleep. When he woke up, he claims he saw a large black figure standing at the end of his bed, staring at him. The figure vanished and Butler ran to the shelf where he had placed the book earlier, but the book was gone. Butler related this story to Osbourne, who then wrote the lyrics to the song based on Butler's experience. The song starts with the lyrics:

What is this that stands before me?
Figure in black which points at me.

A version of this song from Black Sabbath's first demo exists on the Ozzy Osbourne compilation album The Ozzman Cometh. The song has an extra verse with additional vocals before the bridge. It was one of the band's most frequently performed tracks, being featured on every single tour of their career; with the exception of Back To The Beginning

== Composition ==
Classic Rock Magazine characterized the track as "ominous, claustrophobic, overwhelming, mournful [and] pacey".

The main riff is a G5 power chord followed by an octave into a tritone away from the chord's root. The riff is fairly simple, highlighting the dissonant and dark sound of the tritone against a stagnant harmonic rhythm. This particular interval, the tritone, is often known as the diabolus in musica, for it has musical qualities which are often used to suggest Satanic connotations in Western music. The song "Black Sabbath" was one of the earliest examples in heavy metal to make use of this interval, and since then, the genre has made extensive use of diabolus in musica.

The riff was created when bassist Geezer Butler began playing a fragment of "Mars" from Gustav Holst's The Planets suite. Inspired, guitarist Tony Iommi returned the next day with the famously dark tritone.

The main riff of "Black Sabbath" is one of the most famous examples of harmonic progressions with the tritone G-C♯:

== Reception ==
"Black Sabbath" was ranked the second-best Black Sabbath song by Rock - Das Gesamtwerk der größten Rock-Acts im Check. It was ranked the best song in Black Sabbath's Ozzy Osbourne-era discography by Loudwire. In 2020, Kerrang! ranked the song number one on their list of the 20 greatest Black Sabbath songs, and in 2021, Louder Sound ranked the song number three on their list of the 40 greatest Black Sabbath songs. In March 2023, "Black Sabbath" placed first on Rolling Stone's "100 Greatest Heavy Metal Songs of All Time" list.

"Black Sabbath" was the final song played by Boston rock radio station WAAF on 22 February 2020, its final day of broadcasting. According to longtime WAAF host Mistress Carrie, the song was chosen because "the album came out weeks before we signed on the air, and Ozzy released a new album the day we signed off, and is the only artist to stay current for all 50 years of our history, and well... SATAN. If EMF was going to take our beloved signal, they were going to have to endure Satan first."

== Legacy and influence ==
The song is considered to have been influential on the development of the doom metal subgenre. In his 2020 book Doomed to Fail, author JJ Anselmi said "Doom metal has been delivering that sweet, sloth-paced sense of impending death and destruction since the very first, terrifying tri-tone at the beginning of 'Black Sabbath,' the track that kicked off the eponymous Black Sabbath record in 1970."

Nick Ruskell of Kerrang! said "with this opening throw from their self-titled debut, Sabbath can be credited with not only drawing the line in the sand between heavy rock and the newer, more sinister sound of metal, but also defined a shadowy corner of it that would slowly bloom over the next half a century. The bell, the tritone, the trill, the tempo, Satan coming round the bend – it would inspire a thousand doom bands, but none would ever manage to be quite so doom as this."

According to Classic Rock Magazine in 2021: "If you ever come across anyone who’s never heard a note of metal music, and they ask you explain it to them, just sit them down, turn up the volume and play the song 'Black Sabbath,' because this is the definition of the genre. Nothing else need be said or added. The whole of metal is contained in this one remarkable track. Everything since has been based on what Black Sabbath did here. [...] t’s the opening track on the first album by the forefathers of metal." In 2021, Eli Enis of Revolver included the song in his list of the "15 Greatest Album-Opening Songs in Metal".

== Music video ==
A music video was made for the song, as part of the band's 1970 performance on the German show Beat-Club. The video was filmed in a studio with a village on the foreground.
