= Peter Steele =

American musician (1962–2010)

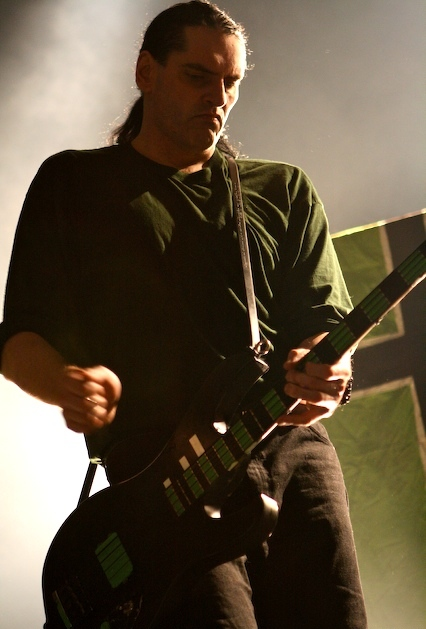
- Steele in 2007

Background information
- Born: Peter Thomas Ratajczyk; January 4, 1962; New York City, U.S.
- Died: April 14, 2010 (aged 48) Scranton, Pennsylvania, U.S.
- Genres: Gothic metal; doom metal; heavy metal; thrash metal (early)
- Occupations: Musician; singer; songwriter
- Instruments: Vocals; bass guitar
- Years active: 1983–2010
- Formerly of: Type O Negative; Carnivore; Fallout

Peter Thomas Ratajczyk (January 4, 1962 – April 14, 2010), known professionally as Peter Steele, was an American musician who was the lead vocalist, bassist, and composer of the gothic metal band Type O Negative. Before forming Type O Negative, Steele had formed the heavy metal band Fallout and the thrash metal band Carnivore.

As the frontman for Type O Negative, Steele was known for his vampiric appearance, 6 ft 8 in (2.03 m) stature, rich bass vocals, and a dark, often self-deprecating sense of humor. His lyrics have been described as "often intensely personal, dealing with subjects including love, loss and addiction." Steele credited Black Sabbath and the Beatles as his key musical influences. He has been listed among the "66 Best Hard Rock and Metal Frontmen of All Time" by Loudwire.

== Early life ==
Steele was born Peter Thomas Ratajczyk on January 4, 1962, in Red Hook, Brooklyn, New York City, to a Catholic family. His father was of Polish descent and his mother of Scottish-Irish ancestry. He was raised in the Bensonhurst and Brighton Beach neighborhoods of Brooklyn. Steele was the youngest of six children, with five older sisters. His father fought in World War II and later worked at a shipyard. Steele started taking guitar lessons at age 12, before moving on to bass six months later.

Though Steele was naturally left-handed, he played right-handed bass guitars throughout his career. This came about when one of his earliest bands, Aggression (also featuring Josh Silver), for which Steele played left-handed rhythm guitar, threatened to kick him out unless he switched to bass guitar. As a left-handed bass guitar proved to be too expensive at the time, Steele purchased a right-handed bass and taught himself how to play it.

Steele attended Edward R. Murrow High School in the Midwood neighborhood of Brooklyn. Steele worked for the New York City Department of Parks and Recreation until he began touring with Type O Negative in the summer of 1994. He was based at Brooklyn Heights Promenade, where his job involved park maintenance, driving vehicles including garbage trucks and steamrollers, and eventual promotion to the role of park supervisor. Steele considered his days working for the parks department to be among his happiest.

== Musical career ==
=== Fallout and Carnivore (1979–1987) ===
In 1979, Steele formed the heavy metal band Fallout. In 1982, after the split of Fallout, Steele formed the thrash metal band Carnivore. With Carnivore, Steele's lyrics were often harsh, dealing with religion, war, race and misogyny. Carnivore released their debut self-titled album in 1985. In 1986, Steele wrote lyrics for several songs on hardcore punk band Agnostic Front's second album Cause for Alarm. In 1987, Carnivore released Retaliation, before splitting up later that year.

=== Type O Negative ===
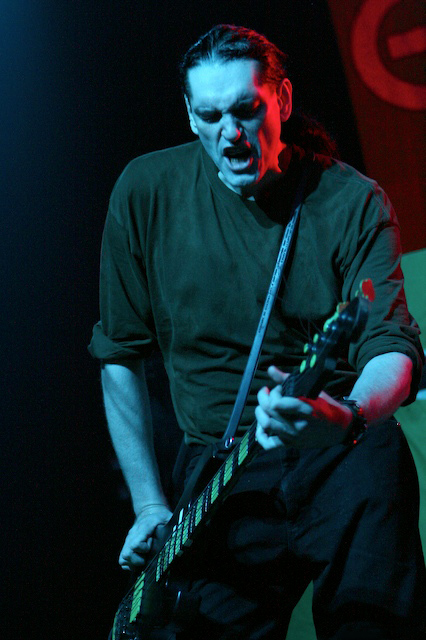
Steele with Type O Negative in 2007

==== Formation ====
Steele formed the band in 1989 along with his childhood friends Josh Silver, Kenny Hickey and Sal Abruscato (later replaced by Johnny Kelly). The band originally used the name "Repulsion", but had to change it in 1990 due to legal issues with the American grindcore band of the same name. The band then used the name "Subzero". Steele had a tattoo in mind of a minus sign contained within the number 0 that he originally intended to represent the Subzero band logo. After discovering that another band was already using the Subzero name, and with his tattoo in mind, Steele came up with the name "Type O Negative" after hearing a radio advertisement requesting donations of type O negative blood. When Type O Negative signed with Roadrunner Records, Steele signed his recording contract with a mixture of Suave hair conditioner and chocolate syrup mixed with food dye, contrary to popular belief that it was his own blood and semen.

==== Slow, Deep and Hard and The Origin of the Feces (1991–1992) ====
Type O Negative's debut album, Slow, Deep and Hard, was released in 1991. The album incorporated the thrash elements of Carnivore merged with doom metal. Steele had written the music in the space of one night in the aftermath of a relationship break-up, and this was reflected in the lyrical topics of heartbreak, fantasies of revenge, and the contemplation of suicide; something Steele had himself attempted: "On October 15th, 1989, I slashed my wrists. All I can say is that I fell in love with the wrong person."

Steele caused some controversy when touring in Europe to support Slow, Deep and Hard, thanks to rumors about his social and political views, with some critics going so far as to brand him a Nazi sympathizer, even though his bandmate, Josh Silver, is Jewish. Steele suggested that the European press had misunderstood his humor, and that his sarcasm was sometimes lost in translation to print.

In 1992, Type O Negative released the "live" album The Origin of the Feces. The album included a fictitious hostile audience and an evacuation of the venue after a bomb threat had supposedly been called in. This simulated some of the real-life responses Steele and Type O Negative had recently received while on tour in Europe. The original album cover featured a close-up shot of Steele's anus.

==== Bloody Kisses, October Rust and World Coming Down (1993–2002) ====
In 1993, Type O Negative released its breakthrough album Bloody Kisses. The album focused primarily on romance, love, sex, and death. The song "Black No.1 (Little Miss Scare-All)" pays tribute to gothic subculture and is a satirical ode to a goth girl Steele had once dated. Steele attacked his detractors with the songs "We Hate Everyone" and "Kill All the White People", which dealt directly with the band's rumored racist ideology and served to erode any such accusations. Bloody Kisses eventually achieved Platinum status and established Type O Negative as one of gothic metal's most influential bands.

Type O Negative released the album October Rust in 1996. It featured a more multi-layered and melodic sound than its predecessor, though it retained similar lyrical themes. Steele penned the majority of the material on October Rust while on the road touring, though he had conceived some of the basic musical ideas during his early teens. Steele designed the Vinland flag that first appeared on the October Rust artwork. It has since appeared on every subsequent release by the band. The flag encompassed a variety of Steele's interests, political beliefs and his heritage. Steele based the design on a Nordic cross flag that incorporates his favorite colors. The concept of Vinland is also referred to in the title of the track "The Glorious Liberation of the People's Technocratic Republic of Vinland by the Combined Forces of the United Territories of Europa". "My Girlfriend's Girlfriend" is a tale about a ménage à trois that Steele based on a few true-life experiences. The song "Green Man" had two meanings for Steele; it is written about the Celtic embodiment of nature, and Steele's time with the parks department, when young children called him the "Green Man" due to the green uniform he wore on the job. The song introduction includes a sample of the garbage truck once driven by Steele. The song "Red Water (Christmas Mourning)" is about his father's death. October Rust eventually achieved Gold status.

Steele had been dealing with personal problems during the recording and mixing of 1999's stripped-down and heavier sounding World Coming Down. Themes of drug abuse and addiction appeared on the album, particularly on the song "White Slavery". Death also featured heavily on the album, with Steele mourning the loss of loved ones on the tracks "Everyone I Love is Dead" and "Everything Dies". Steele recounted his experience with psychiatric treatment on the song "Who Will Save the Sane?". On "Pyretta Blaze" Steele tells of his sexual fantasy involving fire. Steele noted the emotional strain caused by executing songs from World Coming Down in a live setting. The setlists for live shows performed since the initial tour to support World Coming Down usually featured very few selections from the album.

In 2000, Steele made a guest appearance on the song "Just Say No To Love" from Iommi, the first solo album by Black Sabbath guitarist Tony Iommi. In 2001, Steele made a guest appearance on the song "Cross the Line" from the Biohazard album Uncivilization. In 2002, he guest appeared on the track "Descent" from the Doro album Fight.

==== Life Is Killing Me and Dead Again (2003–2010) ====
Type O Negative released the album Life Is Killing Me in 2003. Lyrically the album deals with topics including self-pity, hatred, drugs, death and religion. On the title track Steele offers his criticism of the medical profession. The song "Nettie" centers around Steele's mother, while "Todd's Ship Gods (Above All Things)" is about his father. "The Dream is Dead" refers to Steele finding it difficult to celebrate Valentine's Day as the date coincides with the anniversary of his father's death. Steele wrote the song "(We Were) Electrocute" about a "stunning" ex-girlfriend, and how they would attract the interest of passers-by when out together as a couple. Steele's favorite female television characters are the inspiration for the track "How Could She?". "I Like Goils" makes light of the attention Steele received from gay men, specifically after his photo shoot for Playgirl magazine.

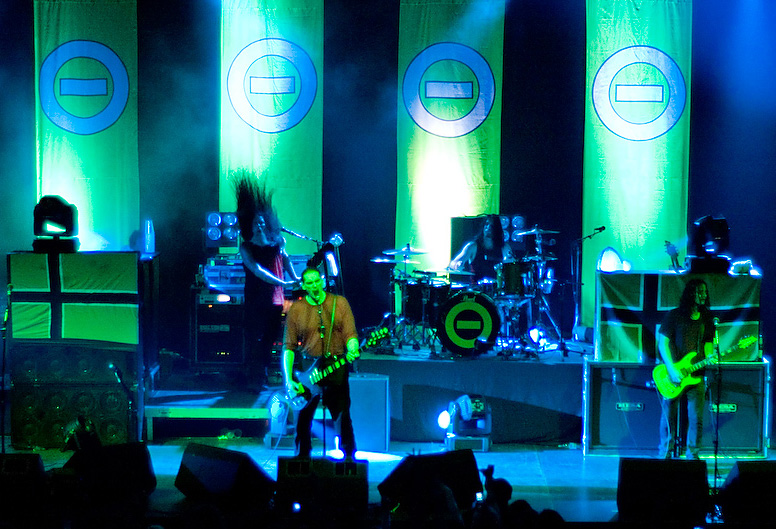
Steele performing in Berlin, Germany with Type O Negative, 2007

In 2005, Type O Negative left Roadrunner Records. Steele had never been happy with the conditions of the recording contract and had described it as "a millstone around my neck". Steele alleged that Type O Negative's split from Roadrunner Records, aside from a poor offer, had to do with an unauthorized release of a best-of compilation. Steele remained on friendly terms with the staff at Roadrunner Records and in October 2005 he appeared on the Roadrunner United album to help celebrate the label's 25th anniversary.

There were unconfirmed rumors at one point of Steele's death after the band website posted an image of a tombstone bearing his name and the dates 1962–2005. According to an article dated May 14, 2005, Steele was not dead; the gag was related to their fresh signing with SPV Records. The website discontinued the tombstone picture in October 2005.

In 2006, Steele reactivated Carnivore with a new lineup that included longtime Type O Negative collaborator Paul Bento. The band played at the Wacken Open Air festival in 2006.

Steele made his final recording on the 2007 Type O Negative album Dead Again. He revealed on MTV's Headbangers Ball that the new alliance with SPV Records was probably his favorite thing about Dead Again from a production standpoint. Steele considered Dead Again to be less melancholic and more positive compared to the band's previous albums. The album cover depicts the Russian mystic Rasputin, a historical figure that Steele admired. The title track touches on drug abuse and Steele's sense of having killed part of himself after suffering a relapse. "Tripping a Blind Man" is a diatribe on how Steele felt after his involuntary commitment was brought about by his family. "Halloween in Heaven" is a song about dead rockstars that Steele was inspired to write by the death of his close friend Dimebag Darrell. Steele's final live performance was on Halloween night at Harpos Concert Theatre in Detroit, Michigan, the last show of Type O Negative's 2009 tour.

== Further appearances ==
=== Playgirl ===
Following the success of Bloody Kisses, Steele began to receive attention outside of music. He appeared as a nude centerfold of Playgirl in 1995. Steele later found out via bandmate Kenny Hickey's contacts that only 23% of the magazine subscribers were female, and after being asked by men to sign copies of the magazine, Steele somewhat regretted the decision: "After I did it, I thought, 'Oh my God, what did I do?' It was more than upsetting that so many guys had it. Girls, OK, but there just seemed to be at least as many guys. Not that I'm homophobic, but it was certainly irritating." In a 2007 interview, Steele reflected on the posing as merely a naive publicity stunt.

=== Television and film ===
Steele went on to appear as a guest on the talk shows Ricki Lake, The Jerry Springer Show, and The Howard Stern Show. In 2003, Steele had an acting role in the episode "Exeunt Omnes" of the series Oz. In 2003, he appeared in the film Dirtbags (Armpit of Metal). He followed this with a role in the 2005 film Bad Acid. Steele is among the musicians featured in the 2011 documentary Living the American Nightmare.

== Personal life ==
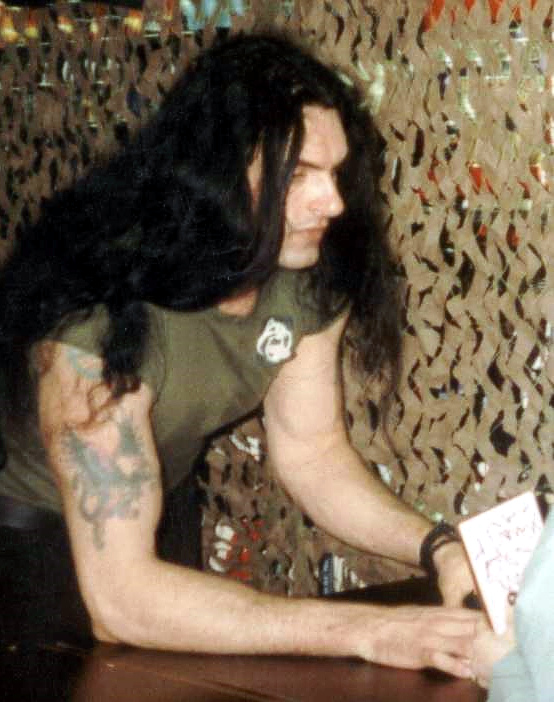
Steele at an in-store signing in London, circa 1997

Steele stood 6 ft 8 in (203 cm) tall, giving him a menacing stage appearance. Despite that perception, Steele admitted to suffering from stage fright, which he overcame by drinking alcohol before shows, and by drinking red wine when on stage. He was also described as a person who was "friendly, funny and had a reputation for being generous to his longtime bandmates ... and kind to the bands he toured with." In his autobiography Iron Man, Black Sabbath's Tony Iommi described his shock at Steele's death, adding, "Peter was a big, tall, and very, very nice guy."

Outside of music, Steele spent time lifting weights both at home and on his tour bus. Steele also enjoyed reading books on the subject of science and he had an interest in European culture. Steele liked working on his house and was interested in architecture and civil engineering. Steele also worked on his cars, including a heavily modified 1985 Pontiac Grand Prix he customized himself.

Steele had a love for cats and kept several as pets. In the booklet for the 2009 "Top Shelf" edition re-release of Bloody Kisses, Steele confirmed that the album's dirge-like 11-minute title track had in fact been written about the death of a family cat called Venus he had owned for 17 years. Steele expressed interest in having a wife and children, but did not wish to start a family while active in music and touring, stating "I don’t want to be away from my wife and kid for 'X Amount' of time and I don’t think they should come on tour either. It is certainly not a place to raise a family. If other people in bands want to do it, well, that’s up to them."

During 2005, Steele disappeared for an extended period with no explanation. Rumors of his death, terminal illness, and other speculations increased until the mystery was dispelled in an interview on the 2006 DVD Symphony for the Devil. In the interview Steele briefly mentions his incarceration in Rikers Island and "the psych ward at Kings County Hospital". Steele's family members had staged an intervention and insisted he check into a mental institution. Steele later confirmed he had been suffering from paranoia caused by his heavy substance abuse. Steele had been using cocaine since the age of 35, a decision for which he expressed great regret. Steele then attended rehab for cocaine dependence and alcoholism, and later served a 30-day prison term for assaulting a "love rival." Steele made light of his incarceration by wearing a prison uniform on stage during live performances.

Steele stated in a 2003 interview that he had bipolar disorder, and linked his mood swings to the types of songs he wrote. He also received occasional psychiatric treatment for depressive episodes. During a 2007 interview Steele explained:

"I've always been a very depressed person, but that's only one side of me, you know. It makes me feel better when I can express my depression, my anger, my frustration through music ... sonic therapy."

In April 2007, Steele revealed that he began identifying again as Catholic in recent years, after decades of self-professed atheism. In an interview with Decibel magazine, Steele explained:

"There are no atheists in foxholes, they say, and I was a foxhole atheist for a long time. But after going through a midlife crisis and having many things change very quickly, it made me realize my mortality. And when you start to think about death, you start to think about what's after it. And then you start hoping there is a God. For me, it's a frightening thought to go nowhere. I also can't believe that people like Hitler are gonna go to the same place as Mother Teresa."

Steele's biography Soul on Fire – The Life and Music of Peter Steele was written by Metal Maniacs editor Jeff Wagner, and was released in 2013. None of the surviving band members cooperated with Wagner in the creation of the book.

== Death and tributes ==
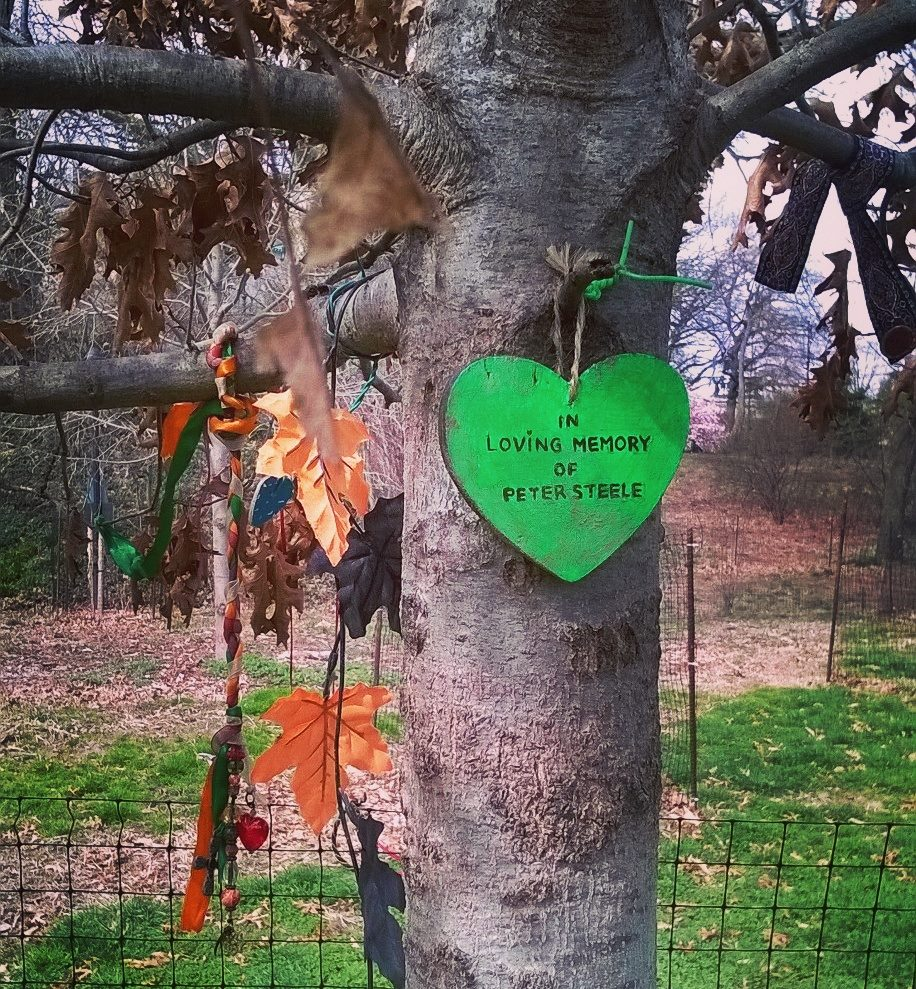
An oak tree, upon which fans have hung tributes, was planted in Steele's memory in 2011 in Brooklyn's Prospect Park.

Steele died of sepsis caused by diverticulitis (initially reported as heart failure) on April 14, 2010, at the age of 48. Prior to his death, he was preparing to write and record new music. The remaining members of Type O Negative decided to dissolve the band rather than replace Steele, with Johnny Kelly stating "Even if there is somebody who could take his place it wouldn't matter. We don't have any interest in continuing. It's impossible – it hasn't even come up in any kind of discussion. When Peter died, Type O Negative died with him."

In an interview, Steele noted that, as a result of his long lasting dependence on alcohol and cocaine, he had developed problems with some of his organs. He had stated:

I developed heart problems, I developed liver problems, I never had a stroke, I never had a heart attack and as Mark Twain put it, 'Rumours of my death have been highly exaggerated.'

=== Tributes ===
- On November 21, 2011, an oak tree was planted in Prospect Park to commemorate Steele.
- In 2011, the band Necrophagia dedicated the song "Trick R' Treat (The Last Halloween)" from the album Deathtrip 69 to the memory of Peter Steele.
- Following his death, the metal band Voyager penned a track entitled "Iron Dream" in memory of Steele, released on their 2011 album The Meaning of I.
- Lacuna Coil wrote the song "My Spirit" in memory of Steele for their 2012 album Dark Adrenaline.
- The Moonspell song "New Tears Eve", from the 2012 album Alpha Noir/Omega White, is dedicated to Steele.
- Biohazard dedicated their 2012 album Reborn in Defiance to Steele.
- Swallow the Sun wrote the song "April 14th" as a tribute to Steele for their 2012 album Emerald Forest and the Blackbird.
- Meridian Dawn recorded a cover version of the Type O Negative song "I Don't Wanna Be Me" in tribute to Steele for their 2014 debut release The Mixtape EP.
- The Crowbar song "Symbolic Suicide", from the 2014 album Symmetry in Black, is inspired by the legacy of Peter Steele.
- The band Danzig, featuring Steele's former bandmate Johnny Kelly, have dedicated live performances of the song "On a Wicked Night" to Steele.
- The rock band Starset released a cover of "Love You to Death".
- Doom metal quartet Pallbearer also covered "Love You to Death" on their 2016 EP Fear and Fury.
- In 2019, Trivium covered "I Don't Wanna Be Me" in memory of Steele.
- Oceans of Slumber covered "Wolf Moon" on their 2020 self-titled album.
- In 2024, Split Chain covered “I Don’t Wanna Be Me”.
- In 2025, Saint Avangeline released a cover of "Love You to Death".

== Discography ==
Fallout

- Untitled 7" single (1981)

Carnivore

Studio albums

- Carnivore (1985)
- Retaliation (1987)

Agnostic Front

Studio albums

- Cause for Alarm (1986) (Writer)

Type O Negative

Studio albums

- Slow, Deep and Hard (1991)
- The Origin of the Feces (1992)
- Bloody Kisses (1993)
- October Rust (1996)
- World Coming Down (1999)
- Life Is Killing Me (2003)
- Dead Again (2007)

Guest Appearances

- Whiplash, Power and Pain (Backing vocals)
- Tony Iommi, Iommi (Vocals & bass)
- Biohazard, Uncivilization (Vocals)
- Roadrunner United (Vocals & keyboards)
- Doro, Fight (Vocals)
- Brand New Sin, Tequila (Brand New Sin album) (vocals)
- Songs of the Witchblade (Vocals)
