= October Rust =

Studio album by Type O Negative
- Released: August 20, 1996
- Genre: Gothic metal
- Length: 72:49
- Label: Roadrunner
- Producers: Josh Silver, Peter Steele

Type O Negative chronology
| Bloody Kisses (1993) | October Rust (1996) | World Coming Down (1999) |

Singles from October Rust
- 1. "My Girlfriend's Girlfriend" Released: August 19, 1996; 2. "Love You to Death" Released: November 1996; 3. "Cinnamon Girl" Released: September 1997

October Rust is the fourth studio album by American gothic metal band Type O Negative. It was released in 1996. This is the first album with Johnny Kelly credited as the band's drummer, although programmed drums are used on the album. October Rust has more ballads and less of the doom metal sound of previous or subsequent albums. It also features a cover of "Cinnamon Girl” by Neil Young and Crazy Horse.

It is the first of the band's albums with a "joke intro"; in this case, "Bad Ground", which is 38 seconds of low-level buzzing, meant to sound as if one or more audio leads is incorrectly plugged into the input jacks of an amplifier. Tracks 2 and 15 are humorous untitled spoken word intros and outros to the album, respectively, with the band downplaying the recording of the album. Another production technique employed on the album is the use of very abrupt endings and segues to a few of the songs, heard on the tracks "Green Man", "Red Water", and "Haunted".

== Release and reception ==
Professional ratings
Review scores
| Source | Rating |
|---|---|
| AllMusic | 4/5 stars |
| Chicago Tribune | 3.5/4 stars |
| Chronicles of Chaos | 8/10 |
| Collector's Guide to Heavy Metal | 8/10 |
| Metal Storm | 7.5/10 |

October Rust was well received by critics. The album was released on August 20, 1996 on CD, LP and audiocassettes through Roadrunner Records. October Rust sold over 500,000 copies, eventually receiving a gold certification by the RIAA in the United States. The album was not as successful as its predecessor, Bloody Kisses, but it peaked at number 42 on the Billboard 200, and is considered the band's best album among fans. In celebration of the album's 25th anniversary, it was officially reissued on vinyl in 2021. The album was also released on vinyl in 2024 as a limited edition for the Rhino Records "Rocktober" campaign. Steve Huey of AllMusic gave the album 4 stars out of 5 and wrote: "Peter Steele predicted that the follow-up to Bloody Kisses would accentuate Type O Negative's melodic side, specifically for the purpose of making money. Steele's attempt at "pop-goth" actually works well for a while; his cynical take on goth rock's typical subject matter is in full swing over the first half of October Rust, and the band gleefully wallows in its stated commercialism by personally thanking the listener for purchasing the album at its start and finish." In 2017, former Black Sabbath drummer Bill Ward ranked October Rust as one of his favorite Metal albums of all time.

== Track listing ==
All tracks are written by Peter Steele, except where noted.

| No. | Title | Length |
|---|---|---|
| 1. | "Bad Ground" | 0:38 |
| 2. | " (Note: Untitled in the physical releases; named on streaming platforms as "(No Title) 'October Rust' Track 2 [Spoken Word Intro]".)" | 0:21 |
| 3. | "Love You to Death" | 7:08 |
| 4. | "Be My Druidess" | 5:25 |
| 5. | "Green Man" | 5:47 |
| 6. | "Red Water (Christmas Mourning)" | 6:48 |
| 7. | "My Girlfriend's Girlfriend" | 3:46 |
| 8. | "Die with Me" | 7:12 |
| 9. | "Burnt Flowers Fallen" | 6:09 |
| 10. | "In Praise of Bacchus" | 7:36 |
| 11. | "Cinnamon Girl" (Neil Young cover) | 4:00 |
| 12. | "The Glorious Liberation of the People's Technocratic Republic of Vinnland by the Combined Forces of the United Territories of Europa" | 1:07 |
| 13. | "Wolf Moon (Including Zoanthropic Paranoia)" | 6:37 |
| 14. | "Haunted" | 10:07 |
| 15. | " (Note: Untitled in the physical releases; named on streaming platforms as "(No Title) 'October Rust' Track 15 [Spoken Word Outro]".)" | 0:08 |
| Total length: | | 72:49 |

== Personnel ==
=== Type O Negative ===
- Peter Steele – lead vocals, bass guitar
- Kenny Hickey – guitars, backing vocals
- Josh Silver – keyboards, synthesizer, backing vocals
- Johnny Kelly – drum machine

=== Additional personnel ===
- Val Ium – backing vocals (on "In Praise of Bacchus")

=== Production ===
- Mike Marciano – recording engineer
- George Marino – mastering
- Sagmeister Inc. – cover art
- Tim Fitzharris – photography
- Joseph Cultice – photography
- Tobias Frere Jones – typography
- Laura Michaels – design

== Charts ==
| Chart (1996–21) | Peak position |
|---|---|
| Austrian Albums (Ö3 Austria) | 8 |
| Belgian Albums (Ultratop Flanders) | 33 |
| Dutch Albums (Album Top 100) | 21 |
| Finnish Albums (Suomen virallinen lista) | 7 |
| German Albums (Offizielle Top 100) | 5 |
| Hungarian Albums (MAHASZ) | 13 |
| Norwegian Albums (VG-lista) | 15 |
| Scottish Albums (Official Charts) | 56 |
| Swedish Albums (Sverigetopplistan) | 3 |
| Swiss Albums (Schweizer Hitparade) | 46 |
| UK Albums (Official Charts) | 26 |
| UK Rock & Metal Albums (Official Charts) | 3 |
| US Billboard 200 | 42 |

== Certifications ==
| Region | Certification | Certified units/sales |
|---|---|---|
| United States (RIAA) | Gold | 500,000^{^} |
^{^} Shipments figures based on certification alone.
