= Josh Silver =

American keyboardist (born 1962)

- Also known as: Nosferajew, G. I. Jew
- Born: Joshua Silver; November 14, 1962 (age 63)
- Origin: Brooklyn, New York City, U.S.
- Genres: Heavy metal, gothic metal, doom metal
- Occupations: Musician, record producer
- Instruments: Keyboards, synthesisers, sampler
- Years active: 1979–2010
- Formerly of: Type O Negative, Fallout, Original Sin
- Spouse: Justine Weiss-Silver
- Website: https://www.typeonegative.net

Josh Silver (born November 14, 1962) is an American retired musician who is the former keyboardist, producer, and backing vocalist of the gothic metal band Type O Negative. He joined the band at frontman Peter Steele's request and played for the band until they disbanded due to Steele's death in 2010.

Silver was also a founding member of the short-lived rock group Fallout along with Steele. Fallout gave birth to Carnivore which ultimately led to Type O Negative. After the breakup of Fallout, Silver formed the hard rock band Original Sin.

Silver was first introduced to professional recording and production upon meeting and working with producer and Soundscape Recording Studio owner Richard Termini. Fallout's earliest recordings trace back to the Termini Soundscape sessions from the late 1970s.

== Personal life ==
After the death of Type O Negative frontman Peter Steele, Silver became a certified EMT and then a paramedic in New York. As stated by Silver, for over a year this had been his "plan B" to support his wife and children. Assuming at the time that the band was finished, Silver had begun EMT schooling during Steele's 2008 hiatus. He still holds his paramedic position with the New York City Fire Department.

Silver married guitarist Kenny Hickey's wife's sister, making them brothers-in-law.

== Discography ==
=== Fallout ===
- Untitled 7" single (1981)

=== Type O Negative ===
- Slow, Deep and Hard (1991)
- The Origin of the Feces (1992)
- Bloody Kisses (1993)
- October Rust (1996)
- World Coming Down (1999)
- Life Is Killing Me (2003)
- Dead Again (2007)

=== Guest appearances ===
- Roadrunner United (2005) – Roads & Enemy of the State

=== Albums produced ===
- Life of Agony – River Runs Red (1993)
- Pist.On – Number One (1996)
- Sheer Terror - Old, New, Borrowed, And Blue (1994)
