= Kenny Hickey =

American guitarist and singer

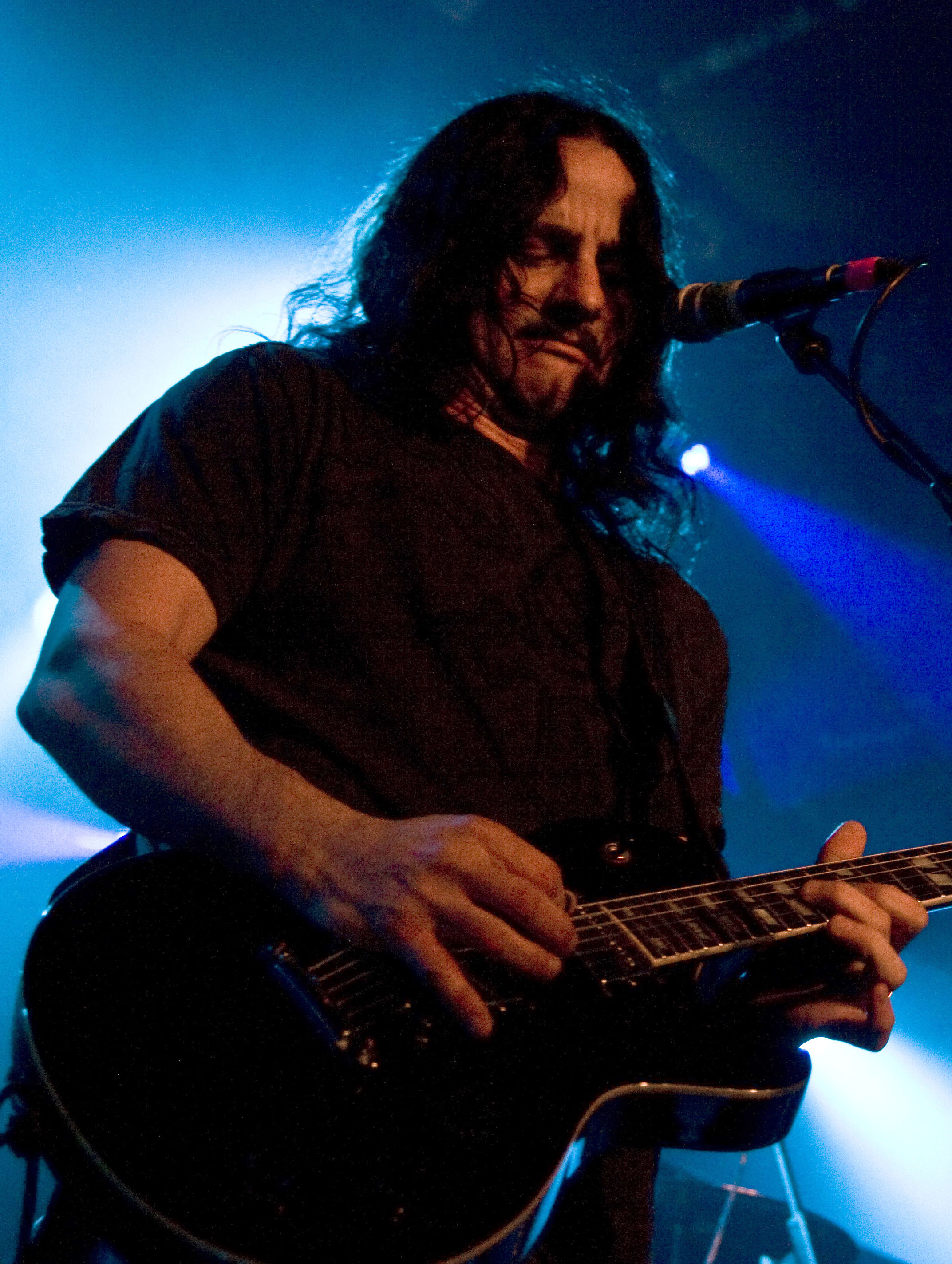
- Hickey performing with Seventh Void in 2010

Background information
- Born: Kenneth Hickey; May 22, 1966 (age 60); New York City, U.S.
- Genres: Heavy metal, gothic metal, doom metal
- Occupations: Musician, songwriter
- Instruments: Guitar, vocals
- Years active: 1989–present
- Member of: Silvertomb, Sun Dont Shine
- Formerly of: Type O Negative, Danzig, Seventh Void

Kenneth Hickey (born May 22, 1966) is an American musician. He was the guitarist, backing and occasional co-lead vocalist of the gothic metal band Type O Negative, whom he played for from 1989 until the death of the band's frontman and bassist Peter Steele in 2010. He is currently the lead vocalist and guitarist for the doom metal band Silvertomb and was the co-founder of the doom metal band Seventh Void. All three bands featured fellow Type O Negative member and close friend Johnny Kelly on drums. Hickey is also an occasional touring guitarist for the heavy metal band Danzig.

== Early career ==
Hickey was born in Brooklyn, New York City in 1966 and was raised in the Marine Park section of Brooklyn. As a youngster he listened to his father's records of Johnny Cash and was diverted into rock and roll after Elton John's album Goodbye Yellow Brick Road. He was asked to join Type O Negative after former Carnivore guitarist Marc Piovanetti declined. Hickey was a childhood friend of the band, growing up in the same neighborhood as the band members. Hickey graduated from Xaverian High School in 1984. He has been on every Type O Negative release with fellow members Peter Steele and Josh Silver (Johnny Kelly joined in 1994).

== Guitars and amplifiers ==
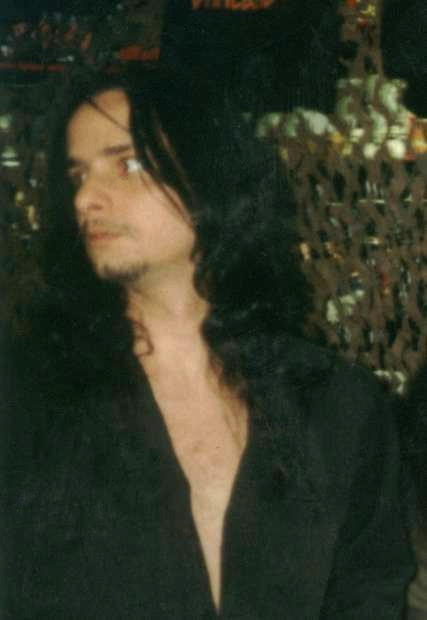
Hickey circa 1997

Hickey played a black Gibson Flying V in the early days of Type O Negative, as seen in the "Christian Woman" video. He then switched to a black Gibson SG, to which he added green accessories (knobs, pickups, and a green painted fretboard), a trend he would continue to follow. Starting in 1996, he used Fernandes Guitars, starting with a Raven Elite Sustainer and Revolver Sustainer with the same green additions as his previous SG. This would be his main guitar for over half a decade. He would always use the Raven live, and as seen on the music video for "I Don't Wanna Be Me", he could be seen using a Monterey Deluxe (without EMGs) in satin black, with green fingerboard inlays. In 2007, he began using Schecter guitars, most prominently a green C-1 Baritone. Unlike his previous guitars, this has true green inlays, exposed pickups (A Seymour Duncan SH-4 "JB" bridge, and a Sustainiac neck pickup), and the body, including the headstock, the back of the headstock and the back of the neck is entirely green. All Hickey's guitars have invariably been tuned to B Standard throughout his career.

Hickey's early rig (before World Coming Down) consisted of ADA MP-1 & MP-2 preamps or a Marshall JMP-1 with an Alesis Quadraverb running into Marshall 9005 and/or Mosvalve 500 power amps, which were run into one or more Marshall 4x12s w/ G12-75 speakers. During the recording of World Coming Down, Hickey used a Mesa/Boogie Dual Rectifier, and still uses it, along with a Mesa/Boogie Mark IV as a backup. His main setup consists of a Mesa/Boogie TriAxis preamp and TC Electronics G-Force effects processor being sent to a Mesa/Boogie Simul-Class 2: Ninety power amp into one or more Mesa/Boogie 4x12 cabinets. In the early days he may have used Dean Markley 10–52 gauged strings for B tuning. Today he uses Ernie Ball Not Even Slinky 12–56.

While performing with Seventh Void, he could be seen using Mesa/Boogie dual rectifiers and Schecter Solo-6 guitars in either a black finish (seen in the music video for "Last Walk In The Light"), or Sunburst (seen in the music video for "Heaven is Gone").

In late 2012, Schecter announced an artist model based on his custom baritone he used near the end of his Type O Negative tenure.

== Musical influences ==
In an interview with Loudwire, Hickey cited the image of Ace Frehley and his signature smoking guitar as one of his motivations to start playing the guitar. He also cited Elton John, Jimi Hendrix, T. Rex, Pink Floyd and Black Sabbath as musical influences.
