= Life of Agony discography =

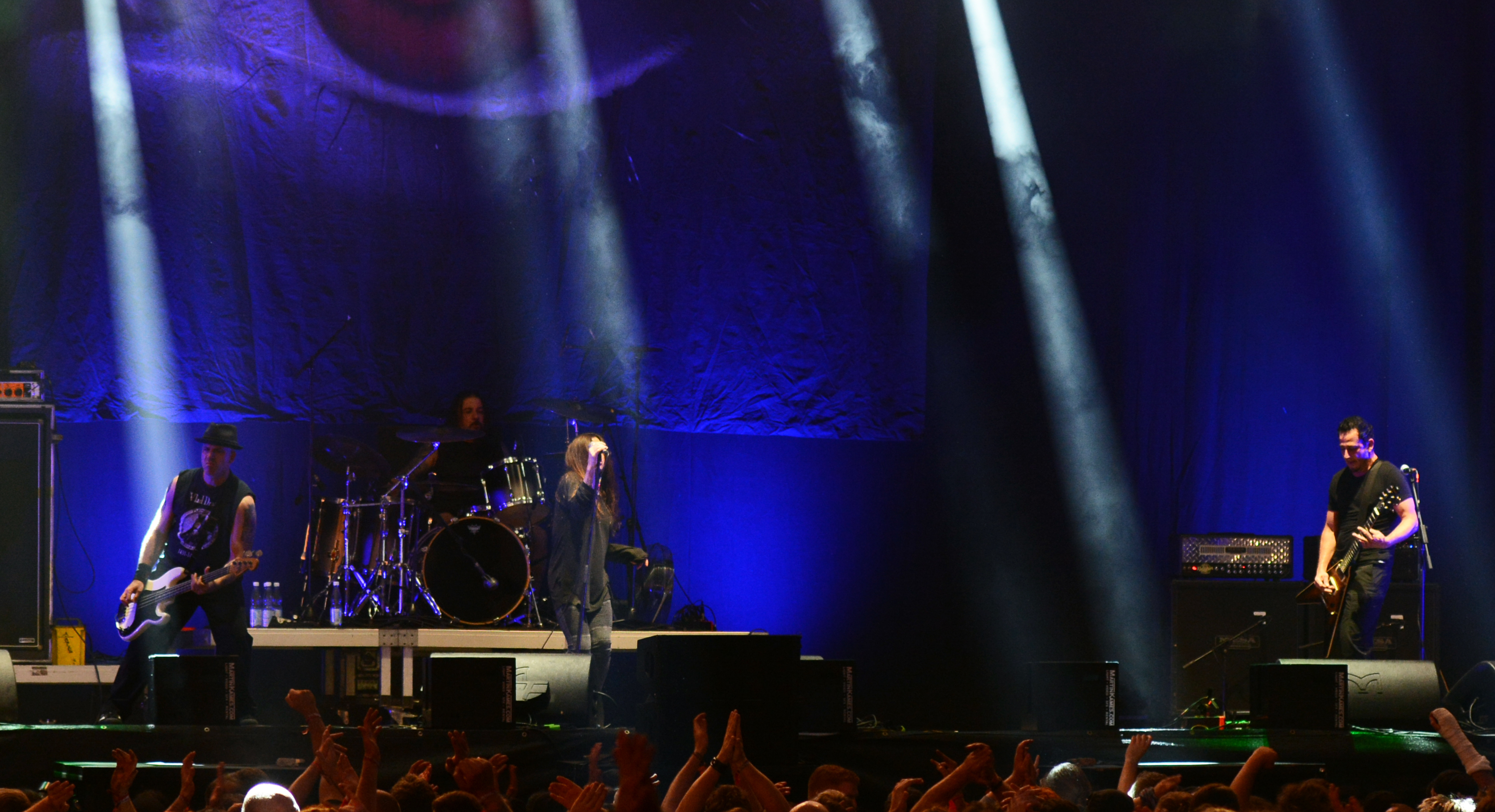
- Life of Agony at Reload Festival 2017
- Studio albums: 6
- Live albums: 3
- Compilation albums: 3
- Singles: 10
- Video albums: 1
- Music videos: 10
- Demos: 4

The discography of American rock band Life of Agony includes six studio albums, thee compilation albums, three live albums, one video album, ten singles, four demos and ten music videos.

== Albums ==
=== Studio albums ===
Year	Title	Chart peaks									Sales
Year	Title	US	US Heat.	AUT	BEL (FL)	BEL (WA)	GER	NLD	SWI	UK	Sales
1993	River Runs Red: Released: October 12, 1993; Label: Roadrunner; Formats: CD, CS, LP	—	—	—	—	—	71	—	—	—	US: 158,000
1995	Ugly: Released: October 10, 1995; Label: Roadrunner; Format: CD, CS, LP	153	8	—	23	—	39	79	—	116	US: 83,000
1997	Soul Searching Sun: Released: September 9, 1997; Label: Roadrunner; Format: CD, CS	157	9	—	34	—	12	16	—	111	US: 65,000
2005	Broken Valley: Released: June 14, 2005; Label: Epic; Format: CD, CD+DVD	147	4	36	39	—	44	49	—	—	US: 27,000
2017	A Place Where There's No More Pain: Released: April 28, 2017; Label: Napalm; Format: CD, LP	—	3	33	28	104	23	112	56	—	
2019	The Sound of Scars: Released: October 11, 2019; Label: Napalm; Format: CD, CS, LP	—	—	69	84	—	34	—	82	—	

=== Compilation albums ===
Year	Album	Label
1999	1989–1999	Roadrunner
2003	The Best Of	Roadrunner
2013	The Complete Roadrunner Collection 1993–2000	Roadrunner

=== Live albums ===
Year	Album	Label
2000	Unplugged at the Lowlands Festival '97	Roadrunner
2003	River Runs Again: Live 2003	Steamhammer
2010	20 Years Strong – River Runs Red: Live in Brussels	I Scream

=== Demo albums ===
Year	Album
1990	Death on the BMT
1990	Step Aside
1991	Depression
1991	The Stain Remains

== Singles ==
Year	Song	Chart peaks			Album
Year	Song	US Active Rock	US Main. Rock	UK	Album
1994	"Through and Through"	—	—	—	River Runs Red
1994	"This Time"	—	—	—	River Runs Red
1995	"Lost at 22"	—	—	—	Ugly
1996	"Let's Pretend"	—	—	—	Ugly
1997	"Weeds"	19	27	91	Soul Searching Sun
1997	"Desire"	—	—	—	Soul Searching Sun
1998	"Tangerine"	25	37	—	Soul Searching Sun
1998	"My Mind Is Dangerous"	—	—	—	Soul Searching Sun
2005	"Love to Let You Down"	22	25	—	Broken Valley
2019	"Scars"	—	—	—	The Sound of Scars
2024	"The Crow (In Memory of B.L.)"	—	—	—	Non-album single

== Music videos ==
- "Through and Through"
- "This Time"
- "Weeds"
- "Desire"
- "Love to Let You Down"
- "World Gone Mad"
- "Dead Speak Kindly"
- "Scars"
- "Lay Down"
- "Black Heart"
- "Stone" (lyric video)
