= Weeds (Life of Agony song) =

Single by Life of Agony

from the album Soul Searching Sun
- Released: September 1997
- Genre: Alternative metal; alternative rock
- Length: 4:07
- Label: Roadrunner
- Songwriter: Alan Robert
- Producers: Phil Nicolo; Life of Agony

Life of Agony singles chronology
"Let's Pretend" (1996)	"Weeds" (1997)	"Desire" (1997)

"Weeds" is a song by American alternative metal band Life of Agony. The song was released as the first single from the band's third studio album Soul Searching Sun.

The song is the band's first charting single, reaching no. 27 on the Billboard Mavinstream Rock chart and no. 91 on the UK Singles Chart. The maxi-single included three B-side tracks. "Weeds (Unplugged)" is a studio recorded, acoustic reworking of the single and "River Runs Red (Re-Zamped)" is a re-recording/re-make of the title track from the band's debut album. Both of these B-sides also appeared as bonus tracks on various limited editions of Soul Searching Sun. The third B-side, "How It Would Be '97", is a re-imagined, re-recording of "How It Would Be" from the band's second album Ugly. This track would later appear on the band's 1989-1999 compilation album.

== Track listing ==
CD single

No.	Title	Writer(s)	Length
1.	"Weeds" (Edit)	Robert	3:36
2.	"Weeds" (Unplugged)	Robert	4:36
3.	"River Runs Red" (Re-Zamped)	Caputo, Zampella, Robert	3:28
4.	"How It Would Be '97"	Caputo	5:47

7" single

Side A
No.	Title	Writer(s)	Length
1.	"Weeds" (Edit)	Robert	3:36

Side B
No.	Title	Writer(s)	Length
1.	"Tangerine" (Re-Zep; Led Zeppelin cover)	Page	3:27

== Chart positions ==
Chart (1997)	Peak position
US Active Rock (Billboard)	19
US Mainstream Rock (Billboard)	27
UK Singles Chart (Official Charts Company)	91
UK Rock and Metal Singles (Official Charts Company)	5

== Personnel ==
Life of Agony

- Keith Caputo – vocals
- Joey Z. – guitar
- Alan Robert – bass
- Dan Richardson – drums
