= Unplugged at the Lowlands Festival '97 =

Live album by Life of Agony
- Released: August 22, 2000
- Recorded: February 25, 1994 – August 24, 1997
- Genre: Acoustic rock; alternative rock; alternative metal; groove metal
- Length: 73:08
- Label: Roadrunner
- Producer: Life of Agony

Life of Agony chronology
| Soul Searching Sun (1997) | Unplugged at the Lowlands Festival '97 (2000) | The Best of Life of Agony (2003) |

Unplugged at the Lowlands Festival '97 is a live album released by Life of Agony in 2000 through Roadrunner Records.

The first 8 tracks were recorded live at the Lowlands Festival in Holland on August 23, 1997. Tracks 9 to 15 are bonus tracks: track 9 is a previously unreleased studio track, track 10 was recorded live on August 24, 1997 in Cologne, Germany, and tracks 11 to 15 were recorded live on February 25, 1994 in Asbury Park, NJ.

== Track listing ==
| No. | Title | Length |
|---|---|---|
| 1. | "Introduction" | 1:42 |
| 2. | "How It Would Be" | 6:42 |
| 3. | "Angry Tree" | 5:35 |
| 4. | "Weeds" | 7:50 |
| 5. | "Desire" | 5:04 |
| 6. | "My Mind Is Dangerous" | 6:40 |
| 7. | "Let's Pretend" | 5:25 |
| 8. | "River Runs Red" | 3:42 |
| 9. | "Other Side of the River" (David Thoener Remix) | 4:10 |
| 10. | "Seasons" | 5:27 |
| 11. | "Plexiglass Gate" | 2:21 |
| 12. | "Respect" | 4:38 |
| 13. | "This Time" | 6:03 |
| 14. | "Method of Groove" | 4:48 |
| 15. | "My Eyes" | 2:54 |
| Total length: | | 73:08 |

== Personnel ==
Life of Agony

- Mina Caputo – lead vocals
- Joey Z. – guitar, backing vocals
- Alan Robert – bass, backing vocals
- Dan Richardson – drums (tracks 1 to 8, 10)
- Sal Abruscato – drums (tracks 9, 11 to 15)
