= Broken Valley =

Studio album by Life of Agony
- Released: June 14, 2005
- Recorded: April – December 2004
- Studio: Sunset Sound Recorders & Westlake Audio, Los Angeles
- Genre: Alternative metal; grunge; hard rock
- Length: 43:38
- Label: Epic
- Producer: Greg Fidelman

Life of Agony chronology
Soul Searching Sun (1997)	Broken Valley (2005)	A Place Where There's No More Pain (2017)

Singles from Broken Valley
- 1. "Love to Let You Down" Released: March 21, 2005

Broken Valley is the fourth studio album by American alternative metal band Life of Agony. The album was released in the US on June 14, 2005, through Epic Records and in the UK on October 17, 2005, through Hassel Records. It is the band's first album in eight years, following 1997's Soul Searching Sun, and first with the band's classic, original line-up since Ugly in 1995. Epic Records elected not to issue Broken Valley in the United Kingdom upon initial release. However, the album was eventually released in the UK on October 17, 2005 through Sony BMG Music Entertainment under exclusive UK license to Hassel Records. This Hassle Records limited edition included a special bonus DVD along with a previously unreleased exclusive bonus track from the Broken Valley recording sessions titled "DNR."

== Commercial performance ==
Professional ratings
Review scores
Source	Rating
AllMusic	4/5 stars
Blabbermouth	8/10
Drowned in Sound	9/10

Broken Valley debuted at number 147 on the Billboard 200, selling 7,689 copies in its first week. However, the album quickly fell off the charts, and by December 2005 it had only sold 28,000 copies in the US.

The album's sales in the US were also damaged by the Sony BMG copy protection rootkit scandal, and was one of the affected albums selected for recall from retailers in November 2005. Like the other affected artists, Sony BMG resolutely refused to compensate the band.

== Track listing ==
All tracks are written by Life of Agony.

No.	Title	Length
1.	"Love to Let You Down"	3:40
2.	"Last Cigarette"	2:56
3.	"Wicked Ways"	4:02
4.	"Don't Bother"	3:30
5.	"Strung Out"	3:59
6.	"Junk Sick"	3:18
7.	"The Calm That Disturbs You"	3:15
8.	"No One Survives"	1:34
9.	"Justified"	6:21
10.	"The Day He Died"	3:19
11.	"Broken Valley"	5:17
12.	"Room 244"	2:22
Total length:		43:38

UK Limited Edition (Hassle Records)
No.	Title	Length
13.	"DNR" (Exclusive UK Only Bonus Track)	2:20
Total length:		45:58

== Bonus DVD ==
Several versions of the album were accompanied by a DVD, in which the band discussed their break-up and why they got back together.

The DVD includes several easter eggs such as a studio rehearsal of "Junk Sick" and backstage footage.

== Personnel ==
Life of Agony

- Keith Caputo – lead vocals
- Joey Z. – guitar, backing vocals
- Alan Robert – bass, backing vocals, cover design
- Sal Abruscato – drums

Additional

- Greg Fidelman – producer
- Tony Zeller – engineer
- Johnny Fairfax – engineer
- Kevin Dean – engineer
- Ted Jensen – mastering
- Myriam Santos-Kayda – photography

== Charts ==
Chart (2005)	Peak position
Austria (Ö3 Top 40)	36
Belgium Flanders (Ultratop)	39
Germany (GfK Entertainment)	44
Netherlands (Dutch Top 100)	49
US Billboard 200	147
US US Heatseekers (Billboard)	4

=== Singles charts ===
Song	Chart (2005)	Peak position
"Love to Let You Down"	US Mainstream Rock	25
