= The Beauty of Horror =

Adult coloring book series

Volume 1

The Beauty of Horror is a horror-themed adult coloring book series created by Life of Agony bassist Alan Robert and published by IDW Publishing. and distributed by Penguin Random House.

The book's mascot is a character called Ghouliana. In 2025, NECA released an action figure based on the character.

== Overview ==
The creator Alan Robert stated that he started his coloring book series after coming home from a tour with Life of Agony in 2016 and joined his daughter and wife to color, stating "I wanted to color, but I really just couldn't find anything that I would want to invest the time in, and my wife said, 'You should just draw your own,'" "That sparked the idea of making something that would appeal to me, and of course it had to be the most disgusting thing that I could think of."

Volume one of the series was released in September 2016 and Nerdist called it "The World's Creepiest Adult Coloring Book". There are currently six books in the series with titles including The Beauty of Horror 2: Ghouliana's Creepatorium, The Beauty of Horror 3: Haunted Playgrounds, The Beauty of Horror 4: Creature Feature, The Beauty of Horror: Ghosts of Christmas, The Beauty of Horror: Tricks And Treats, and The Beauty of Horror: Haunt This Journal.

The Beauty of Horror 5: Haunt of Fame coloring book was released on 10, 2021. "It's like a twisted wax museum filled with all of my favorite pop culture stars," said Beauty of Horror creator Alan Robert. "Similar to how Ghouliana took on horror icons in the last book, this time she tackles rock royalty, sports heroes, and famous faces from TV and film. It's a bizarre mashup that's equally horrific as it is hilarious. I really can't wait to see what coloring fans do with these freaky designs!" The Beauty of Horror 6: Famous Monsterpieces Coloring Book was released in 2023.

In September of 2024, Robert released a coloring book based on the movie Beetlejuice.

The most recent installment The Beauty of Horror 7: Backwards Records was released in early 2025, this book featured 80 pages of horror-infused parodies of iconic album covers.

In 2025, Robert announced that he would be releasing a special edition book based on The Conjuring Universe. It was officially released on March 24, 2026.

== Reception ==
In 2018, a claymation video based on the Christmas edition went viral with over 7 million views.

A set of colorable tarot cards was featured on SyFy's Metal Crush program and was published on June 15, 2021.

Rooster Teeth Studios announced in Variety that it had partnered with Eric Heisserer's production company Chronology and Beauty of Horror creator Alan Robert to develop an animated series based on the bestselling books.
