= Keith Caputo =

American singer

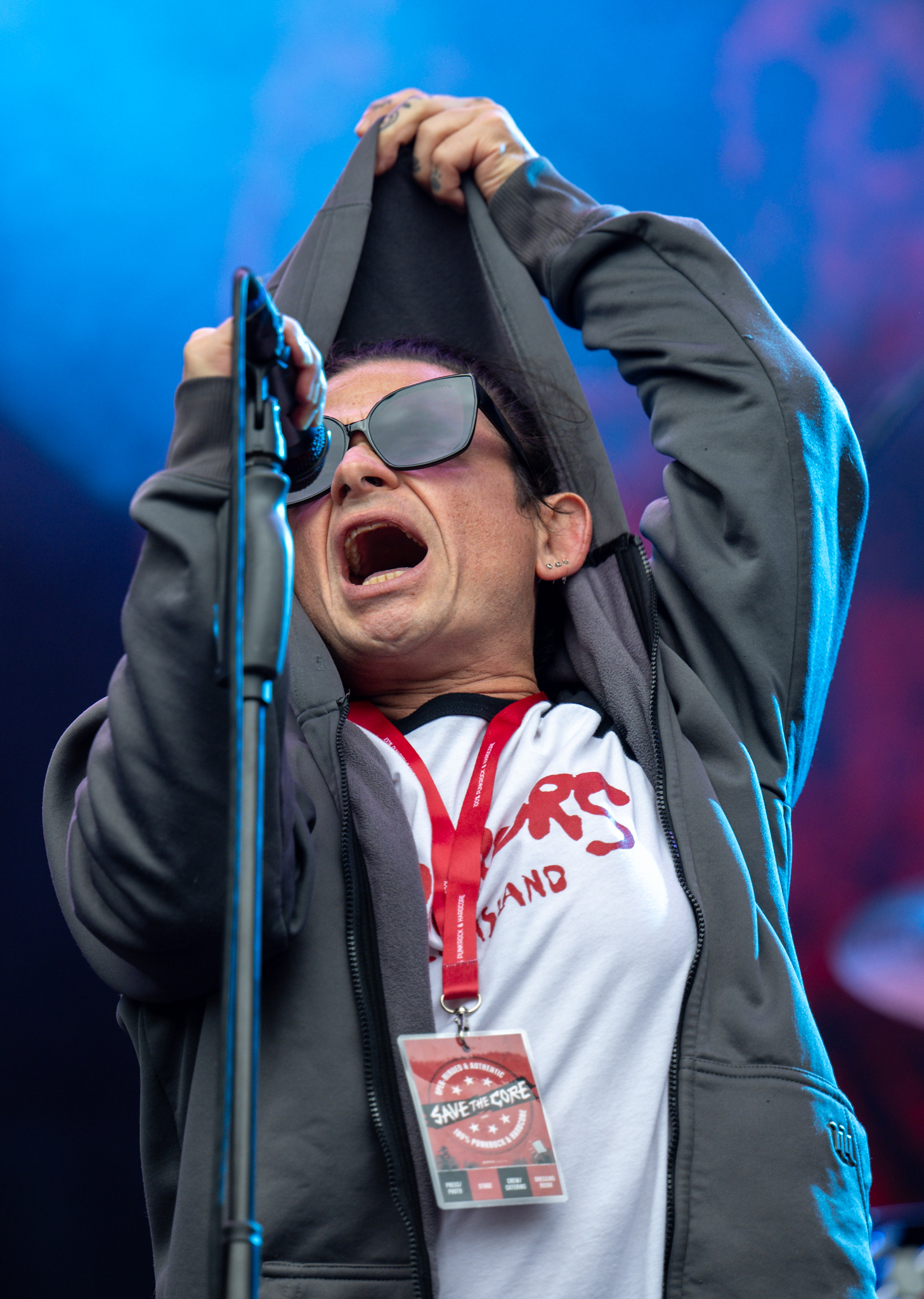
- Caputo with Life of Agony in 2024

Background information
- Also known as: Mina Caputo (2011–2024)
- Born: December 4, 1973 (age 52); Brooklyn, New York, U.S.
- Genres: Alternative metal; hard rock; heavy metal; post-grunge
- Occupations: Singer; songwriter
- Years active: 1989–present
- Member of: Life of Agony; The Neptune Darlings
- Formerly of: Freax; Absolute Bloom
- Website: keithcaputoofficial.com

Keith Caputo (born December 4, 1973) is an American singer who is lead vocalist and a founding member of New York City alternative metal band Life of Agony. Formed in 1989, Life of Agony has released six studio albums, the latest of which, The Sound of Scars, was released in 2019. Caputo came out as transgender in 2011 and transitioned to female. In November 2024, Caputo announced he would be detransitioning back to male. During the interim period, he identified as Mina Caputo.

== Early life ==
Keith Caputo was born on December 4, 1973, in Brooklyn, New York. Both his parents were of Italian-American descent. Both of his parents struggled with heroin addiction, and when he was an infant, his mother died of a heroin overdose and his father (who died in 2002 from similar causes) put Caputo under the care of his grandparents, who lived in Mill Basin, Brooklyn, which is where he was raised. Caputo's upbringing was difficult, and his grandfather physically abused him and his grandmother. Despite the physical abuse, Caputo has since forgiven his grandfather; "My grandfather made up for how confused he made me as a kid. He only tried his best and forgiveness is present. I don't blame anyone." Between living with his grandparents, Caputo would also spend time with his cousin, Joseph Zampella (aka Joey Z.), who lived next door, where they would hang out together. Keith also took an interest in playing and studying classical piano.

From a young age, Caputo suffered from gender dysphoria but had to keep quiet about it. "My grandmother used to dress me to go to school, and I asked her, 'Why can't you dress me in girls' clothes?' She says, 'You're not a girl. Don't tell Grandpa you want to dress up as a girl and go to school. He'll fucking kill you. He'll kill me.'"

== Career ==
=== Life of Agony (1989–1997) ===
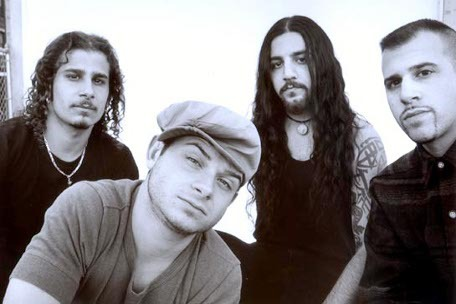
Caputo (second from left) with Life of Agony in the mid-1990s

Caputo started Life of Agony in 1989 with guitarist Joey Z. and bassist Alan Robert. Drummer Sal Abruscato was recruited soon afterwards. After signing with Roadrunner Records, they debuted with the 1993 album, River Runs Red. Shortly after the release of a third album Soul Searching Sun, Caputo left the band in September 1997. Caputo was struggling with internalized gender dysphoria and was becoming disillusioned with the masculine image of himself he was faking at the time. "What good is my success if I can't even enjoy my fucking soul and my body?' I wanted to come out then, but failed miserably and didn't have the courage or the knowhow. I didn't know what to do." Caputo decided to distance himself from the band completely; "It took me to quit the band because I wasn't being true to myself. I had to get away from my band, the label, everyone I worked with."

=== Solo career, Died Laughing and other activity (1997–2003) ===
Following his departure from Life of Agony, Caputo formed a short-lived band called Absolute Bloom, which broke up in July 1998. Caputo also guested on the track "Free Speech (Will Cost You)", which appears on the album Memory Rendered Visible by the band Both Worlds (featuring ex-Cro-Mags vocalist John Joseph), released on Roadrunner Records in April 1998.

Soon after these events, Caputo started work on a solo album, called Died Laughing. The album was released by Roadrunner Records on October 21, 1999, with an acoustic version of the album, Died Laughing Pure, being released on January 9, 2001. The album received generally positive reviews, with Blabbermouth.net giving the record a 9/10 stating “Keith Caputo's first solo release constitutes a brilliantly dark collection of infectiously memorable tunes that will remain with you long after you've finished listening to this CD.” Despite this the album was not a success, and Caputo has been heavily critical of Roadrunner's promotion of Died Laughing, and in a 2005 interview to Blistering.com said that Roadrunner "destroyed" his album's success. Despite his criticism of the label, he later returned to contribute vocals for "Tired n' Lonely" on Roadrunner United: The All Star Sessions in celebration of the label's 25th anniversary.

After leaving Roadrunner, Caputo was recruited as the vocalist of the Brazilian industrial metal band Freax, which had reformed after being broken up for over ten years. They released a self-titled album in 2003.

=== Return to Life of Agony and other solo material (2003–2011) ===
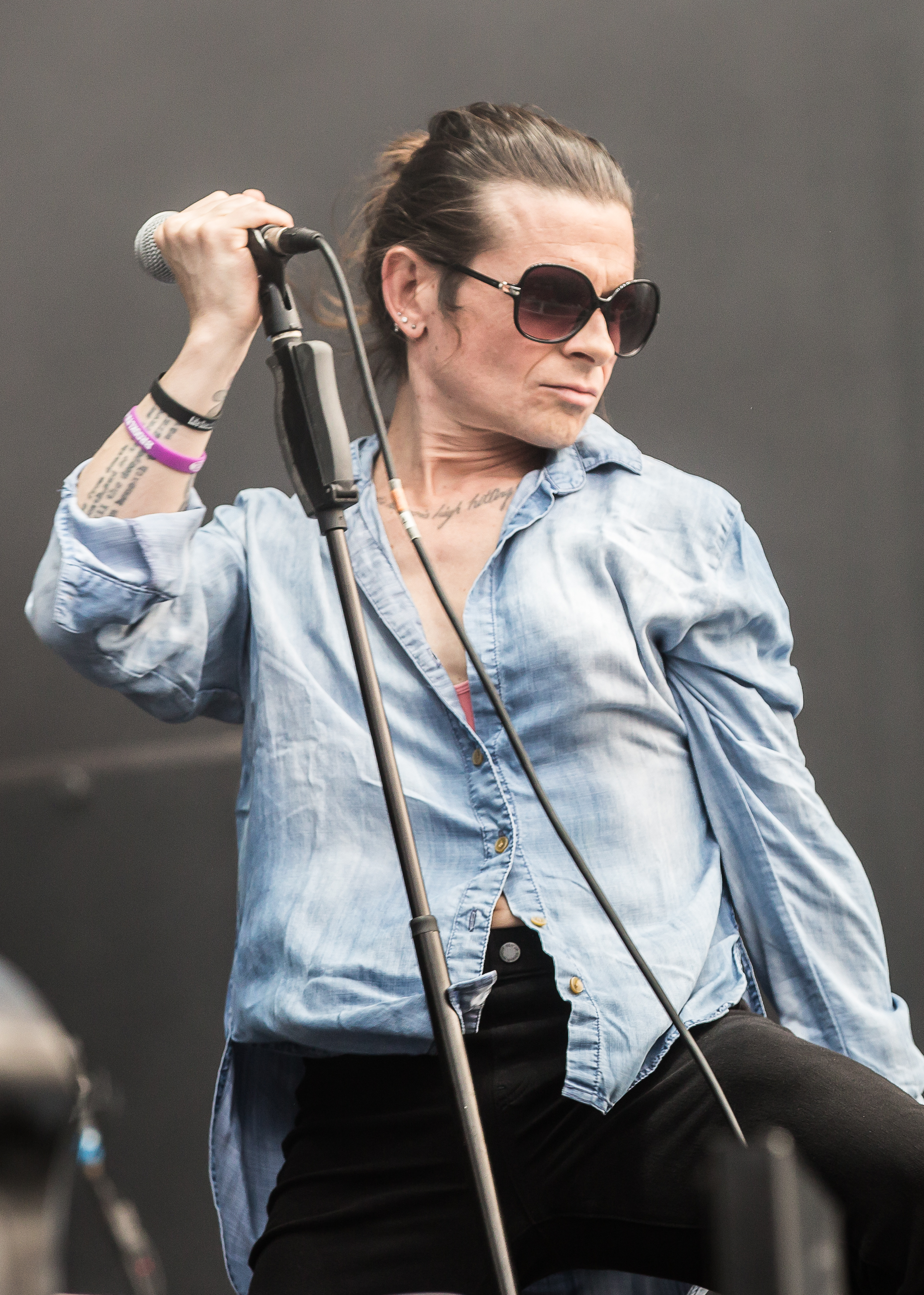
Caputo with Life of Agony in 2018

The original lineup of Life of Agony reunited for two sold-out shows at New York's Irving Plaza on January 3 and 4, 2003. The reunion resulted in several more shows and appearances on European festivals, as well as the recording of Broken Valley (2005).

In 2003, Caputo formed a group consisting of New York musicians Mike Shaw (bass) and Dan Platt (guitars), along with Dutch musicians Jochem Van Rooijen (drums) and Jack Pisters (lead guitars) that toured and recorded what became the album Live Monsters (2004). On May 1, 2006, Caputo released his third solo album Hearts Blood on Your Dawn which was only sold at his live shows, via mail order through his website, and in the iTunes Store. Caputos song “Got Monsters” was later used in Season 4, Episode 6 of the British television show Being Human.

In 2007, Caputo recorded his fourth solo album, A Fondness for Hometown Scars, which includes a guest appearance by Flea (of the Red Hot Chili Peppers) on trumpet, amongst others. Tom from Punk Rock Theory gave the album a 7.5/10 stating “While the track listing may feel a little awkward at times with those two barnburners thrown in there and while not every song is worth remembering, this is still a damn good album from a guy that is not only blessed with a beautiful voice but also with some solid songwriting skills.” Caputo participated as a guest singer on Dutch symphonic metal band Within Temptation's track "What Have You Done", the first single (and second track) from their 2007 album The Heart of Everything.

In 2008, he toured in support of this release, with a band composed of Dutch musicians Ryan Oldcastle (guitars), Axel van Oort (bass), and Jochem van Rooijen (drums). The album was produced by Martyn LeNoble and was released in Europe in April 2008 by Dutch label, Suburban Records.

In 2009, Caputo released a 6 song EP which featured covers of Cyndi Lauper, Lou Reed and Antony And The Johnsons along with 3 original tracks.

=== Recent activity (2011–present) ===
In 2011, Caputo formed a side project with Ryan Oldcastle and Michael Shaw called The Neptune Darlings, and released an album on September 15, 2011, called Chestnuts & Fireflies. The style of this CD has been called "geek rock" by The Advocate magazine. That same year Life of Agony disbanded once again just in the midst of Caputo coming out as transgender however his bandmate Alan Robert told Revolver Magazine "I actually don't think [Keith]'s transition is the ultimate reason the band isn't active right now. We'd been doing a lot less touring over the last bunch of years, way before [he] announced [his] personal news.

In 2013 Caputo made her debut as Mina with the 2013 solo album As Much Truth As One Can Bear, Caputo also played a couple of live shows in support of the album.

In 2014, Life of Agony re-formed with Caputo singing, they performed their first show since Caputo's gender confirmation at the Alcatraz Hard Rock & Metal Festival in Kortrijk, Belgium on August 8. In 2016 Caputo released another solo album called Love Hard.

They released their first album in 12 years titled A Place Where There's No More Pain in 2017. They then released the sequel to River Runs Red titled The Sound of Scars in 2019 with Veronica Bellino replacing longtime drummer Sal Abruscato. Caputo’s most recent studio album The Mones was released in 2020, Cryptic Rock gave the album a 4/5 stating “Coupling her genre-bending with dark allure, the talented front-lady serves up a collection that feels grandiose and cinematic, worthy of a David Lynch flick, yet still deeply intimate and full of incendiary passion.”

In 2022 A documentary film, also titled The Sound of Scars, was released by Cinedigm in association with Raven Banner Entertainment in 2022. The film was directed by Leigh Brooks and included interviews with Caputo and the rest of the band members and their families. The film also included archival footage, photographs, lost interviews, and go over various points of the band's history, including Caputo's gender transition.

In November 2024 Caputo started detransitioning and started going by the name Keith again, stating in a video “I’ve cured my gender dysphoria. It took many years, a lot of walking through the fire, but I rose above my misunderstandings of my soul and my spirit. I just wanted to share with you guys, once again, that I am off hormone therapy six, seven years when ‘A Place Where There’s No More Pain’ was made with LIFE OF AGONY. That was in 2016. And I’ve been existing in a different version of myself and a more healed version of myself.

In January 2025 Caputo, along with the rest of Life of Agony, was inducted into The Metal Hall of Fame. In November 2025, Caputo announced he would be touring Europe alongside his cousin Joey Z in celebration of the 25th anniversary of his album Died Laughing. The tour took place in March 2026.

== Personal life ==
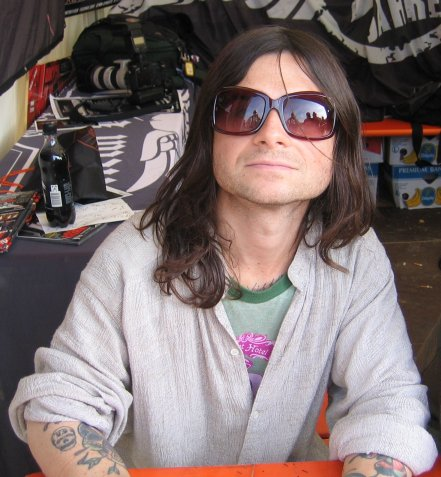
Caputo in 2009

In July 2011, Caputo came out as transgender and assumed the name Mina Caputo. For a while, his legal name was Keith Mina Caputo. "When I was Keith, I certainly wouldn't allow myself to be as flowery or as vulnerable as I do now," said Caputo in a 2016 interview that appeared on the music website No Echo. "I'm a fucking sissy, get over it [laughs]! I no longer have this masculinity or this manhood to protect. This is a transformation I've been dreaming of my entire life."

In 2017, Caputo said he was attracted to and would like to marry another man.

In November 2024, Caputo announced he was in the process of detransitioning, saying "I am a man. I always was a man" and that he had healed from gender dysphoria. He had stopped using hormones years prior, calling them "disgusting" and that he suffered from "many side effects". He added that he was "very against transitioning children medically and especially surgically". He said he was glad Donald Trump won the 2024 United States presidential election due to his campaign promise to ban sex reassignment and cross-sex hormones for minors.

== Discography ==
=== Solo ===
==== Albums ====
- Died Laughing (1999)
- Died Laughing Pure (2000) (acoustic versions)
- Perfect Little Monsters (2003)
- Live Monsters (2004) (Live performances)
- Heart's Blood on Your Dawn (2006)
- A Fondness for Hometown Scars (2008)
- Dass-Berdache / Essential Rarities and Demo Cuts (2008)
- Cheat (EP) (2009)
- As Much Truth as One Can Bear (2013)
- Love Hard (2016)
- The Mones (2020)

==== Singles ====
- "Selfish" (1999)
- "New York City" (2000)
- "Why" (2001)

=== Life of Agony ===
==== Albums ====
- River Runs Red (1993)
- Ugly (1995)
- Soul Searching Sun (1997)
- 1989-1999 (1999)
- Unplugged at the Lowlands Festival '97 (2000)
- The Best of Life of Agony (2003)
- River Runs Again: Live (CD/DVD) (2003) (Live)
- Broken Valley (2005)
- A Place Where There's No More Pain (2017)
- The Sound of Scars (2019)

=== Absolute Bloom ===
- Demo (1998)

=== Freax ===
- Freax (2002)

=== The Neptune Darlings ===
- Chestnuts & Fireflies (2011)

=== Guest appearances ===
- "Free Speech (Will Cost You)" (with Both Worlds) (1998)
- "Red Ball in Blue Sky" (with Edenbridge) (2003)
- "Tired 'n Lonely" (with Roadrunner United) (vocals and piano) (2005)
- "What Have You Done" (with Within Temptation) (2007)
- Additional vocals on A Pale Horse Named Death's 2010 album And Hell Will Follow Me, a project by fellow LoA member Sal Abruscato
- "IDA" (with Gator Bait Ten) (vocals) (2014), a project by Science Slam Sonic Explorers
