= Alan Robert =

American bassist (born 1971)

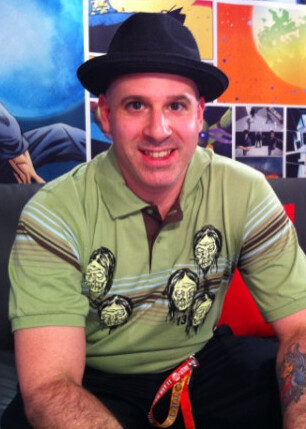
- Robert in February 2013

Background information
- Born: 1971 (age 54–55); Brooklyn, New York, U.S.
- Genres: Alternative metal
- Occupations: Musician; songwriter; comic book creator
- Instrument: Bass guitar
- Member of: Life of Agony

Alan Robert (born 1971) is an American musician and comic book creator. He is the bassist and main songwriter for the alternative metal band Life of Agony, whom he has played for since 1989. Robert is also known for his work on the graphic novels Wire Hangers, Crawl to Me, and Killogy, as well as the horror-themed adult coloring book series The Beauty of Horror.

== Career ==
Robert graduated with a Bachelor of Fine Arts from New York's School of Visual Arts, where he studied cartooning under teacher Walter Simonson.

=== Music ===
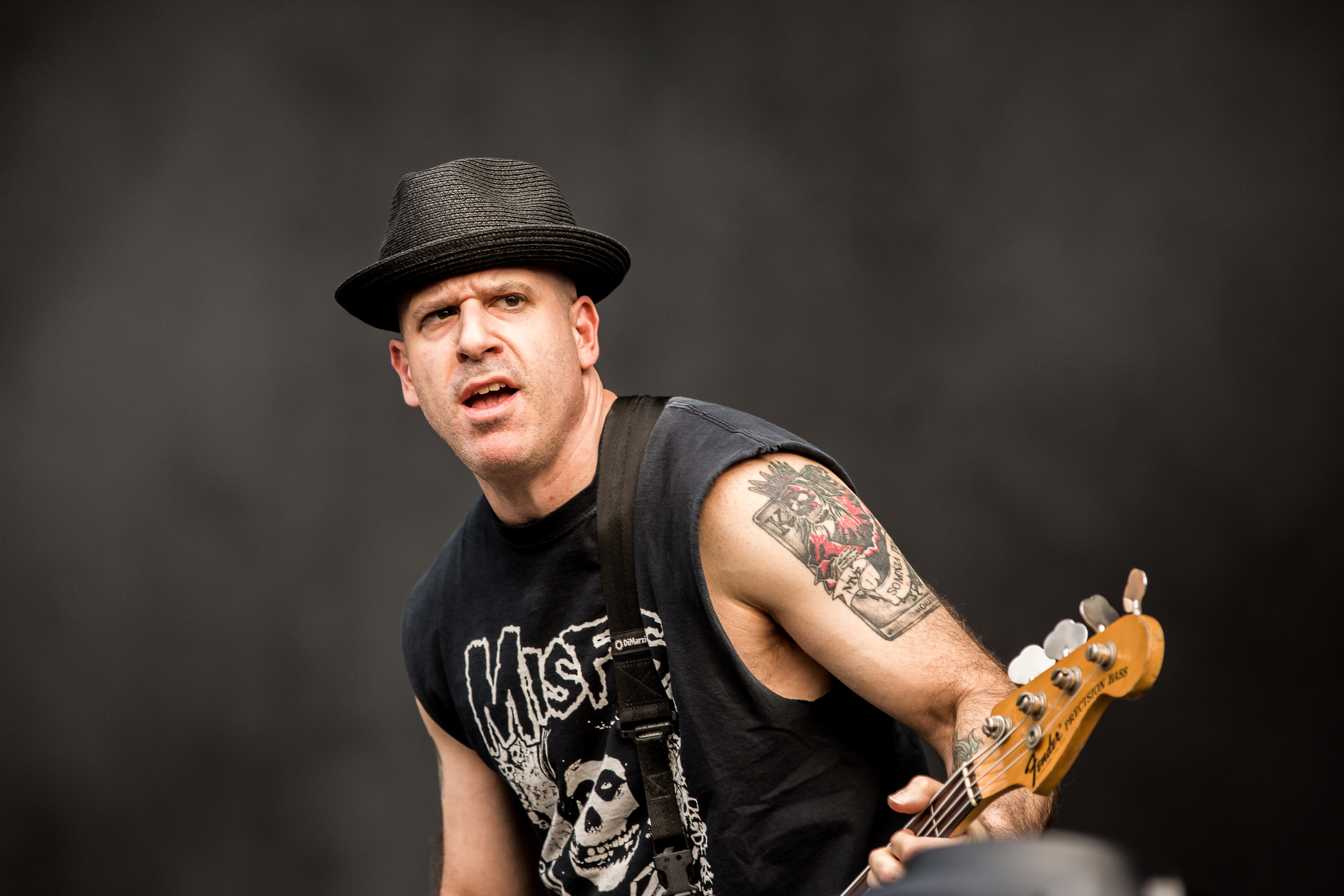
Robert with Life of Agony at With Full Force 2018

Robert is credited as being one of the original members of the Brooklyn, NY-based band, Life of Agony, in 1989, and is the band's primary songwriter. Robert started Life of Agony with guitarist Joey Z. and Keith Caputo, Sal Abruscato was recruited soon afterwards. After signing with Roadrunner Records, they debuted with the 1993 album, River Runs Red. This was followed up by 1995s Ugly and Soul Searching Sun in 1997. Caputo left the band later that same year due to mental health problems, the band toured Whitfield Crane as a replacement but eventually broke up due to not wanting to continue without Caputo. On January 3 and 4, 2003, the original lineup reunited for two sold-out shows at New York's Irving Plaza. Then releasing Broken Valley in 2005.

Robert has also done artwork/art direction for all Life of Agony albums along with doing additional work for Biohazard, Keith Caputos solo albums. He also created merchandise designs for both Pantera and Black Sabbath.

In 2006, Robert announced the creation of a punk rock band Spoiler NYC, which he formed with long-time friend, "Junkyard" Silletti and Tommy Clayton. The band released the full-length record Greasefire in Hell's Kitchen in 2008 and toured Europe with Life of Agony. Best known for their high-energy live shows which regularly feature dedications to their merchandise coordinator, Guy Bannister, Spoiler NYC released two songs in 2009.

In 2011 Life of Agony disbanded once again in the midst of Caputo coming out as transgender however his Robert told Revolver Magazine "I actually don't think [Keith]'s transition is the ultimate reason the band isn't active right now. We'd been doing a lot less touring over the last bunch of years, way before [he] announced [his] personal news. In 2014, Life of Agony re-formed once again with Caputo singing, they performed their first show since Caputo's gender confirmation at the Alcatraz Hard Rock & Metal Festival in Kortrijk, Belgium on August 8.

In 2016, Robert and the other original members of Life of Agony announced they would be releasing their first new album in over eleven years, "A Place Where There's No More Pain" on Napalm Records. The album (the fifth release by Life of Agony) was released worldwide on April 28, 2017. The album debuted at No. 24 on Billboard's Hard Rock Albums chart, and received critical acclaim from Rolling Stone, Kerrang, Revolver, and several other high-profile music reviewers. Alan, along with the rest of the band, announced several concerts in the United States and Europe to support the album.

Robert's and the band announced the release, in October 2019, of its sixth studio album The Sound of Scars on Napalm Records, which acts as "Chapter Two" to their classic debut River Runs Red. The concept album, hailed by Loudwire as one of the year's "Most Anticipated Hard Rock & Metal Albums", was produced & mixed by Grammy Award-winning producer Sylvia Massy and co-produced by Joey Z. Howie Weinberg handled mastering duties.

On August 9, 2019, the hit single "Scars" premiered on Billboard the song went to the number 1 spot on Music Choice with 2.44 million listeners.

In 2022 A documentary film, also titled The Sound of Scars, was released by Cinedigm in association with Raven Banner Entertainment in 2022. The film was directed by Leigh Brooks and included interviews with Robert and the rest of the band members and their families. The film also included archival footage, photographs, lost interviews, and go over various points of the band's history.

In January 2025 Robert along with the rest of Life of Agony were inducted into The Metal Hall of Fame.

=== Comics work ===
Robert is currently active in the comic book industry, having first created a four-part horror/conspiracy miniseries, Wire Hangers, which he also wrote and illustrated. The series was published in 2010 by IDW Publishing.

The first issue of the comic series won ComicMonsters.com's 2010 Best Cover Award.

On March 29, 2011, Alan Robert announced a live action feature film version of the Wire Hangers graphic novel, which to be produced by Robert's production company, Wasted Talent Entertainment" in connection with Zam Entertainment.

Robert announced the four-issue miniseries, Crawl To Me, which was published by IDW Publishing, whose story follows a young family who are confronted with a series of disturbing events in their rural home. The first issue was released in July 2011.

The series won the Mini-Series of the Year from ComicMonsters.com and TheSickHouse.net's 2011 Golden Gore Award for Best Graphic Novel.

The first printing of Crawl To Me sold out within a week of its publication and a second printing was quickly announced. A hardcover version, titled Crawl to Me: Evil Edgar Edition was later released in various formats. At the same time, Robert announced that a full-length movie based on the graphic novel was in the works. Screenwriters T.J. Cimfel and David White signed on shortly afterwards to adapt a screenplay based on the property. In December 2012, IDW Limited released two limited-run hardcover versions of the comic series in a black and red label options, featuring original artwork by Alan Robert included within each package.

On December 29, 2011, Robert appeared on second series premiere of the TLC television show, NY Ink, in the episode "Kings of NY", in which he received a tattoo based on the cover art from the first issue of Crawl To Me.

In "Wolf and Cub", the February 9, 2012, episode of the CBS show Person of Interest, several IDW Publishing books and posters are featured on the set, including Alan's Crawl to Me, Wire Hangers and Killogy. A Crawl to Me poster painted by artist Menton3 was featured in a pivotal scene inside a comic book shop near the end of the episode. The graphic novel will be adapted in a full-length film produced by Robert and screenplay will re-written by David White and T.J. Cimfel.

On May 10, 2012, Robert announced he was teaming with IDW Publishing again for his next comic series, Killogy, a four-issue series depicting the stories of three murderers who share a prison cell who are depicted with the likenesses of Frank Vincent, Marky Ramone and Brea Grant. The first issue was released in October 2012.

Upon its Halloween 2012 release, Killogy became a hit series and received rave reviews from respected horror and comic book critics. Fangoria hailed it, saying, "Killogy is an INSTANT CLASSIC... it finds its way into your head and stays there!" while Giant Fire Breathing Robot praised "With Killogy, Alan Robert has not only earned his place amongst the big names in comics, but he can stand shoulder to shoulder with some of the best horror creators in any form.

Killogy won a Horror Comics Award from ComicMonsters.com for "Best Scene of 2013" and was nominated for Best Mini-Series by The Ghastly Awards, a prestigious honor as nominees are chosen by horror comic book professionals. Additionally, Bloody Disgusting named Killogy in its Top 5 Best Mini-Series of 2013.

In July 2013, Robert teamed up with IDW again to produce his next comic series, The Shunned One, which focuses on an Angel of Death who goes rogue after being ordered to take several innocent lives. The release date for the comic series is listed as early 2015.

In May 2014, Robert announced he was teaming up with ex-Misfits guitarist, Doyle Wolfgang von Frankenstein, for a special Halloween 2014 Killogy issue which centers on a character based on Doyle. Robert said that this was a continuation of the original Killogy series but that he did not expect any of the characters from the previous IDW published series to appear in this issue. At the same time, Robert teamed with award-winning writer and producer Rodney Barnes to develop an animated television series based on the Killogy comic series.

=== Animated series ===
Alan Robert's hit Killogy comic series (IDW Publishing) is currently being adapted into an animated television series by Robert's production company Wasted Talent Entertainment in association with Canadian-based Squeeze Studio Animation. Award-winning Executive Producer Rodney Barnes of The Boondocks fame is attached as Show-runner. A six-minute animated teaser featuring the likenesses and voices of celebrities Frank Vincent Marky Ramone, Brea Grant, and Doyle Wolfgang Von Frankenstein, who all appeared as characters in the original comic series, launched on Rolling Stone magazine's website.

=== Movies ===
On July 19, 2013, it was announced that Robert had signed a movie deal with the Spanish film production company, Rodar Y Rodar, to produce a full-length feature film based on the Crawl To Me comic book series. It was also announced that Robert would be co-producing the movie along with Jeff Mazzola and Chris White. The director of the film will be Victor Garcia. While no release date was provided, it was said that studio work will be filmed in Spain and exteriors in Canada.

On July 9, 2014, Alan announced that his upcoming Shunned One comic was being adapted for a movie. The film adaption is being scripted by writer Jack Reher, and being co-produced by Robert's Wasted Talent Entertainment firm along with The Coalition Group. At the time of the announcement, no scheduled release date for the movie had been listed.

In July 2025 an official concept trailer was released for a film adaptation of his comic Crawl to Me.Robert stated "It feels poetic to finally have Crawl to Me back in my hands," says Robert. "This is the adaptation fans have been waiting for — true to the book, and made with a team that understands its psychological complexity and raw terror."

=== Coloring books ===
In May 2016, Robert continued his relationship with IDW Publishing when they jointly announced that IDW would be releasing Robert's The Beauty Of Horror: A GOREgeous Coloring Book on October 11, 2016. In an interview with Metal Insider, Robert got the inspiration for a horror/gore-themed coloring book while watching family members enjoying the recent resurgence of coloring books.

On May 11, 2017, Nerdist Industries announced, via their Twitter feed and website, the release of a promotional video for the second book in the series, The Beauty of Horror 2: Ghouliana's Creepatorium – Another GOREgeous Coloring Book. The book is released in the Fall of 2017 continued the theme of the well-received first book, It quickly became a best seller. In July 2018 his third book in the series The Beauty of Horror 3 was released. Since 2019 Robert has gone on to release The Beauty of Horror volume 4, 5, and 6. The 7th and most recent installment The Beauty of Horror 7: Backwards Records was released in early 2025, this book featured 80 pages of horror-infused parodies of iconic album covers. That same year Robert also released a story book/coloring titled The Beauty of Horror: Ghouliana's Sanctuary for Monsters--A GOREgeous Storybook, which gave background on some of the characters from the series.

Robert has also released special holiday themed coloring books for Christmas and Halloween.

In 2022 Robert partnered with the company NECA to release an action figure of his coloring books main character Ghouliana, it debuted at San Diego Conic Con in 2022 and was officially released in 2025.

In September 2024 Robert released a coloring book based on the movie Beetlejuice. Robert also partnered with Universal to make a book from their Classic Monsters films.

In 2025 Robert announced that he would be releasing a special coloring book based on The Conjuring Universe. It was released on March 24, 2026.

== Personal life ==
Robert is Jewish. He got his bar mitzvah at the Temple Emanu-El Hebrew School in Brooklyn, where the father of Evan Seinfeld (Biohazard) was the principal.

Robert is married to his wife, they have one daughter together. He stated that he started his coloring book series after coming home from a tour in 2016 and joining the two to color, stating "I wanted to color, but I really just couldn't find anything that I would want to invest the time in, and my wife said, 'You should just draw your own,'" "That sparked the idea of making something that would appeal to me, and of course it had to be the most disgusting thing that I could think of." Robert also has a love for horror films which have greatly influenced his drawing style.

== Discography ==
=== Life of Agony ===
==== Albums ====
- River Runs Red (1993)
- Ugly (1995)
- Soul Searching Sun (1997)
- 1989-1999 (1999)
- Unplugged at the Lowlands Festival '97 (2000)
- The Best of Life of Agony (2003)
- River Runs Again: Live (CD/DVD) (2003) (Live)
- Broken Valley (2005)
- A Place Where There's No More Pain (2017)
- The Sound of Scars (2019)

=== Spoiler NYC ===
- Grease Fire in Hell's (2007)

=== Type O Negative ===
- Bloody Kisses (1993)
