= Soul Searching Sun =

Studio album by Life of Agony
- Released: September 9, 1997
- Recorded: Studio 4 Recordings, Conshohocken, PA
- Genres: Alternative rock; grunge
- Length: 53:08
- Label: Roadrunner
- Producers: Phil Nicolo and Life of Agony

Life of Agony chronology
Ugly (1995)	Soul Searching Sun (1997)	Broken Valley (2005)

Singles from Soul Searching Sun
- 1. "Weeds" Released: 1997; 2. "Desire" Released: 1997; 3. "Tangerine" Released: 1998; 4. "My Mind is Dangerous" Released: 1998

Professional ratings
Review scores
Source	Rating
AllMusic	link
Collector's Guide to Heavy Metal	5/10

Soul Searching Sun is the third album released by Life of Agony in 1997 through Roadrunner Records. The album was co-produced and co-mixed by Life of Agony and Phil Nicolo of the Butcher Brothers at Studio 4 Recording in Conshohocken, Pennsylvania. This was the band's only recording with new drummer Dan Richardson and featured what was another stylistic change for the band, incorporating psychedelic elements into their sound and featured their first true ballad in "My Mind Is Dangerous".

== Overview ==
Upon release in North America, the album was issued with three hidden tracks: "River Runs Red" (Re-Zamped) which was a re-recording of one of the band's most enduring songs from their debut album of the same name, "Let's Pretend (Trippin')" which was a psychedelic styled remake of a song off of their second album Ugly, and "Weeds (Unplugged)" which was an alternate, acoustic version of the album's first single. These bonus tracks were not listed on the packaging or in the album's liner notes. Shortly after the initial release of the album, Roadrunner Records released a digipak reissue of the album in Europe, which included the first two bonus tracks from the North American limited edition along with "Tangerine (Re-Zep)", a Led Zeppelin cover song, which featured, fellow NYC band, Anthrax's Charile Benante on 6-string acoustic guitar and 12-string acoustic guitar. All four of these bonus tracks were recorded separately from the proper album, in June 1997 at Andy Kravitz's "The Amazing Barn" in Conshohocken, with Kravitz co-producing and co-mixing. A fifth track, another re-recording entitled "How It Would Be '97", was also recorded at these sessions and was released as a b-side on the "Weeds" slimline CD single.

Shortly after the album's release, lead singer Keith Caputo would leave the band to launch a solo career, citing his heart no longer being into the music. Life Of Agony recruited former Ugly Kid Joe singer Whitfield Crane to step in to fulfill touring obligations in support of Soul Searching Sun. However the band disbanded shortly thereafter. Life Of Agony's original lineup would reunite for the first time in 2003 to perform two sold out shows at NYC's Irving Plaza. Several tracks from "Soul Searching Sun" including "My Mind Is Dangerous" were performed at these shows.

== Singles ==
The single "Weeds" became the band’s first radio hit reaching number 27 on the US Mainstream Rock chart and number 19 on the US Active Rock chart. Internationally it reached peaked at number 91 on the UK Singles Chart. The third single "Tangerine" also got radio play as it peaked at number 37 on the US Mainstream Rock chart and 37 on US Active Rock. Music videos were made for both "Weeds" and "Desire".

== Track listing ==
No.	Title	Writer(s)	Length
1.	"Hope"	Alan Robert	4:03
2.	"Weeds"	Robert	4:07
3.	"Gently Sentimental"	Robert, Keith Caputo	3:20
4.	"Tangerine"	Robert, Caputo	4:09
5.	"My Mind Is Dangerous"	Caputo	4:05
6.	"Neg"	Caputo	3:47
7.	"Lead You Astray"	Robert	3:59
8.	"Heroin Dreams"	Caputo	5:45
9.	"None"	Robert, Caputo	3:44
10.	"Angry Tree"	Caputo	3:57
11.	"Hemophiliac in Me"	Caputo	3:37
12.	"Desire"	Robert	3:12
13.	"Whispers"	Robert	5:15
Total length:			53:08

European Digipak Edition Bonus Tracks
No.	Title	Lyrics	Music	Length
14.	"River Runs Red (Re-Zamped)"	Robert		3:28
15.	"Let's Pretend (Trippin')"	Caputo		4:39
16.	"Tangerine (Re-Zep)"	Jimmy Page	Jimmy Page	3:28
Total length:				1:04:43

American Limited Edition Hidden (unlisted) Bonus Tracks
No.	Title	Lyrics	Length
14.	"River Runs Red (Re-Zamped)"	Robert	3:16
15.	"Let's Pretend (Trippin')"	Caputo	4:42
16.	"Weeds" (Unplugged)	Robert	4:36
Total length:			1:05:42

== Personnel ==
Life of Agony

- Keith Caputo – lead vocals
- Dan Richardson – drums
- Alan Robert – bass
- Joey Z. – guitar

Additional musicians

- Charlie Benante – 6 and 12 string acoustic guitar
- Philip Nowlan – piano (on "My Mind is Dangerous")

Technical personnel

- Phil Nicolo – recording
- Phil Nicolo and Life Of Agony – production and mixing
- Andy Kravitz – additional production
- Dirk Grobelny, Ian Cross, Philip Nowlan, Andy Kravitz – engineers
- Mike "Bones" Malak, Brian Lloyd – assistant engineers
- Brian James, Chris Gately, Jeremy Birnbaum – technical support
- George Marino – mastering
- Dave McKean – art illustrations and design
- Kristen Callahan – band Photography

== Charts ==
Charts (1995)	Peak position
Belgium Flanders (Ultratop)	34
Germany (GfK Entertainment)	12
Finnish Albums (Suomen virallinen lista)	24
Netherlands (Dutch Top 100)	16
Swedish Albums (Sverigetopplistan)	45
UK (Official Charts)	111
US Billboard 200	157
US Heatseekers	9
