= The Sound of Scars =

Studio album by Life of Agony
- Released: October 11, 2019
- Genres: Alternative metal; grunge; groove metal; hardcore punk
- Length: 40:44
- Label: Napalm
- Producers: Sylvia Massy; Joey Z

Life of Agony chronology
A Place Where There's No More Pain (2017)	The Sound of Scars (2019)

Record Store Day Special Edition Artwork
- RSD Black Friday 2019 ▪︎ Special Edition ▪︎ Red/Black Splatter Vinyl (limited to 500 pieces)

Singles from The Sound of Scars
- 1. "Scars" Released: August 9, 2019; 2. "Lay Down" Released: September 6, 2019; 3. "Black Heart" Released: October 4, 2019

The Sound of Scars is the sixth studio album by American alternative metal band Life of Agony. It was released on October 11, 2019, through Napalm Records and is the band's first release with drummer Veronica Bellino.

The Sound of Scars is a concept album dealing with issues related to trauma recovery and healing. It is a sequel to the story told on the band's debut album, River Runs Red.

== Concept ==
in a 2023 interview the bands bassist and lyricist Alan Robert stated

"The Sound of Scars” came about very organically. The concept for tying the album to “River Runs Red” was something that evolved over time after a few songs were written. The lyrics seemed to have this common message about overcoming hardships, survival and redemption, so I brought the idea up to the band about continuing the Rivers story. What if the teenager on RRR survived his suicide attempt? What would his life be like 26 years later. We’ve met so many survivors through touring around the world all these years, and we’re survivors ourselves, that theme really resonated with all of us. We began to explore that idea even deeper and decided to create the audio scenes that continue the RRR narrative ... another concept album was born."

The album starts off with the theatrical track, "Prelude", the track begins with the same sound of blood dripping into water that closed River Runs Red. In "Prelude", the listener learns that the young man from River Runs Red has survived his suicide attempt. The story then jumps 26 years forward, (which is almost the same amount of time between this album and its predecessor River Runs Red) with the man now married and attempting to cope with the "scars" of his past.

== Release and promotion ==
On August 9, 2019, the hit single "Scars" premiered on Billboard the song went to the number 1 spot on Music Choice with 2.44 million listeners. That same day the band announced their new album "Sound of Scars."

The second single "Lay Down" was released on September 6, 2019, alongside an official music video. The third and final single "Black Heart" was released on October 4, 2019, once again being occupied with an official music video.

The group then went on tour in support of the album which lasted till December and included dates in North America and Europe.

On November 29, 2019, a special, red/black splatter vinyl edition of The Sound of Scars was released. This Record Store Day "Black Friday" release was hand numbered and limited to 500 pieces worldwide. This edition featured alternate cover art and an exclusive lyric sheet, both designed by bassist Alan Robert.

== Documentary ==
A documentary film, also titled The Sound of Scars, was released April 16, 2021. The film was directed by Leigh Brooks and includes interviews with the band members and their families. The film also includes archival footage, photographs, lost interviews, and goes over various points of the band's history, particularly Mina Caputo's gender transition.

Kerrang! gave the documentary a 5/5 stating "Credit must be given to The Sound Of Scars director Leigh Brooks for aspiring to tell a different story. This is a film not about the making of Life Of Agony’s incredible music, but rather the making of the people that made phenomenal songs like River Runs Red, How It Would Be and Weeds. What would be a major focus of other films – the band imploding just as they seemed destined for a major breakthrough; reunions and re-reunions – are all present and correct, and hit hard, too. But across its 90 minutes, TSOS is altogether more preoccupied with the inner lives of its subjects."

== Reception ==
Professional ratings
Review scores
Source	Rating
Blabbermouth.net	8/10
Consequence of Sound	Positive
New Noise Magazine	4/5
Metal Temple	9/10
Metal.de	8/10

The Sound of Scars has received positive critical reviews since its release. Being viewed as a worthy sequel to the band's debut River Runs Red.

Dom Lawson of Blabbermouth.net praised Caputo's vocals, saying "Caputo sings every last word as if teetering on the edge of desperation, a remorseless blaze of passion and charisma that carries these songs far beyond their initial potential." Lawson also praised the band's musicianship and said the album "is a welcome display of class and power from some perennially unsung champions." Jon Hadusek of Consequence of Sound praised the album's story line, Caputo's vocals, and mixing of genres, but said the more straightforward hardcore parts were the album's weakest moments. Hadusek said the album is a worthy successor to River Runs Red.

It was named Album of the Year by The Aquarian. They described it as "A concept album in every sense possible, The Sound of it as finds Life of Agony once again digging deep into the emotional, physical, and spiritual burden of life’s endless journey—emerging hard and heavy from the lineage of yesterday like a catapult into tomorrow with each emotionally hammering track. In other words, The Sound of Scars offers fresh perspective of the human condition without any trappings of a nostalgia trip."

The album was also named #1 Album on Metal Hammer’s (DE) ‘Best of 2019’: Alternative-Rock/Punk List.

== Track listing ==
All tracks are written by Life of Agony.

No.	Title	Length
1.	"Prelude"	0:32
2.	"Scars"	2:46
3.	"Black Heart"	3:33
4.	"Lay Down"	3:49
5.	"Then"	1:17
6.	"Empty Hole"	3:03
7.	"My Way Out"	3:56
8.	"Eliminate"	2:17
9.	"Now"	1:31
10.	"Once Below"	3:31
11.	"Stone"	3:21
12.	"Weight of the World"	3:34
13.	"When"	1:43
14.	"I Surrender"	5:56
Total length:		40:44

== Personnel ==
Life of Agony

- Mina Caputo – lead vocals
- Joey Z – guitar, backing vocals, engineer, producer
- Alan Robert – bass, backing vocals, creative director
- Veronica Bellino – drums

Additional musicians

- Morgan O. Shaughnessey – strings

Production

- Sylvia Massy – mixing, producer
- Howie Weinberg – mastering
- Gino Depinto – photography

Voices

- Toni Caputo
- Nelson Faro Decastro
- Giana Goldstein
- Brian Hyland
- Elias Mansourati
- Kyle Nichols
- Dori Ann Scagnelli
- Frank Sileo
- Christine Zagami
- Mia Zampella
- Sofia Zampella

== Charts ==
Chart (2019)	Peak position
Austria (Ö3 Top 40)	69
Belgium Flanders (Ultratop)	84
Germany (GfK Entertainment)	34
Switzerland (Hitparade)	82
US Independent (Billboard)	35
