= A Place Where There's No More Pain =

Studio album by Life of Agony
- Released: April 28, 2017
- Studios: The Nest, Long Island, NY; Zoot 2 Studios, Orange County, NY
- Genres: Alternative metal, grunge
- Length: 40:32
- Label: Napalm
- Producers: Matt Brown; Life of Agony

Life of Agony chronology
Broken Valley (2005)	A Place Where There's No More Pain (2017)	The Sound of Scars (2019)

Professional ratings
Review scores
Source	Rating
Blabbermouth.net	9/10
Metal Hammer	3/5 stars

A Place Where There's No More Pain is the fifth studio album by American alternative metal band Life of Agony. The album, the band's first studio release since 2005's Broken Valley, was released on April 28, 2017 through Napalm Records.

This is the band's last release with drummer Sal Abruscato, who would depart from the band for a second time later that year in December. It is also the band’s first album since singer Keith Caputo publicly came out as transgender (then identifying as "Mina").

== Track listing ==
All tracks are written by Life of Agony.

No.	Title	Length
1.	"Meet My Maker"	3:50
2.	"Right This Wrong"	5:01
3.	"A Place Where There's No More Pain"	2:45
4.	"Dead Speak Kindly"	4:51
5.	"A New Low"	3:58
6.	"World Gone Mad"	3:07
7.	"Bag of Bones"	5:06
8.	"Walking Catastrophe"	3:30
9.	"Song for the Abused"	4:45
10.	"Little Spots of You"	3:37
Total length:		40:32

== Charts ==
Chart (2017)	Peak position
Austria (Ö3 Top 40	33
Belgium Flanders (Ultratop)	28
Belgium Wallonia (Ultratop)	104
Germany (GfK Entertainment)	23
Netherlands (Dutch Top 100)	112
Switzerland (Hitparade)	56
UK Independent (Official Charts)	35
UK Rock and Metal (Official Charts)	15
US Top Album Sales	73
US Hard Rock Albums	24
US Heatseekers Albums	3
US Independent Albums	7

== Personnel ==
Life of Agony

- Mina Caputo – vocals
- Joey Z. – guitar
- Alan Robert – bass, art direction
- Sal Abruscato – drums

Production

- Produced and mixed by Matt Brown and Life of Agony
- Mastered by Ted Jensen
