= The Metal Hall of Fame =

Honorary award for musicians

Metal Hall of Fame
- Former name: Metal Hall of History (2017–2019)
- Established: 2017
- Type: Honorary
- Director: Pat Gesualdo
- Website: metalhalloffame.org

The Metal Hall of Fame was established in 2017 to honor and preserve the legacy of iconic musicians and industry figures who have shaped hard rock and heavy metal music. It also serves as a non-profit organization with proceeds from the event supporting free music programs for children with special needs.

Since its inception in 2017 the honorary induction gala has been held during January in Anaheim, California. As of 2026 there have been 73 individuals inducted and 21 bands.

== Background ==
The event was founded by Pat Gesualdo (who is a studio/touring drummer) in 2017 and was originally named the Metal Hall of History before it was renamed to the Metal Hall of Fame in 2019. Gesualdo claimed he started the event out of love for Hard Rock and Heavy Metal music. The committee consists of music executives, artists, and innovators. In 2025 Wendy Dio and David Ellefson joined the committee.

In a 2024 interview Gesualdo commented on the selection process, stating, "The process of being Inducted into the Metal Hall of Fame starts directly with the fans. It's all about them. Fans from all over the world vote on their favorite artists at the Metal Hall of Fame website, who can vote all year long. The votes are then compiled by the Metal Hall of Fame Nominating Committee, and nominees are then voted on by the board, and then inducted."

In 2023, the Hall of Fame began the "Metal Across America" Tour, featuring pop up exhibits featuring memorabilia from bands like Iron Maiden and Kiss.

It is not a Hall of Fame in the traditional sense as there is no building dedicated to the honoraries, it serves more as a mixture of Hall of Fame and an award show. However, in 2024 Gesualdo claimed that the committee were working on making the Hall of Fame a physical location.

== 2010s inductees ==
=== 2017 ===
The inaugural Metal Hall of Fame induction ceremony took place on January 18, 2017, in Anaheim, California, and was hosted by Television/Radio personality Eddie Trunk.

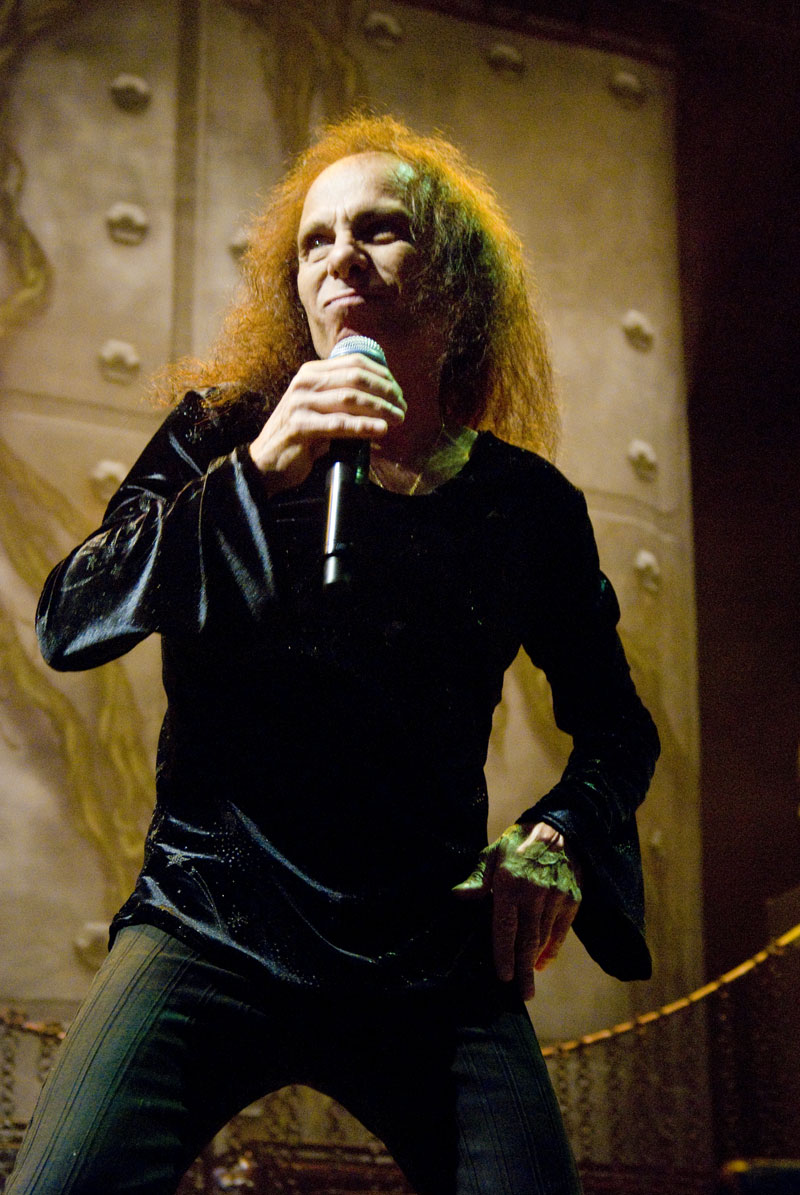
Inaugural inductee Ronnie James Dio

Individual inductees

- Ronnie James Dio (With Wendy Dio accepting the Induction)
- Lemmy Kilmister (With Motorhead Manager Todd Singerman accepting the Induction)
- Rudy Sarzo
- Vinny Appice
- Frankie Banali
- Don Airey
- Ross “The Boss” Friedman
- Randy Rhoads (With Kathy and Kelle Rhoads accepting the Induction)
- Andy Zildjian

Band inductees

- Scorpions (With Mikkey Dee accepting the Induction)

Special inductees

- Rainbow Bar and Grill (venue)
- Metal Blade Records
- Rudy Sarzo and Frankie Banali (Together for a special 33rd Anniversary Induction of Quiet Riot, as the first band to achieve the #1 Heavy Metal Album status)

=== 2018 ===
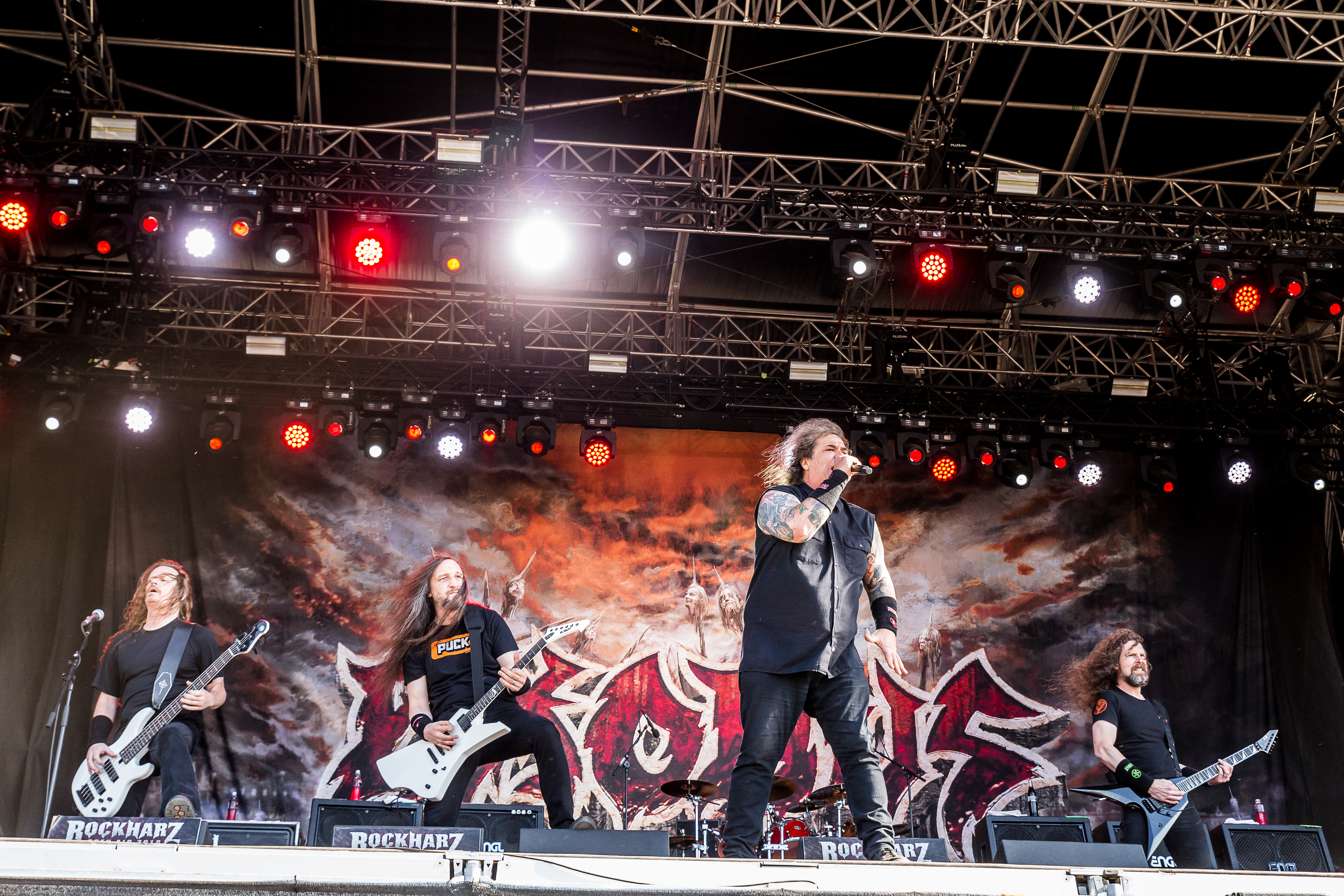
2018 inductees Exodus

Individual inductees

- Metal Mike
- Carmine Appice
- Billy Sheehan
- Nick Menza
- Jordan Rudess
- Sammy Ash
- Lzzy Hale
- Bill Ward
- Munsey Ricci
- Elliott Rubinson

Band inductees

- Anvil
- Exodus
- Riot V

=== 2019 ===
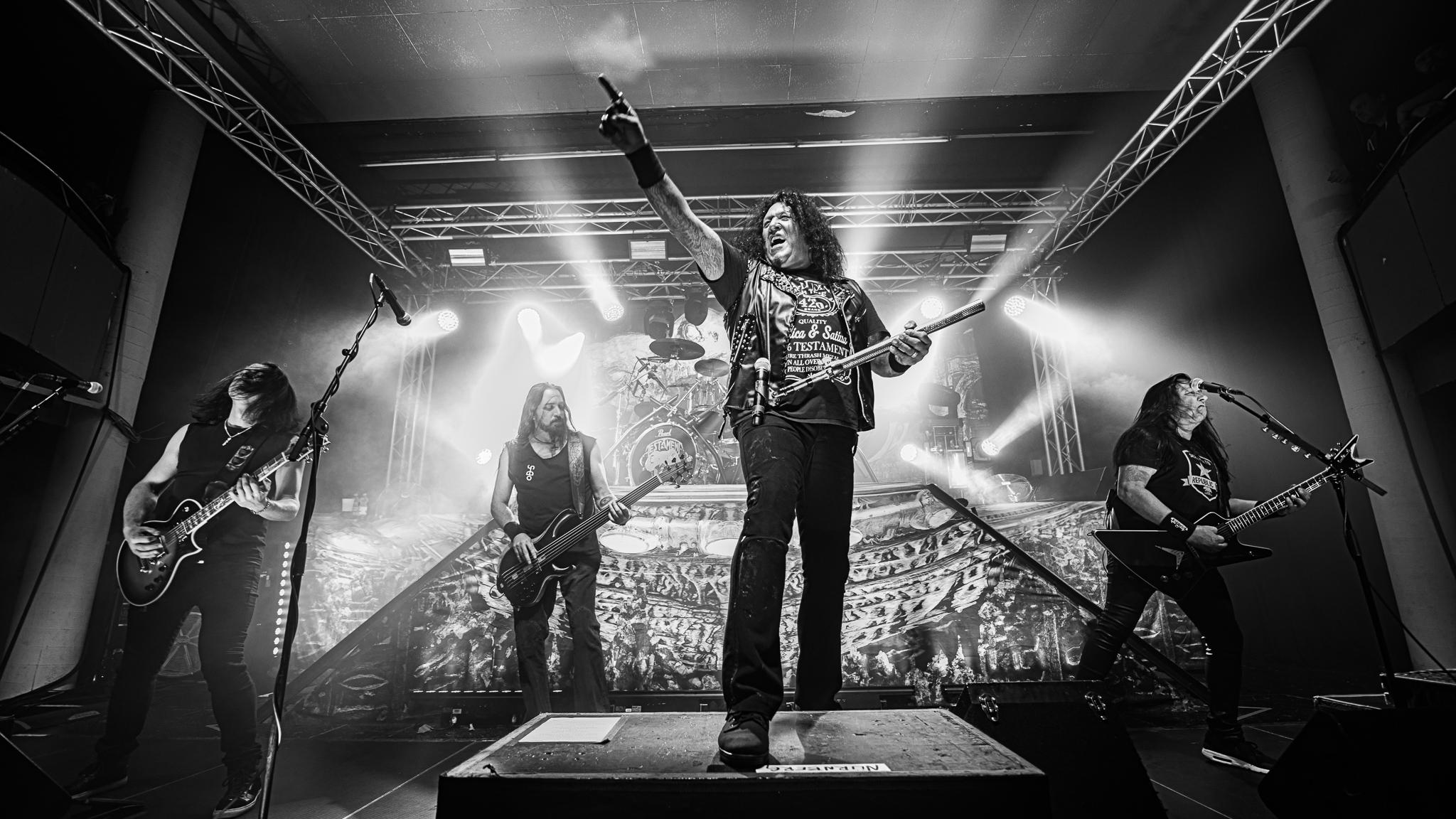
2019 inductees Testament

The 2019 Gala took place on Wednesday, January 23, 2019, at the Marriott Delta Garden Grove, in Anaheim, and was once again hosted by Eddie Trunk.

Individual inductees

- Doro
- Jeff Pilson
- Jeff Scott Soto
- Lee Kerslake
- Mike Portnoy
- Max Norman
- Bob Daisley
- David Ellefson
- Lita Ford
- Jon and Marsha Zazula (inducted together)

Band inductees

- Anthrax
- Testament
- Uriah Heep

== 2020s inductees ==
=== 2020 ===
The 4th annual Metal Hall of Fame ceremony and gala took place on January 15, 2020, in Anaheim, California. Steve Vai inducted the event.

Individual inductees

- Graham Bonnet
- Don Dokken
- Jack Orbin
- Chris Poland
- Stephen Pearcy
- Geoff Tate
- Steve Vai
- Joe Satriani

Band inductees

- Metal Church
- Prong

=== 2021 ===
The 5th annual ceremony was held virtually due to the COVID-19 pandemic.

Individual inductees

- Bill Aucoin
- Blaze Bayley
- Eric Carr
- Paul Di’Anno
- Marty Friedman
- Bruce Kulick
- Doc McGhee
- Derek Riggs
- Mark Weiss

Band inductees

- Stryper
- Triumph

=== 2022 ===
Individual inductees

- Randy Burns
- Tony Harnell
- Toby Wright

Band inductees

- Onslaught
- Voivod

=== 2023 ===
The 7th Annual Metal Hall of Fame gala took place on January 26, 2023, at the Canyon Club in Agoura Hills, Calif. Eddie Trunk co-hosted the ceremony with alongside Cathy Rankin.

Individual inductees

- Doug Aldrich
- Lou Gramm
- Chris Impellitteri

Band inductees

- Armored Saint
- Helloween
- Raven
- Twisted Sister

=== 2024 ===
The 8th annual Metal Hall of Fame ceremony took place on January 24, 2024, at Garden Grove, Anaheim, CA. Guest performers included Joel Hoekstra, Whitesnake and Night Ranger.

Individual inductees

- Sebastian Bach
- Carlos Cavazo
- Mick Mars
- Mikeal Maglieri
- Tom Morello
- Tim “Ripper” Owens
- Penelope Spheeris
- Eddie Trunk

Band inductees

- Biohazard

Special inductees

- Cleopatra Records

=== 2025 ===
The 9th annual Metal Hall of Fame gala took place on January 22, 2025, at the Grand Theater in Anaheim, California, it featured performances from Kill Devil Hill and Jeff Young who was also an inductee, it was once again hosted by Eddie Trunk.

Individual inductees

- Burton C. Bell
- Dimebag Darrell
- Doyle Wolfgang von Frankenstein
- Alissa White-Gluz
- Rikki Rockett
- Jeff Young

Band inductees

- Cannibal Corpse
- Dangerous Toys
- Life of Agony

=== 2026 ===
The 2026 edition dubbed The Metal Hall of Fame’s Sunset Strip Blowout Bash took place at the Sunset Strip in California on January 21, 2026, and was hosted by Eddie Trunk and co host Cathy Rankin.

Individual Inductees

- Gilby Clarke
- Rikki Rockett
- Tracii Guns
- Chris Holmes
- Warren DeMartini
