= River Runs Red =

- Original Release (1993)

Studio album by Life of Agony
- Released: October 12, 1993
- Recorded: May 1993
- Studios: System Two Studios (Brooklyn, New York)
- Genres: Alternative metal; hardcore punk; grunge
- Length: 50:32
- Label: Roadrunner
- Producer: Josh Silver

Life of Agony chronology
The Stain Remains (1991)	River Runs Red (1993)	Ugly (1995)

Singles from River Runs Red
- 1. "Through and Through" Released: 1994; 2. "This Time" Released: 1994

Alternate Cover Art
- Limited Edition Digipak Reissue (1994)

River Runs Red is the debut studio album by American alternative metal band Life of Agony, released on October 12, 1993, by Roadrunner Records. It is a concept album, telling the story of a teenager, from a troubled household, who ultimately attempts suicide. The album features what Rolling Stone called "bleak odes to misanthropy, parental neglect, regret and killing yourself".

All music and arrangements are credited to Life of Agony collectively. All lyrics, melodies and musical concepts are credited to bassist Alan Robert. Robert also conceptualized the album's cover art and designed the band's logo. The album was produced and mixed by Josh Silver (ex-producer/keyboardist of Type O Negative) at Systems Two in Brooklyn, New York, and was mastered by George Marino at Sterling Sound, New York. River Runs Red was dedicated to Carl DeStefano.

In May 2005, River Runs Red became the fourth album overall to be inducted into the Decibel Hall of Fame. In June 2017, Rolling Stone named River Runs Red number 58 on its list of the "100 Greatest Metal Albums of All Time". In 2023 the band went on a worldwide tour in celebration of the albums 30th anniversary playing it in its entirety.

== Sound and style ==
Rolling Stone noted that the tracks are "sung passionately in a unique baritone" and that they are set to "a pastiche of gloom metal and hardcore punk". The magazine also said that the band used "interpolated, hip-hop-style theatrical skits" to tell the story of a man driven to suicide. Jason Anderson of AllMusic described the album as a "unique combination of New York hardcore, metal, and a touch of spooky grunge vaguely reminiscent of Alice in Chains. Anderson said "This Time" and "Underground" were the album's grungiest tracks, while "Method of Groove" was "reckless hardcore".

== Concept ==
River Runs Red is a concept album that focuses on suicide, while also exploring themes of abuse, alcoholism, and abandonment.

=== Story ===
The lyrics of the musical tracks on "River Runs Red" do not directly correlate with the story but do touch on personal issues facing various band members and at the same time they provide a feel in-line with the story being told in the theatrical tracks. For example, the album's first theatrical track, "Monday", establishes that the main character's mother (possibly step-mother) is verbally abusive and neglects her infant child. The track ends with the main character listening to a voicemail in which his girlfriend breaks up with him. The next musical song is the title track, "River Runs Red" which include lyrics about contemplating suicide, "I got the razor at my wrist". On "Thursday" the main character enters his home and is once again berated by his mother. The track ends with him being fired from his job and being notified that he is failing two classes and won't be able to graduate high school. Two tracks later, the song "My Eyes", includes lyrics about giving up on life completely, "Just give me one good reason to live, I'll give you three to die". The album closes with the track "Friday". The main character comes home and endures the worst insults yet from his mother. She then instigates a fight with the father, who engages her in a screaming match. As the teen heads upstairs, the parents continue to argue and the sound of plates shattering is heard in the distance. The main character locks himself in the bathroom and breaks the fourth wall by turning on a radio that begins playing River Runs Red. The mother yells at the teenager through the door as he begins running bath water. The young man's breath becomes shaky as he slits his wrist. The sound of blood can be heard dripping into the water. The mother breaks into the bathroom and screams in horror at what she sees. The album ends with the mother's screams fading as the sound of his blood dripping into water increases.

The personal nature of the lyrics resonated with fans, often serving as a source of inspiration. As bassist Alan Robert—who penned the album's lyrics—explained in 2023:

"All of the songs were written from such an emotional and personal place, there was really no preconceived idea on how others would perceive it, let alone how it would affect them in such a profound way. Without even realizing it, there was this subconscious underlying message of hope that was infused into the songs that made listeners feel like they were not alone."

== Releases and reissues ==
=== River Runs Red – Digipak Edition ===
In June 1994, Roadrunner Records re-issued River Runs Red as a limited edition, 3-fold digipak featuring alternate artwork and bonus tracks to coincide with the band's UK tour that month. In addition to the standard album tracks, this release included four bonus live tracks recorded at The Stone Pony in Asbury Park, New Jersey, on February 25, 1994. Three of these tracks are live renditions of songs featured on River Runs Red. However, the studio version of "Plexi Intro" is not found on the album. The original version, entitled "Plexiglass Gate", was recorded during pre-production of River Runs Red in August 1992. The track was later released on the 1993 compilation album, East Coast Assault released by Too Damn Hype Records. The song received significant airplay on popular, NYC area, college radio station, WSOU, which helped introduce the band to a larger audience just prior to the release of River Runs Red.

=== River Runs Red – The Top Shelf Edition ===
On April 29, 2008, Roadrunner Records issued a limited, two-disc CD/DVD titled River Runs Red – The Top Shelf Edition. This quad-fold, slipcase digipak featured a CD containing the original album remastered for the first time since its initial release over 15 years earlier. Ted Jensen remastered the album at Sterling Sound, New York City in June 2006. The remastered CD also included four previously released bonus tracks. The first two bonus tracks, "Here I Am, Here I Stay" and "Depression", were recorded in May 1991 and originally appeared on Life of Agony's fourth demo, The Stain Remains. The remaining two bonus tracks, "3 Companions" and the aforementioned, "Plexiglass Gate", were not demo tracks, instead they were written and recorded during the River Runs Red pre-production/writing sessions in August 1992. The bonus tracks were remixed in September 1999 by Alan Robert and Michael Marciano at Systems Two recording studios in Brooklyn, New York. Additionally, the set included a DVD featuring the music videos for "Through and Through" and "This Time", as well as two live performances from the Dynamo Open Air Festival in 1995. The extended liner notes included an exclusive interview with the band and producer/mixer, Josh Silver, on the making of the album. River Runs Red – The Top Shelf Edition remains the only CD release to feature the original album in remastered form.

=== 20 Years Strong – River Runs Red: Live in Brussels ===
On October 7, 2009, it was announced that the band would perform the album in its entirety, for the first time ever, at the Starland Ballroom in Sayreville, New Jersey, on November 28, 2009. This would become the first date of a US tour, followed by a European tour on which the band would perform the complete album, top to bottom, at every show. The performance at the Ancienne Belgique in Brussels, Belgium on April 3, 2010, was filmed and recorded for a CD/DVD package entitled "20 Years Strong – River Runs Red: Live in Brussels", which was published later that same year.

=== 2013 Colored Vinyl ===
On November 29, 2013, Brookvale Records reissued River Runs Red on vinyl in three limited edition colors. 1,500 hand numbered copies were pressed in "solid red" colored vinyl and issued as a Record Store Day Black Friday release—to be sold exclusively in independently owned record stores across the United States, 500 hand numbered copies were pressed in "solid blue" colored vinyl—sold exclusively in European stores and another 500 were pressed in "red/black blood swirl" colored vinyl—sold exclusively at Looney Tunes CDs in Long Island, New York.

== Sequel: The Sound of Scars ==
October 11, 2019, almost exactly 26 years after the release of River Runs Red, Life of Agony released the sequel, The Sound of Scars, on Napalm Records. It was Life of Agony's second concept album and the only sequel to the story told on River Runs Red.

The album starts off with the theatrical track, "Prelude", the track begins with the same sound of blood dripping into water that closed River Runs Red. In "Prelude", the listener learns that the young man from River Runs Red has survived his suicide attempt. The story then jumps 26 years forward, with the man now married and attempting to cope with the "scars" of his past.

Since its release, The Sound Of Scars has received a positive critical response. Dom Lawson of Blabbermouth.net said the sequel was "a welcome display of class and power from some perennially unsung champions." Jon Hadusek of Consequence of Sound praised the storyline and called the album, "a worthy successor to River Runs Red."

== Reception ==
Professional ratings
Review scores
Source	Rating
AllMusic	4/5 stars
Collector's Guide to Heavy Metal	8/10
Kerrang!	(1993) (2011)

In 2007 Hit Parader named River Runs Red the 6th greatest hardcore album of all time, whilst The Village Voice ranked the album at number 6 on its 2013 list of the "Top 20 New York Hardcore and Metal Albums of All Time". In 2017, Rolling Stone named River Runs Red the 58th-greatest metal album of all time. In May 2005, River Runs Red was inducted into the Decibel Magazine Hall of Fame, being the fourth album overall to be featured there. In 2023 Rolling Stone named the lead song from the album “This Time” the 88th-greatest heavy metal song of all time.

In 2025 American Songwriter put River Runs Red on their list of 5 albums that bridged the gap between alternative rock and metal. Stating "This 1993 record blends together metal and alt-rock beautifully, with a touch of punk rock in the mix as well. It’s an incredible debut from Life Of Agony, and the themes behind this album are about as dark as you’d expect. However, there’s something relatable in Life Of Agony’s songs about isolation, sadness, and death. It’s surprisingly catchy for such a bleak piece of work."

Jason Anderson of AllMusic gave River Runs Red a highly positive review, saying the album was "passionate, serious, and heavy" and that it was "one of the early '90s' better metal debuts." However, Anderson said Caputo's vocals were underdeveloped, but also said the delivery was unique and passionate. Ghost Cult Magazine wrote "The album shook the Hardcore and Metal world to its core with its heavy, catchy riff-heavy songs, impassioned vocals, and frank lyrics about suicide, drug addiction, ptsd, and family trauma." MetalSucks added "River Runs Red had groove, it had swagger, it had sadness and aggression. The record was written with so much complexity in terms of emotion but had some many hooks and riffs that the band was able to convey the concept without making the overall record or the music too complicated."

In 2013, the vinyl edition of the album peaked at number 11 on the Billboard Vinyl Albums chart.

== Track listing ==
All lyrics are written by Alan Robert; all music is composed by Life Of Agony.

No.	Title	Length
1.	"This Time"	6:00
2.	"Underground"	4:44
3.	"Monday"	1:31
4.	"River Runs Red"	2:00
5.	"Through and Through"	3:10
6.	"Words and Music"	5:14
7.	"Thursday"	2:10
8.	"Bad Seed"	6:02
9.	"My Eyes"	2:58
10.	"Respect"	4:27
11.	"Method of Groove"	5:29
12.	"The Stain Remains"	4:39
13.	"Friday"	3:42
Total length:		50:32

River Runs Red – Digipak Edition (1994) Bonus Tracks:
No.	Title	Lyrics	Music	Length
14.	"Plexi Intro" (live)	[instrumental]	Alan Robert; Joey Zampella	2:21
15.	"Respect" (live)			4:11
16.	"This Time" (live)			5:45
17.	"Through and Through" (live)			3:22
Total length:				66:02

River Runs Red - The Top Shelf Edition (2008) Bonus Tracks:
No.	Title	Lyrics	Music	Length
14.	"Here I Am, Here I Stay"		Alan Robert; Joey Zampella	5:22
15.	"Depression"		Alan Robert; Joey Zampella	5:57
16.	"3 Companions"	Keith Caputo	Alan Robert; Joey Zampella; Keith Caputo	3:23
17.	"Plexiglass Gate"		Alan Robert; Joey Zampella	5:09
Total length:				70:15

River Runs Red - The Top Shelf Edition (2008) Bonus DVD:
No.	Title	Length
1.	"Through and Through" (video)	3:10
2.	"This Time" (video)	4:47
3.	"Through and Through" (Live at Dynamo Open Air Festival '95)	5:05
4.	"River Runs Red" (Live at Dynamo Open Air Festival '95)	2:00
Total length:		15:02

== Credits ==
Life of Agony:

- Keith Caputo – lead vocals, keyboards
- Joey Z – guitar, backing vocals, co-lead vocals on "Method of Groove"
- Alan Robert – bass, backing vocals, co-lead vocals on "Method of Groove", cover design
- Sal Abruscato – drums

Additional:

- Josh Silver – producer
- Joe Marciano – engineer
- Ed Reed – engineer
- George Marino – mastering
- Linda Aversa – photography
- Al Bello – photography
- John Richard – photography

River Runs Red – The Top Shelf Edition (2008) credits:

- Produced for reissue by Monte Connor
- Remastered by Ted Jenson at Sterling Sound, NYC – June 2006
- Project coordinator: Steven Hartong
- DVD authored by Bionic Mastering
- Liner notes by J. Bennet
- Design by Mr. Scott Design
- Additional photos by Linda Aversa, Dirk Zumpe and Chris Toliver
- Bonus tracks taken from the 1999 Life of Agony compilation album 1989–1999

== Charts ==
Chart (1994)	Peak position
German Albums (Offizielle Top 100)	71

Chart (2013)	Peak position
US Vinyl Albums (Billboard)	11
