= Ugly (Life of Agony album) =

Studio album by Life of Agony
- Released: October 10, 1995
- Recorded: System Two (Brooklyn, New York)
- Genre: Alternative metal
- Length: 53:10
- Label: Roadrunner
- Producer: Steve Thompson

Life of Agony chronology
River Runs Red (1993)	Ugly (1995)	Soul Searching Sun (1997)

Singles from Ugly
- 1. "Lost at 22" Released: 1995; 2. "Let's Pretend" Released: 1996

Ugly is the second studio album by the American alternative metal band Life of Agony. Produced by Steve Thompson, the album was released on October 10, 1995, by Roadrunner Records. It was their first album to reach the Billboard 200 peaking at 153.

Original drummer, Sal Abruscato, left the band after the album's tour in 1996, but later rejoined for their first, River Runs Again reunion in 2003. Abruscato would ultimately leave the band for the final time in 2018. In 2025 the band did a worldwide tour celebration of the albums 30th anniversary playing it in its entirety.

== Recording and production ==
Known for his work with bands such as Guns N' Roses and Metallica, producer Steve Thompson was brought in to work on the album, which was recorded at Systems Two Studios in Brooklyn, New York. Thompson also mixed Ugly with his longtime partner Michael Barbiero.

The album saw a change in sound from their debut record River Runs Red, In an interview with Revolver Alan Robert commented on the change in style stating “With Ugly we wanted to grow beyond River, crafting memorable hooks over heavy riffs, even tuning lower on some tracks to push the sound heavier. Roadrunner gave us a bigger budget, so we worked with Steve Thompson and Michael Barbiero, who’d worked with Metallica and Guns N’ Roses, which at the time seemed like a great opportunity. Between the short writing window, a new production team, and the band dynamics at the time, all of that contributed to why the two records sound so different.” The album also seen vocalist Keith Caputo introduce more melody-forward performances along with pop-adjacent hooks on songs like “Let’s Pretend” and “How It Would Be.”

== Writing ==
Alan Robert claimed that this record was lead singer Keith Caputo’s breakthrough as a song writer, “Keith came in with more ideas, and they were incredibly emotional and honest. Songs like “Let’s Pretend” and “How Would It Be?” gave us a chance to show another side of Life of Agony, and fans really connected with that vulnerability.”

While Ugly isn’t a formal concept album, there are recurring themes throughout such as alienation, loneliness, despair, along with the idea of having to wear a mask to fit in with the world. The number 22 appears a lot in the album because that was the age Robert was while working on the record he stated “it shaped the record’s tone.” In that same interview with Revolver Robert compared the albums lyrics to a diary “I was in a very dark place back then and I even thought about taking my own life. Those feelings poured into the songs.”

== Limited edition ==
In 1995, Roadrunner Records issued a limited, European edition of the album in a custom, tin metal case. This edition featured exclusive artwork and two bonus tracks recorded during the Ugly recording sessions. Alternate mixes/versions of these bonus tracks were later released on the 1989-1999 compilation album. However, the versions found on the European limited edition of Ugly are the original Steve Thompson and Michael Barbiero mixes and are exclusive to the metal box release.

== Critical reception ==
Professional ratings
Review scores
Source	Rating
AllMusic	link
Collector's Guide to Heavy Metal	8/10

AllMusic's Stephen Thomas Erlewine praised the album writing in his review: "For listeners unaccustomed to blistering, noisy metal, Life of Agony will be agonizing. However, fans of the genre will find the band to be among the best of the mid-'90s, capable of spitting out razor-sharp riffs. What makes Ugly work is the band's grasp of sonic texture -- they can make even their quiet moments menacing."

Metal Sucks.net described the album as “a combination of heaviness, groove, melody and crushingly dark emotion that you don’t come across very often.”

=== Legacy ===
While celebrating the albums 30th anniversary in 2025 two of the original members of the band reflected on the album:

Joey Z stated “Everyone was expecting River Runs Red, Part 2, but Ugly was a left, right, and U-turn! People were like, ‘Okay, this is different?!’” “It took some time to sink its hooks into our listeners, but when it did, it became a classic.”

The bands main songwriter Alan Robert added “Ugly was probably the most emotionally vulnerable record we ever made. It was a big risk back then—to release something so different from River Runs Red — but we were just in a much different headspace, and we always wore our hearts on our sleeves. The album ended up connecting with people in a deep, lasting way.” “I can’t tell you how many people have broken down in tears telling us that the Ugly album saved their lives because they saw themselves in those songs.”

== Track listing ==
No.	Title	Lyrics	Music	Length
1.	"Seasons"	Keith Caputo	Sal Abruscato, Caputo	5:41
2.	"I Regret"	Alan Robert	Robert, Abruscato, Caputo	4:22
3.	"Lost at 22"	Robert	Robert, Abruscato	4:00
4.	"Other Side of the River"	Robert	Robert, Joey Z.	4:06
5.	"Let's Pretend"	Caputo	Caputo	4:02
6.	"Ugly"	Robert	Robert, Abruscato, Caputo	5:53
7.	"Drained"	Robert	Robert, Abruscato	4:11
8.	"How it Would Be"	Caputo	Caputo	4:36
9.	"Unstable"	Robert	Robert, Abruscato	4:32
10.	"Damned If I Do"	Robert	Robert, Abruscato, Caputo	3:44
11.	"Fears"	Robert	Robert, Abruscato	2:41
12.	"Don't You (Forget About Me)"	Keith Forsey, Steve Schiff	Forsey, Schiff	6:11
Total length:				53:10

European Metal Box Limited Edition Bonus Tracks
No.	Title	Lyrics	Music	Length
13.	"Coffee Break"	Caputo	Abruscato, Caputo	5:04
14.	"Redemption Song"	Bob Marley	Marley	3:58
Total length:				62:10

== Personnel ==
Life of Agony

- Keith Caputo – vocals
- Sal Abruscato – drums
- Alan Robert – bass guitar
- Joey Z. – lead & rhythm guitar

Additional musicians

- Ed Terry – keyboards and synthesizers (on "Unstable")

Technical

- Steve Thompson – production
- Steve Thompson and Michael Barbiero – mixing
- Mike Marciano, Eddie Reed and Jay Ryan – engineering
- George Marino – mastering

== Charts ==
Chart (1995)	Peak position
Belgium Flanders (Ultratop)	23
Germany (GfK Entertainment)	39
Netherlands (Dutch Top 100)	79
UK (Official Charts)	116
UK Rock and Metal (Official Charts)	16
US Billboard 200	153
US US Heatseekers (Billboard)	8
