= Life of Agony =

American metal band

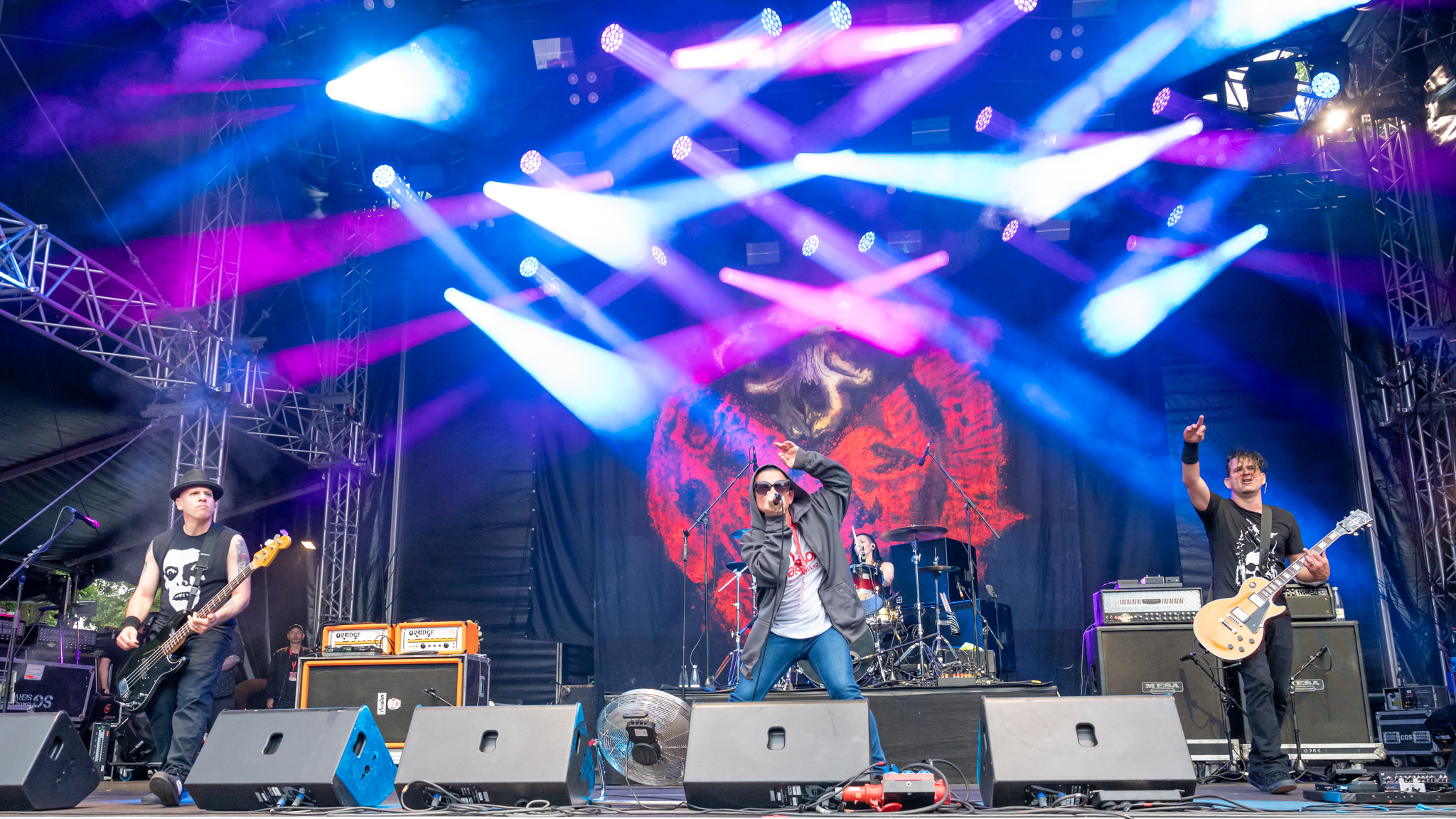
- Life of Agony performing in Germany 2024

Background information
- Origin: New York City, U.S.
- Genre: Alternative metal
- Years active: 1989–1999; 2002–2012; 2014–present
- Labels: Roadrunner; SPV; Epic; I Scream; Napalm
- Members: Keith Caputo; Alan Robert; Joey Z.; Veronica Bellino
- Past members: Whitfield Crane; Dan Richardson; Sal Abruscato; Mike Palmeri; Eric Chan; Kenny Pedersen
- Website: lifeofagony.com

Life of Agony is an American alternative metal band from Brooklyn, New York City, formed in 1989 by singer Keith Caputo, (Note: Known as Mina Caputo from 2011 to 2024.) bassist Alan Robert and guitarist Joey Z. The band has released six studio albums to date, most notably their 1993 debut River Runs Red, named by Rolling Stone as one of the Greatest Metal Albums of All Time.

The band was formed in 1989 by Joey Zampella, his cousin Keith Caputo and Alan Robert, the group has gone through multiple drummers but these 3 have remained stables of the band. The bands first recorded River Runs Red was released in 1993 and was followed by Ugly in 1995, and Soul Searching Sun in 1997. However in 2002 the band broke up due to Caputo stepping award from the band, Whitfield Crane briefly filled in on tours however Robert and Zampella decided the band couldn't continue without Caputo. In 2003 the original lineup reunited for two sold-out shows in New York and eventually released 2005's Broken Valley. Caputo came out as transgender in 2011 and transitioned to female then known as Mina, the band then shortly broke up again soon thereafter in 2012. However following a 2 year hiatus they reunited in 2014 and released A Place Where There's No More Pain, their first studio album in 12 years, on April 28, 2017. In 2018 their longest tenured drummer Sal Abruscato left the group for good and was replaced by Veronica Bellino. Their most recent album The Sound of Scars was released in 2019. In late 2024 Caputo started detransitioning and has started going by Keith again.

== History ==
=== Formation and River Runs Red (1989–1994) ===
The band was formed in the summer of 1989 by singer Keith Caputo, bassist Alan Robert, and guitarist Joey Zampella (who used Joey Z. as an alias). The group recorded a handful of demos produced by Josh Silver of Type O Negative. Their initial drummer was Kenny Pedersen, who was replaced by Eric Chan in the latter half of 1990. Chan was then replaced by Mike Palmeri in 1991. Life of Agony performed up and down the East Coast, developing a loyal fan base. The band eventually signed to Roadrunner Records, and Palmeri was replaced by Type O Negative drummer Sal Abruscato to solidify the lineup. Roadrunner released their debut album River Runs Red in 1993. The following year, Life of Agony continued to build a following, and toured with the likes of Carcass, Pro-Pain, God Lives Underwater, KMFDM, Korn, and more.

Music videos and promotional singles would be released for the songs "This Time" and "Through and Through". The music video for "This Time" would be featured in an episode of Beavis and Butt-Head, while both videos would find occasional airplay on Headbangers Ball, which gave the band early exposure. In 2005 the album was inducted into the Decibel Hall of Fame.

In late 1994, during a concert at L'Amour in Brooklyn, a fan died after falling from the stage while apparently trying to stage-dive. A security guard and, to a lesser extent, the band were implicated in a lawsuit which was eventually dropped with no charges filed. At subsequent concerts the band were mindful of the potential for fans to injure themselves, often trying to cool down the mosh pit between songs if things were rough. An example of this would be seen on the River Runs Again DVD, in which Caputo is heard saying "Everybody watch over each other out in the pit, we already lost a life." and "No lives lost, right?"

=== Ugly (1995–1996) ===
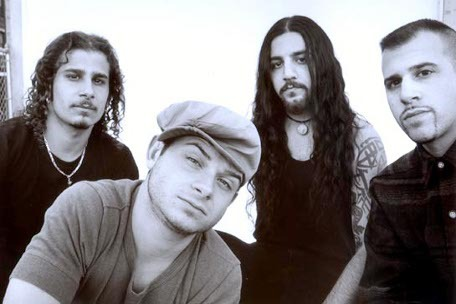
The band in the mid-1990s

River Runs Red was followed by the more emotional Ugly album in 1995. It was produced by Steve Thompson, who would become a Grammy winner in later years. The album peaked at No. 153 on the Billboard 200, the band's first appearance on a Billboard chart. "Lost At 22" and "Let's Pretend" were both released as singles, but did not chart. Following the release of Ugly, Life of Agony began touring alongside Anthrax and Deftones before embarking on an US arena tour with Ozzy Osbourne and Korn.

Drummer Abruscato left Life of Agony after the accompanying tour. His successor was ex-Pro-Pain and ex-Crumbsuckers drummer Dan Richardson.

=== Soul Searching Sun, Caputo's departure, and breakup (1997–2002) ===
Life of Agony released their third album Soul Searching Sun in September 1997. It marked a slight change of style for the band. The album charted at No. 157 on the Billboard 200, slightly lower than the band's previous effort; however, the lead single "Weeds" peaked at No. 27 on the Billboard Mainstream Rock chart, and lingered on the chart for over 3 months. The second single, "Tangerine", would peak at No. 37 on the same chart.

Despite the growing success of "Weeds" and the band's mainstream attention, Caputo departed the band shortly after the release of Soul Searching Sun in September 1997. Caputo was struggling with internalised gender dysphoria and was becoming disillusioned with the masculine image of herself she was faking at the time. "What good is my success if I can't even enjoy my fucking soul and my body?' I wanted to come out then, but failed miserably and didn't have the courage or the knowhow. I didn't know what to do." Caputo decided to distance herself from the band completely; "It took me to quit the band because I wasn't being true to myself. I had to get away from my band, the label, everyone I worked with." At the time, the band did not understand Caputo's reasons for wanting to quit the band, with Alan Robert saying, "She just [told the band] she was in too much pain to continue."

The band then toured with ex-Ugly Kid Joe singer Whitfield Crane, went back into the studio, and kicked Crane out of the band in the span of one year. They contemplated moving Robert to vocals and guitar and adding former Stuck Mojo bassist Corey Lowery, but decided they did not want to continue under the Life of Agony banner without Caputo; thus, they decided to split in 1999. Robert started Among Thieves with former members of Biohazard and the rest of the band started Stereomud with Erik Rogers on vocals, both not straying far from Life of Agony's style. A live CD with the band's unplugged performance at the Dutch Lowlands Festival from 1997 was released in 2000.

=== First reunion and Broken Valley (2003–2011) ===
In 2002, Caputo’s father died, this resulted in him, Joey Z and Alan Robert all reuniting at the funeral. It was at this funeral where they decided to play a couple of reunion shows.

Then on January 3 and 4, 2003, the original lineup reunited for two sold-out shows at New York's Irving Plaza. Both shows were recorded and released on CD/DVD later that same year. The reunion resulted in several more shows and appearances on European festivals, as well as the recording of 2005's Broken Valley, the band's first new studio album since 1997 and their first on the Sony-owned Epic Records. The original album contained a controversial copy protection method that would later be seen in court. Broken Valley was a commercial disappointment for Epic despite reaching No. 147 on the Billboard 200, the band's highest position yet. The album's lead single, "Love to Let You Down", peaked at No. 25 on the Billboard Mainstream Rock chart. At the end of 2005, the label and the band parted ways.

Caputo later stated "That experience killed this band in a lot of ways. The label didn't understand who this band was and continually tried to mold us into something we weren't. Not to mention the illegal spyware they put on our album without our knowledge to try and prevent piracy, and the class-action lawsuit they lost because of it. The court forced them to pull all of our records off the shelf just three months after it was released! The whole thing was a nightmare. We didn't want to make new music for a long time after that."

Life of Agony went on to tour with Megadeth, Dream Theater, and numerous other metal bands during 2005's Gigantour. Three years after their tour in 2005, Life of Agony released a CD/DVD set for River Runs Red with bonus tracks and videos from their early career. During this period the band started to play less live shows then they had in the past, this was partly due to the members being involved in other endeavors as Robert started Spoiler NYC as a side project and Caputo was featured on the 2007 track "What Have You Done" from the band Within Temptation. The song had been a minor hit all around the world.

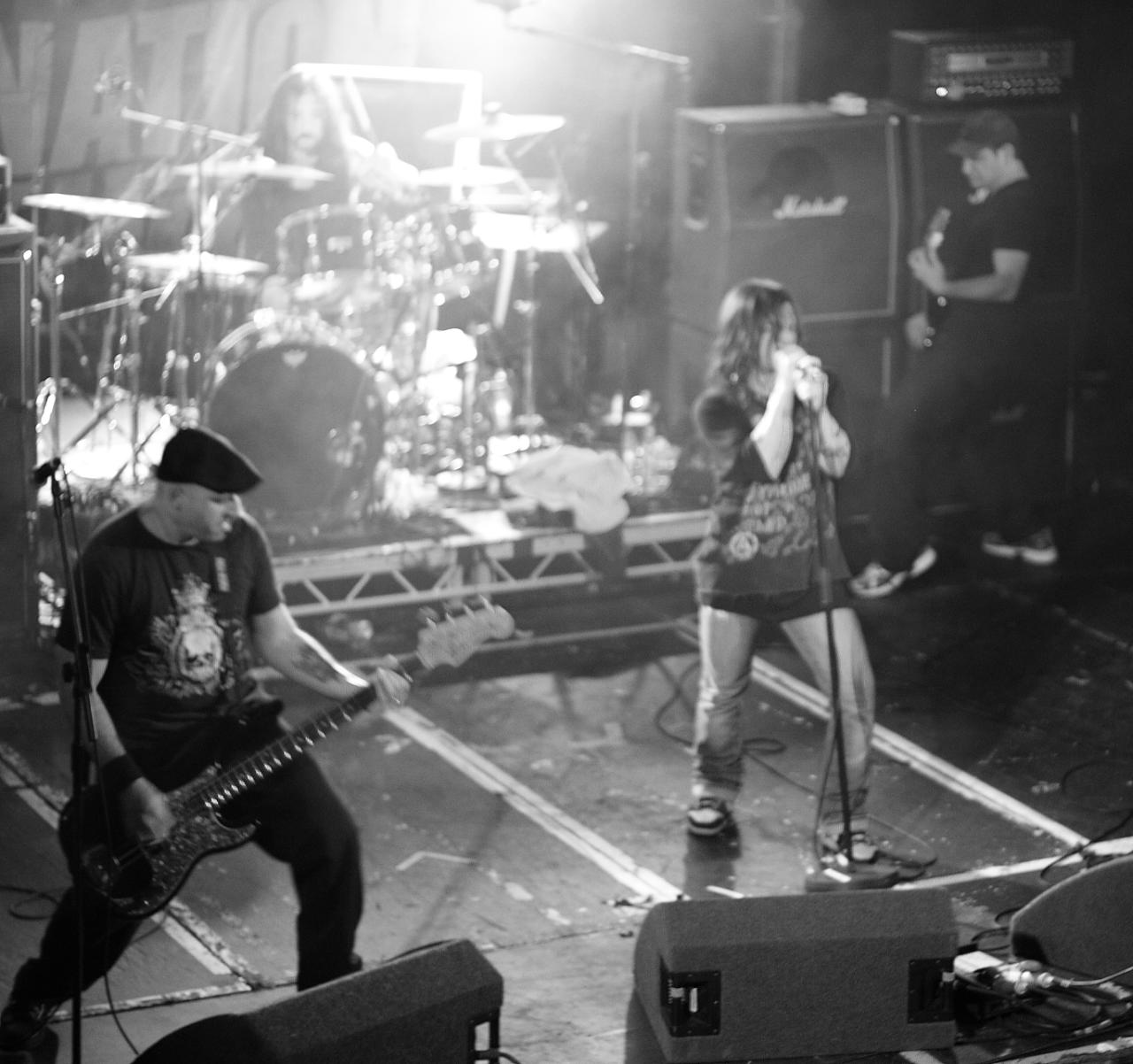
Life of Agony performing at the 2009 Damnation Festival

During a live show in Brussels on April 3, 2010 the band played "River Runs Red" in its entirety.This was then turned into a live album and was released in July of that year. During a December 2010 appearance on MTV's Headbangers Ball, Life of Agony announced they were writing new material. Abruscato stated in the interview that they were "Going to start with one song and see if there is a good enough spark to continue writing. This is something special for the fans for their patience."

By the summer of 2011, the band attempted to write new material, only to feel it was being forced and not natural. In between, Abruscato created A Pale Horse Named Death, Joey Z. was still running his New York-based Method of Groove Studio, Caputo would focus on various solo projects, and Robert was working on his second comic for IDW and a film of his first comic called Wire Hangers.

=== Second split (2012–2013) ===
In a February 2012 interview, Abruscato confirmed that Life of Agony was disbanded. He explained "We're not gonna play [anymore]. We moved out of our studio. We all kind of feel like we're at the end. We're never gonna make another record, because of those kinds of problems I was talking about [earlier in the interview] – we can't agree on writing a song. And [Keith] Caputo (vocals) wants to pursue [his] lifestyle. And that's pretty much the reason why also I've moved on and I'm doing my own thing...to just keep going; I didn't want my career to stop with Life of Agony. Life of Agony doesn't tour, Life of Agony doesn't do much. And so we were at a point where it was like...we did the last three shows in July [2011] and then we moved out of our studio, and that's it. I don't foresee anything in the future; I highly doubt it. I don't know how that would happen."

In a July 2012 interview with Revolver Magazine, Robert described his attitude towards the state of the band, and said "I actually don't think [Keith]'s transition is the ultimate reason the band isn't active right now. We'd been doing a lot less touring over the last bunch of years, way before [he] announced [his] personal news. I can only speak for myself, but I can say that starting a family has definitely made me want to tour and travel a lot less in general. For that reason in particular, I'm much happier being home working on my comics and film projects. It fulfills my creative needs and allows me to live the life I want to at this stage."

=== Second reunion A Place Where There's No More Pain and The Sound of Scars (2014–2021) ===
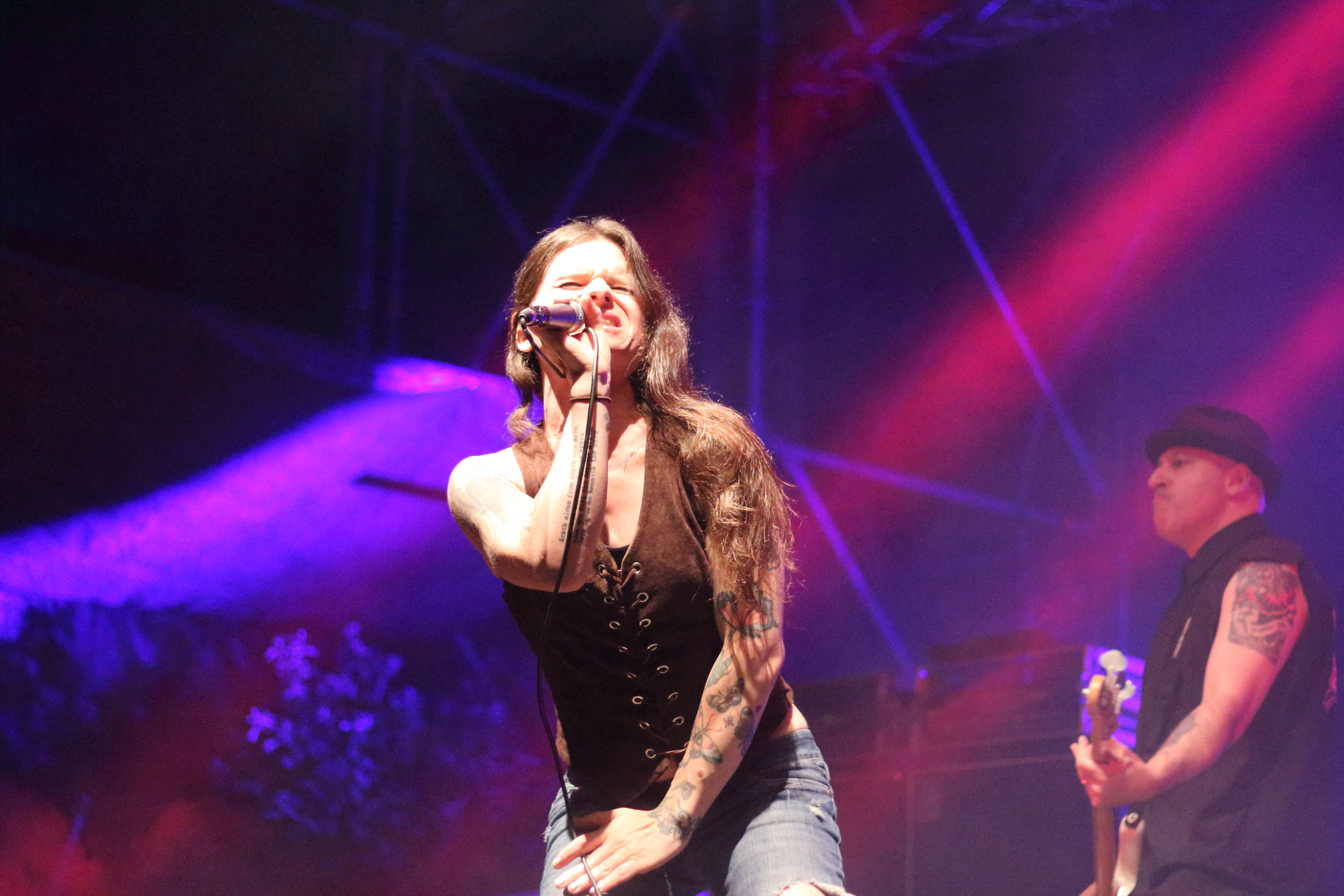
Keith Caputo at the PictureOn Festival 2014

On March 22, 2014, Life of Agony confirmed on their official website that they were active again, and performed their first show since Caputo's gender confirmation at the Alcatraz Hard Rock & Metal Festival in Kortrijk, Belgium on August 8. The band continued touring in 2015 playing shows in the US along with festival appearances in Europe.

On January 12, 2016, Life of Agony announced that they were signed to Napalm Records, and released A Place Where There's No More Pain, their first studio album in 12 years, on April 28, 2017. The album peaked at No. 3 on Billboard's Heatseekers Albums, No. 7 on Billboard's Independent Albums and No. 24 on the Top Hard Rock Albums and was met with critical acclaim. Being viewed as a strong return to form, with critics praising the album for Caputo's confident and heartfelt vocals, heavy riffs, and a blend of darkness and hope. In December of that same year, drummer Abruscato would leave the band for the second time, and was replaced by Veronica Bellino. While no official reason has been disclosed, Keith Caputo has accused Abruscato of transphobia and gaslighting as the reason he was kicked out, though he has disputed these claims.

The band announced the release, in October 2019, of its sixth studio album The Sound of Scars on Napalm Records again, which was being billed as "Chapter Two" to their debut River Runs Red. The concept album, hailed by Loudwire as one of the year's "Most Anticipated Hard Rock & Metal Albums" was produced and mixed by Grammy Award-winning producer Sylvia Massy and co-produced by the band's guitarist Joey Z, while engineer Howie Weinberg handled mastering duties.

On August 9, 2019, the lead single "Scars" premiered on Billboard. The Sound of Scars would ultimately peak at 35 on the US Billboard's Independent Albums. The album received critical acclaim being viewed as a worthy sequel to the band's debut, River Runs Red, and was named Album of the Year by The Aquarian. The group then went on tour in support of the album which lasted till December and included dates in North America and Europe.

In early 2020 the band went on co headlining tour with Doyle, however they had to reschedule some of the May and April dates to September due to the COVID-19 pandemic.

=== Sound of Scars documentary/working on new material (2022–present) ===
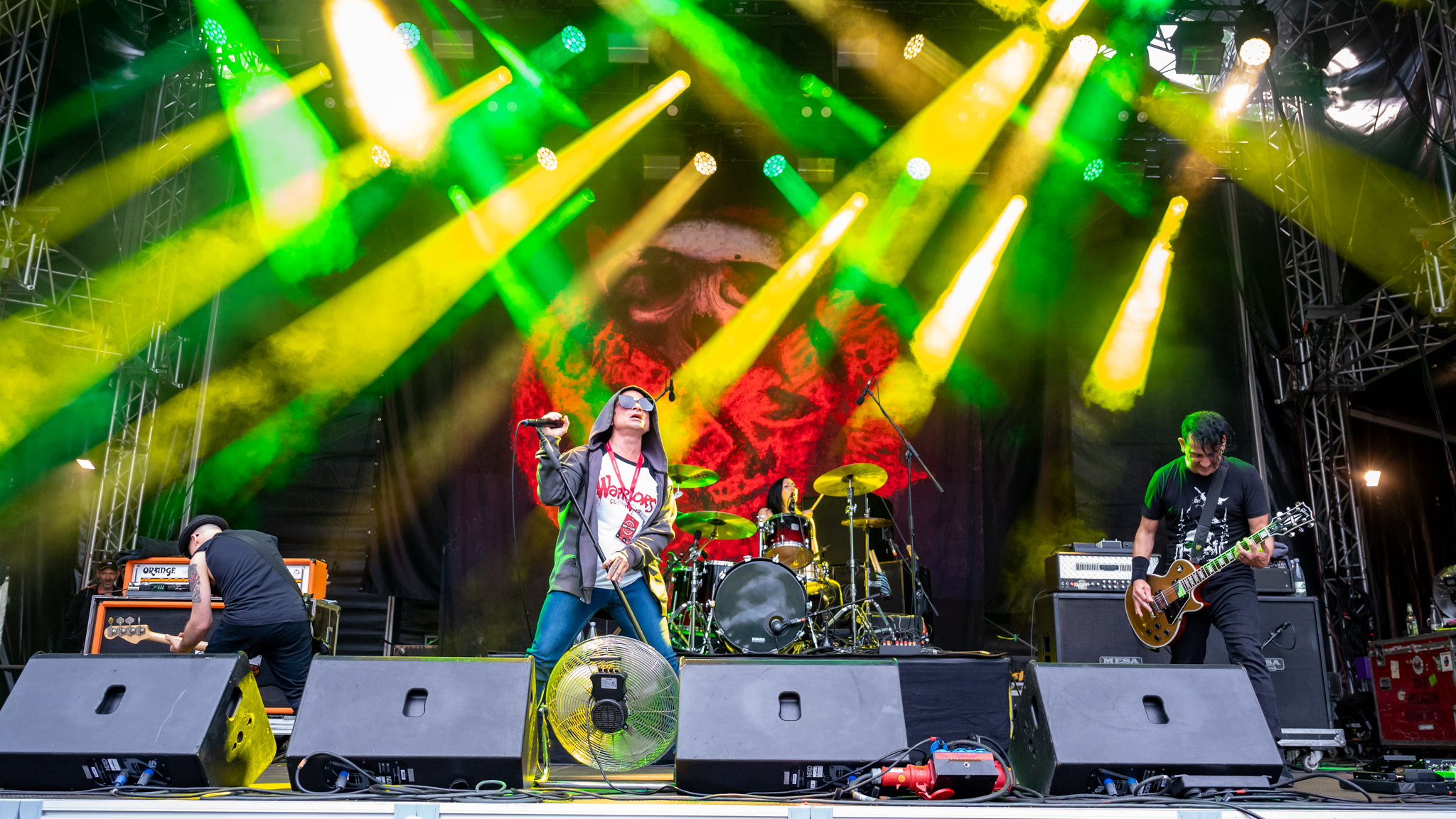
Life of Agony at the Concertbüro Franken Festival in Germany in 2024

A documentary film, also titled The Sound of Scars, was released by Cinedigm in association with Raven Banner Entertainment in 2022. The film was directed by Leigh Brooks and included interviews with the band members and their families. The film also included archival footage, photographs, lost interviews, and go over various points of the band's history, including Keith Caputo's gender transition. A portion of ticket sales from the film's Director's Cut Screening were donated to the National Suicide Prevention Lifeline and All Out. The film was featured by The British Film Institute's BFI Flare Festival.

In 2022 the group did a small west coast tour along with playing at some European festivals. By December 2022, Life of Agony had begun working on new material for the follow-up to The Sound of Scars. The band also celebrated the 30th anniversary of their first album River Runs Red in 2023 with a world tour, the European leg went of the tour went from January to February of 2023 with support from Prong and Madball. They also embarked on a separate co headlining tour with Sick of it All in April, before embarking on the US leg of the River Runs Red 30th Anniversary tour in August.

In 2024 the band released a single titled "The Crow (In Memory of B.L.)" the song was created to celebrate the 30th anniversary of The Crow movie while also serving as tribute to Brandon Lee. It was released along with a cinematic, Crow-hailing music video. Robert who was a fan of the movie came up with the idea and Joey Z stated: "We thought that creating a song and a sound that would seamlessly fit on the original soundtrack and film would be a perfect way to honor Brandon and his legacy." In November of that same year it Caputo announced that he was detransitioning and would go by Keith again. In December Life of Agony went on a European tour called Up Close & Unplugged where they played their songs in acoustic.

On January 6, 2025 it was announced the band was inducted into the Metal Hall of Fame, they attended the 9th annual gala on January 22 in Anaheim California. In February they embarked on a co headlining tour with Biohazard with dates in the US and Europe. Later that same year the band celebrated the 30th anniversary of their album Ugly and on May 7, they announced a world tour in celebration of the album which started on September 19 and went till November 20th the US leg was supported by Jasta and the European leg was supported by Ugly Kid Joe. Life of Agony is scheduled to tour Europe with Hatebreed in the November of 2026.

== Musical style and influences ==
Life of Agony has mostly been described as alternative metal, but also as alternative rock, grunge, post-grunge, hard rock, and heavy metal. The band has also incorporated elements of hardcore punk into its sound, with Rivers Run Red being an alternative metal album with influences from grunge and New York hardcore.

According to the group members themselves, they were influenced by bands such as Radiohead, Metallica, Pink Floyd, Led Zeppelin, Stone Temple Pilots, Black Sabbath, and Social Distortion.

Perhaps the most striking difference between the River Runs Red and Ugly albums of the mid-90s and 2005's Broken Valley is the change in Caputo's vocal style, which gradually changed from a Danzig-esque baritone to a lighter, more conventional rock style later in the band's career. In a 2023 interview, Robert commented on the bands change in style:

"We never were really concerned with how people would respond to the songs we wrote. In fact, we set out to never repeat ourselves early on. That's why each album has a different vibe and the material is so different. Some fans want bands to just churn out the same record 10 times, but we always pushed ourselves to try new things. We always wanted to grow … as musicians, as songwriters, and as people."

Most of the band's merchandise is designed by comic artist and bassist Alan Robert.

=== Lyrical themes ===
Alan Robert has written the majority of the music and lyrics and Caputo wrote select ballads, mostly about her parents and homelife, particularly his mother. They are also known to touch upon personal mental health problems, with their debut album River Runs Red touching upon misanthropy, parental neglect, regret and killing yourself. These themes continued into their follow up records such as Ugly with Robert stating many of the songs on that record touched upon "feeling out of place," and, "feeling like the ugly duckling."

In a 2025 interview with Revolver while speaking on their album Ugly Robert stated:

We were addressing very personal mental health issues long before those topics were OK to talk about publicly, I can’t tell you how many people have broken down in tears telling us that the Ugly album saved their lives because they saw themselves in those songs.

== Side projects ==
The band continues to perform and make music together as well as pursuing individual projects. Caputo recorded several solo records with European musicians and has toured overseas to support those albums.

Robert, Life of Agony's primary songwriter, started Spoiler NYC in 2006. The group recorded an album called Grease Fire in Hell's Kitchen and filmed videos for the singles "Suicide Hotel" and "Ruined". Many reviewers praised the old-school approach to their street punk sound. He later established himself as a horror comics author and illustrator, releasing several critically acclaimed series for IDW Publishing. His creator-owned titles include Wire Hangers, Crawl to Me and Killogy. His horror-themed adult coloring book series The Beauty of Horror has a worldwide following and the title is currently being developed into an animated television series. Since 2016 Robert has also produced his own coloring book series.

Joey Z. created his own recording studio, Method of Groove, in Brooklyn, New York City, which was opened in February 2011; the studio and its equipment were completely destroyed during Hurricane Sandy in October 2012. More recently he has started releasing instrumental music for film and television.

Veronica Bellino makes her own individual music and has done work as a producer.

== Awards and nominations ==
Decibel Hall of Fame

Year	Work/nommine	Award	Result
2005	River Runs Red	Decibel Hall of Fame	Inducted

The Aquarian

Year	Work/nommine	Award	Result
2019	The Sound of Scars	Album of the year	Won

Metal Hall of Fame

Year	Work/nommine	Award	Result
2025	Life of Agony	Metal Hall of Fame	Inducted

== Band members ==
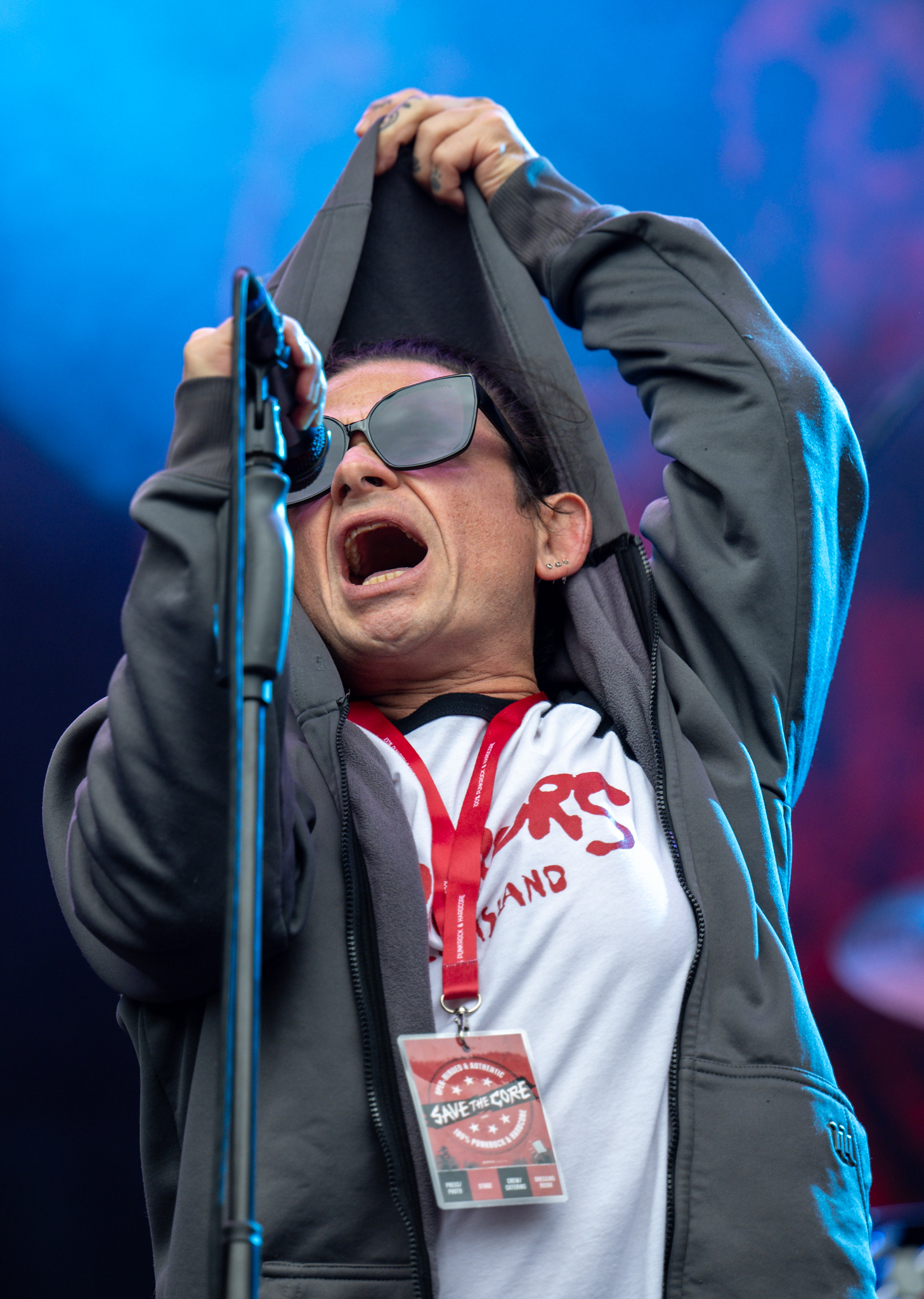
Keith (as Mina) Caputo

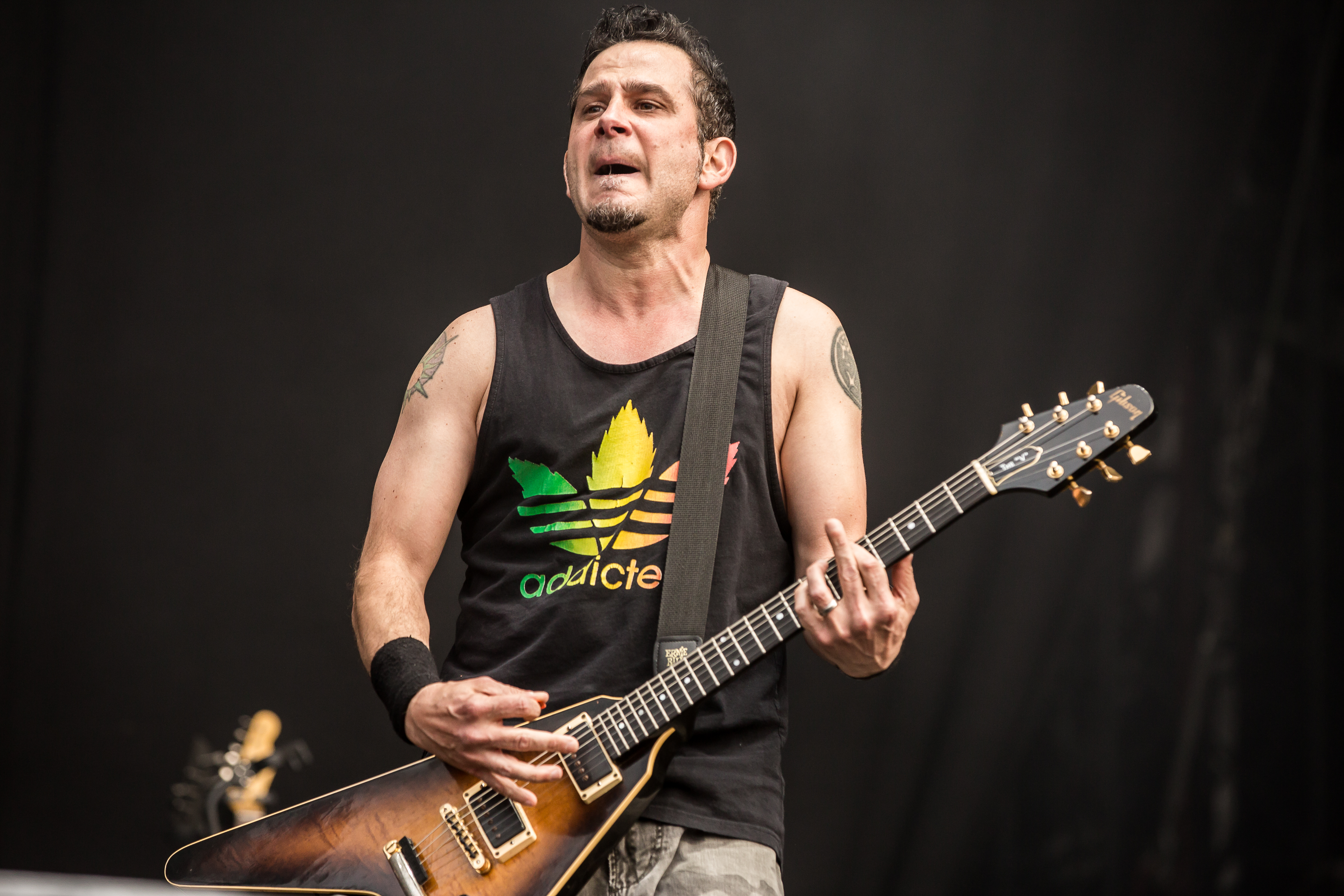
Joey Z

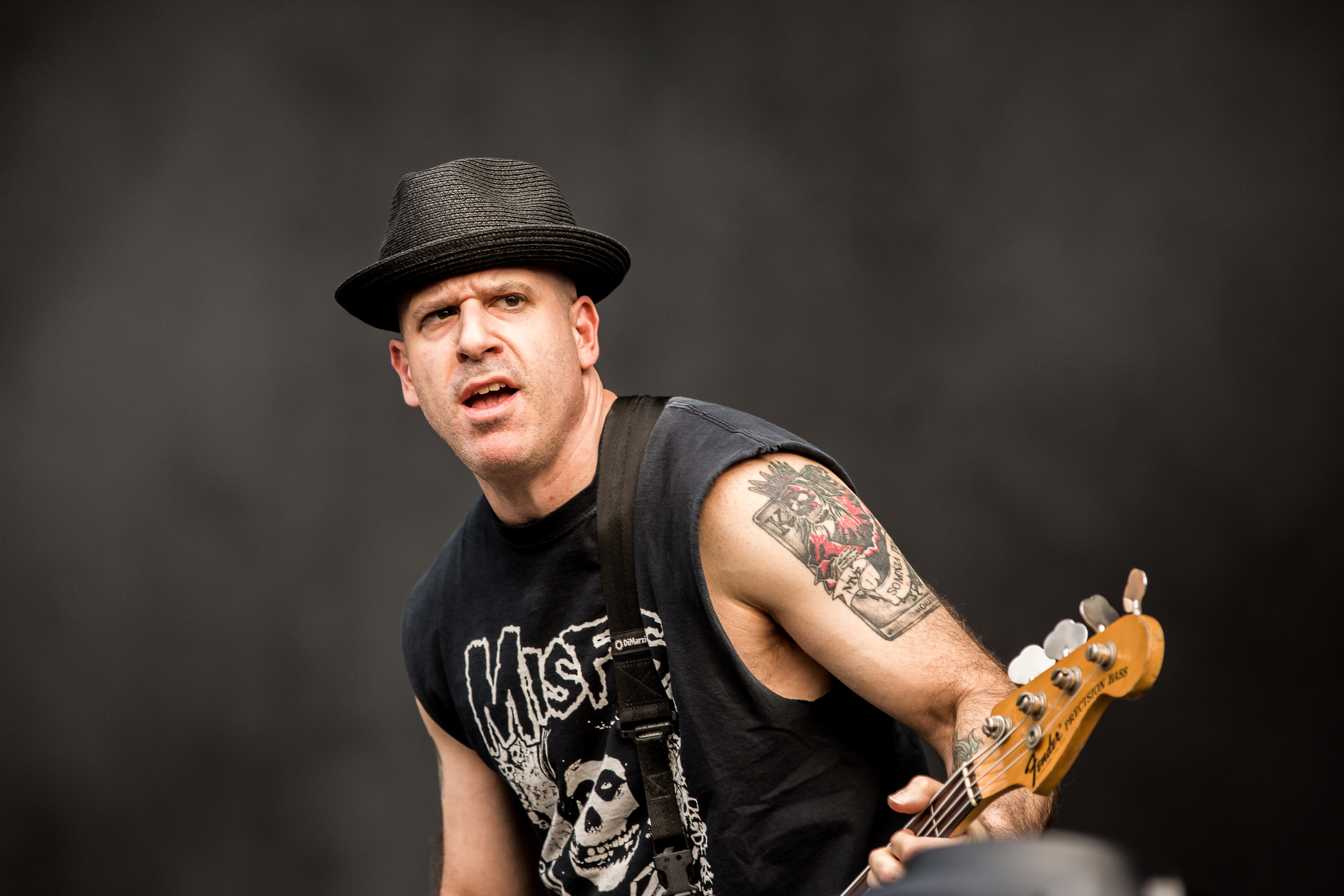
Alan Robert

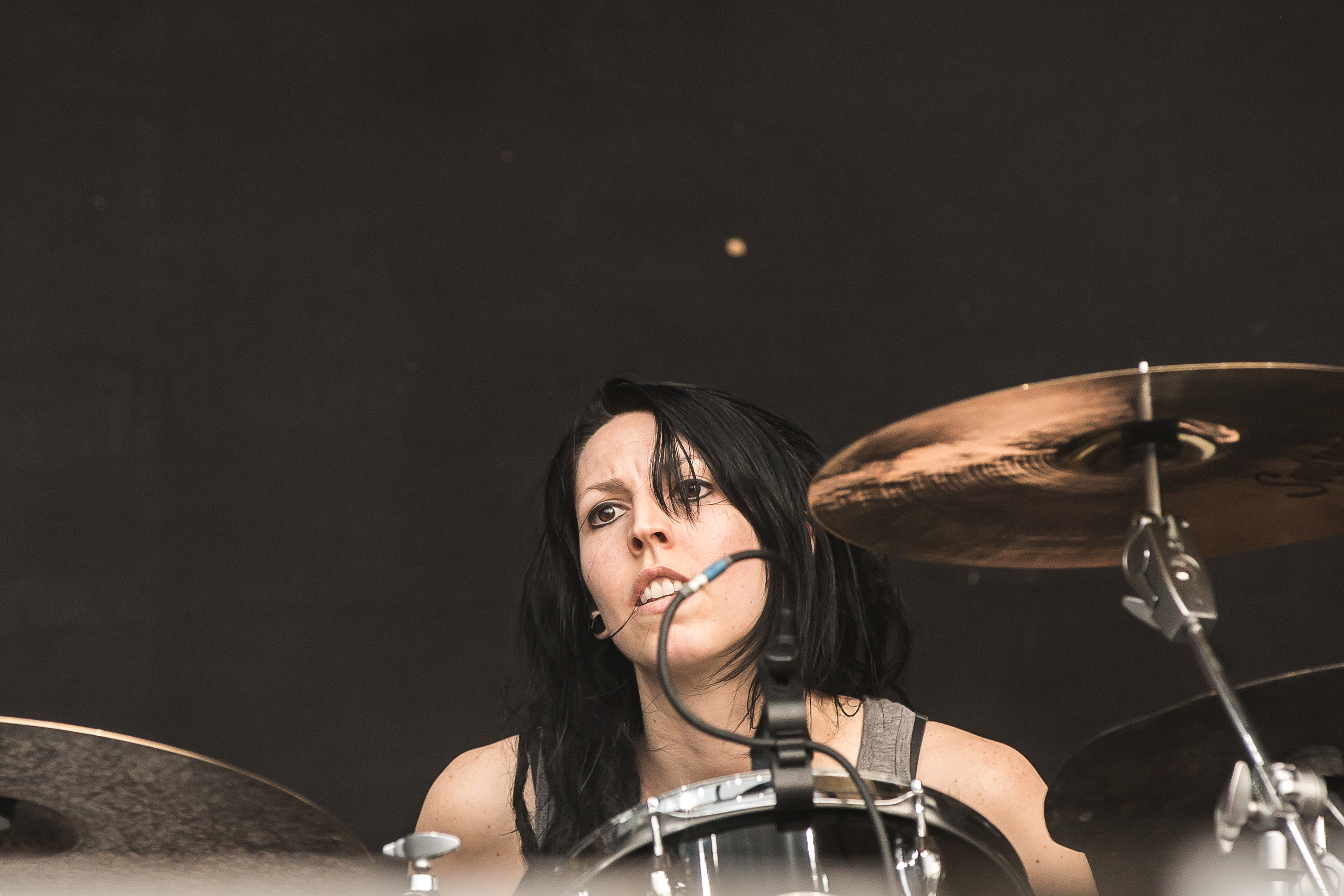
Veronica Bellino

Current members

- Keith Caputo – lead vocals (1989–1997, 2002–2012, 2014–present)
- Alan Robert – bass guitar, backing vocals (1989–1999, 2002–2012, 2014–present)
- Joseph "Joey Z." Zampella – guitars, backing vocals (1989–1999, 2002–2012, 2014–present)
- Veronica Bellino – drums (2018–present)

Former members

- Kenny Pedersen – drums (1989–1990)
- Eric Chan – drums (1990–1991)
- Mike Palmeri – drums (1991–1992)
- Sal Abruscato – drums (1992–1996, 2002–2012, 2014–2017)
- Dan Richardson – drums (1996–1999)
- Whitfield Crane – lead vocals (1997–1998)

Timeline

== Discography ==
- River Runs Red (1993)
- Ugly (1995)
- Soul Searching Sun (1997)
- Broken Valley (2005)
- A Place Where There's No More Pain (2017)
- The Sound of Scars (2019)
