= Greatest Hits (Seals & Crofts album) =

1975 compilation album by Seals and Crofts

Greatest hits album by Seals and Crofts
- Released: November 1975
- Genre: Soft rock
- Length: 39:23
- Label: Warner Bros.
- Producer: Louie Shelton

Seals and Crofts chronology
I'll Play for You (1975)	Greatest Hits (1975)	Get Closer (1976)

Professional ratings
Review scores
Source	Rating
AllMusic	4.5/5 stars

Greatest Hits is a compilation album by Seals and Crofts, released in November 1975 by Warner Bros. Records. It includes a new recording of the song "When I Meet Them," the first version of which appeared on Year of Sunday. The other songs were the same versions released on their previous four albums.

== Track listing ==
All tracks are written by James Seals and Dash Crofts, except where noted.

Side one
No.	Title	Original release	Length
1.	"When I Meet Them"	New recording of the song featured on Year of Sunday	3:38
2.	"Diamond Girl"	Diamond Girl (1973)	4:10
3.	"Hummingbird"	Summer Breeze (1972)	4:35
4.	"Castles in the Sand"	I'll Play for You (1975)	4:05
5.	"East of Ginger Trees"	Summer Breeze	3:46

Side two
No.	Title	Writer(s)	Original release	Length
1.	"I'll Play for You"		I'll Play for You	4:04
2.	"Ruby Jean and Billie Lee"		Diamond Girl	4:07
3.	"King of Nothing"	Seals	Unborn Child (1974)	3:19
4.	"Summer Breeze"		Summer Breeze	3:24
5.	"We May Never Pass This Way (Again)"		Diamond Girl	4:15

== Charts ==
=== Weekly charts ===
Chart (1975–77)	Peak position
Canada Top Albums/CDs (RPM)	8
New Zealand Albums (RMNZ)	2
US Billboard 200	11

=== Year-end charts ===
Chart (1975)	Position
Canada Top Albums/CDs (RPM)	99
New Zealand Albums (RMNZ)	15
Chart (1976)	Position
New Zealand Albums (RMNZ)	29
