= Seals & Crofts I & II =

Compilation album by Seals & Crofts
- Released: 1974
- Genre: Soft rock
- Label: Warner Bros.
- Producer: Bob Alcivar and John Simon: Allmusic link

Seals & Crofts chronology
Unborn Child (1974)	Seals & Crofts I & II (1974)	I'll Play for You (1975)

Seals & Crofts I & II is a double album re-issue of their albums, Seals & Crofts and Down Home. In early 1974, while the duo were at the peak of their popularity, Warner Bros. Records decided it would be a good investment to purchase the rights to their first two LPs on the TA label, which by that time, were out of print. Songs 1-12 were written by Jimmy Seals, except for Seven Valleys, which had some help from Dash Crofts. Songs 13-23 were written by Seals & Crofts, except where indicated otherwise.

== Track listing ==
1. "See My Life" - 3:21
2. "Sea Of Consciousness" - 2:36
3. "Seldom's Sister" - 2:41
4. "Not Be Found" - 2:53
5. "Birthday Of My Thoughts" - 4:39
6. "In Tune" - 3:15
7. "'Cows Of Gladness" - 3:25
8. "Earth" - 2:43
9. "Seven Valleys" (Seals/Crofts) - 1:36
10. "Jekyll And Hyde" - 1:51
11. "Ashes In The Snow" - 3:50
12. "See My Life (Reprise)" - :40
13. "Ridin' Thumb" - 3:53
14. "Hand-Me-Down Shoe" - 3:20
15. "Purple Hand" - 2:35
16. "Robin" - 1:53
17. "Hollow Reed" - 3:29
18. "Gabriel Go On Home" - 3:54
19. "Tin Town" - 3:14
20. "Today" - 3:43
21. "Cottonmouth" - 3:44
22. "Granny, Will Your Dog Bite?" (Seals) - :38
23. "Leave" (Seals/Trombatore) - 4:18

== Charts ==
Chart (1974)	Peak position
Canada	49
