= Sudan Village =

Live album by Seals and Crofts
- Released: December 1976
- Genre: Rock
- Label: Warner Bros.
- Producer: Louie Shelton

Seals and Crofts chronology
Get Closer (1976)	Sudan Village (1976)	One on One (1977)

Professional ratings
Review scores
Source	Rating
Allmusic	2/5 stars

Sudan Village is a live album by Seals & Crofts. It features the single "Baby I'll Give It to You", which reached #58 on Billboard's charts, #85 on the RPM charts, and #5 on the RPM AC charts. Other songs making their first appearance on a Seals & Crofts album were "Thunderfoot", "Put Your Love in My Hands", "Arkansas Traveller", and "Eighth of January".

== Track listing ==
1. "Sudan Village" (James Seals, Dash Crofts)
2. "Advance Guards" (Seals, Crofts)
3. "Cause You Love" (Seals)
4. "Baby I'll Give It to You" (Lana Bogan, Seals)
5. "Thunderfoot" (Seals, Crofts, Louie Shelton, Hampton Hawes, David Hungate, Jeff Porcaro)
6. "East of Ginger Trees" (Seals, Crofts)
7. "Put Your Love in My Hands" (Bogan, Walter Health)
8. "Arkansas Traveller" (Traditional)
9. "Eighth of January" (Tommy Jackson)

== Charts ==
Chart (1976–1977)	Peak position
Canada	90
US Top LPs & Tape (Billboard)	73

== Personnel ==
All tracks except "Baby I'll Give It to You"

- Jim Seals – lead vocals, guitar, fiddle, saxophone
- Dash Crofts – lead vocals, mandolin
- Carolyn Willis – lead vocals on "Cause You Love" and "Put Your Love in my Hands"
- Marty Walsh – guitar
- Bill Cuomo – keyboards
- Bobby Lichtig – bass
- Ralph Humphrey – drums
- Joe Porcaro – percussion
- Shirley Matthews, Marty McCall, and Becky Louis – backing vocals
- Louis Shelton – production

"Baby I'll Give It to You"

- Jim Seals – lead vocal, guitar
- Dash Crofts – mandolin
- Carolyn Willis – lead vocal
- Louis Shelton – production, guitar
- Dean Parks and Lee Ritenour – guitars
- Bill Cuomo – acoustic piano
- Joe Sample – electric piano
- Wilton Felder – bass
- Ed Greene – drums
- Joe Porcaro – percussion
- Gene Page – string arrangement
