= Takin' It Easy =

Studio album by Seals and Crofts
- Released: April 1978
- Genre: Rock, soft rock, disco
- Label: Warner Bros.
- Producer: Louie Shelton

Seals and Crofts chronology
One on One (1977)	Takin' It Easy (1978)	The Longest Road (1980)

Singles from Takin' It Easy
- 1. "You're the Love" Released: April 1978; 2. "Takin' It Easy" Released: August 1978

Professional ratings
Review scores
Source	Rating
AllMusic	3.5/5 stars

Takin' It Easy is the ninth studio album by Seals and Crofts, released in 1978 by Warner Bros. Records.

It was their last album to chart and contain any charting singles. "You're the Love" reached #18 in early 1978 and #8 in Canada. The title track reached #79 later the same year and #13 on the Canadian AC charts.

The title track has a more rock-oriented approach than was the band's usual fare, and was essentially a James Seals solo track, with Dash Crofts making no contribution to either writing or performing it. Seals in turn was absent from the album's second track, "One More Time". The album in general relied more heavily on outside musicians and songwriters than Seals and Crofts's previous albums, with the duo writing barely half the songs themselves and only occasionally performing anything other than lead vocals.

The cover photograph was taken at the historic Oak Alley Plantation in Louisiana.

== Track listing ==
1. "Takin' It Easy" (Sean MacLeod, Bob Phillips)
2. "One More Time" (Lewis Anderson) (Note: Anderson is the sole author of "One More Time" for copyright purposes, but the album notes credit Louie Shelton and Gary Sims for writing the intro section of the song.)
3. "Midnight Blue" (Jim Seals, Dash Crofts)
4. "You're the Love" (David Batteau, Louie Shelton)
5. "Sunrise" (Grant Gullickson, Brian Whitcomb)
6. "Breaking in a Brand New Love" (Seals, Crofts)
7. "Magnolia Moon" (Seals, Crofts)
8. "Nobody Gets Over Lovin' You" (Seals, Crofts)
9. "Forever Like the Rose" (Seals, Crofts)
10. "A Tribute to ʻAbdu'l-Bahá" (Seals, Crofts) (Note: The lyrics to the introductory chant are a poem by ʻAbdu'l-Bahá.)

== Personnel ==
- James Seals – lead vocals (except on "One More Time"), acoustic guitar (on "Midnight Blue", "Breaking in a Brand New Love", "Forever Like the Rose", and "A Tribute to ʻAbdu'l-Bahá"), tenor sax on "Sunrise"
- Dash Crofts – lead vocals (except on "Takin' It Easy" and "Midnight Blue"), mandolin
- Louie Shelton – production, guitars (except on "A Tribute to ʻAbdu'l-Bahá"), arrangements, art concept
- Tony Peluso – guitars on "Takin' It Easy" and "Sunrise", Buchla synthesizer on "Sunrise", backing vocals on "Takin' It Easy" and "One More Time", arrangements (for "Takin' It Easy", "One More Time", and "Sunrise")
- Marty Walsh – guitars on "Takin' It Easy" and "Forever Like the Rose"
- Larry Rolando – guitars (on "One More Time", "Midnight Blue", "You're the Love", "Breaking in a Brand New Love", and "Nobody Gets Over Lovin' You")
- Dan Fergueson – dobro on "Midnight Blue"
- Dennis Belfield – bass (except on "Takin' It Easy", "Midnight Blue", and "Forever Like the Rose")
- Dominic Genova – bass on "Takin' It Easy" and "Forever Like the Rose"
- David Parlota – bass on "Midnight Blue"
- Steven Olitzky – piano (on "Takin' It Easy", "One More Time", "You're the Love", "Nobody Gets Over Lovin' You", and "Forever Like the Rose")
- Tom Hensley – piano (on "One More Time", "You're the Love", "Breaking in a Brand New Love", "Magnolia Moon", and "Nobody Gets Over Loving You")
- Brian Whitcomb – piano on "Sunrise" and "Breaking in a Brand New Love"
- David Foster – piano on "Midnight Blue"
- Danny Deardroff – harmonica on "Midnight Blue"
- Ralph Humphrey – drums (on "Takin' It Easy", "One More Time", "You're the Love", "Magnolia Moon", and "Nobody Gets Over Lovin' You")
- Ron Krasinski – drums (on "Takin' It Easy", "You're the Love", "Nobody Gets Over Lovin' You", and "Forever Like the Rose")
- James Divisek – drums and Buchla programming on "Sunrise" and "Breaking in a Brand New Love"
- Jim Keltner – drums on "Midnight Blue"
- Bob Zimmitti – tympani on "Midnight Blue"
- Shaun Furlong – strings programming on "Sunrise"
- Don Menza – tenor sax on "Magnolia Moon"
- Alan Estes – vibraphone on "Nobody Gets Over Lovin' You"
- Manoochehr Sadeghi – santur and Persian chanting on "A Tribute to ʻAbdu'l-Bahá"
- Sean MacLeod and Bob Phillips – backing vocals on "Takin' It Easy"
- Tanya Tucker, Sherlie Matthews, Jim Gilstrap, and Venetta Fields – backing vocals on "Nobody Gets Over Lovin' You"
- Gary Sims – arrangement and backing vocals on "One More Time"
- Doug Strawn – arrangement and backing vocals on "One More Time"
- Gene Page – string arrangement for "You're the Love"
- Lee Holdridge – string arrangement for "Forever Like the Rose"

== Charts ==
Chart (1978)	Peak position
Canada RPM Top Albums	45
US Billboard Top LPs	78
