= Year of Sunday =

Studio album by Seals and Crofts
- Released: November 1971
- Studio: A&M (Hollywood, California); Morgan (London, UK)
- Genre: Folk rock
- Label: Warner Bros.
- Producer: Louie Shelton

Seals and Crofts chronology
Down Home (1970)	Year of Sunday (1971)	Summer Breeze (1972)

Professional ratings
Review scores
Source	Rating
Allmusic	3/5 stars

Year of Sunday is the third album by soft rock duo Seals and Crofts. It was released in 1971 on Warner Bros. Records and was their first record for a major label.

== Track listing ==
All songs written by Jim Seals and Dash Crofts unless otherwise indicated

Side One

1. "When I Meet Them" – 3:15
2. "'Cause You Love" (Jim Seals) – 3:22
3. "Antoinette" – 3:37
4. "High on a Mountain" (Bobby Lichtig, Seals) – 4:08
5. "Year of Sunday" – 5:48

Side Two

1. "Paper Airplanes" – 2:41
2. "Irish Linen" – 3:27
3. "Springfield Mill" (Seals, Vince Clark) – 3:05
4. "Ancient of the Old" – 3:25
5. "Sudan Village" – 4:08

== Charts ==
Chart (1971)	Peak position
US (Billboard 200)	133

== Personnel ==
- Jim Seals – guitar, fiddle, vocals
- Dash Crofts – mandolin, vocals (except on "High on a Mountain")
- Louie Shelton – guitar
- Larry Muhoberac – keyboards
- Bobby Lichtig – bass
- Russ Kunkel – drums
- Victor Feldman – percussion

Recorded at A&M Studios, Hollywood and Morgan Studios, London
