= One on One (soundtrack) =

Soundtrack album by Seals and Crofts
- Released: September 1977; December 12, 2008 (re-released)
- Genre: Soft rock
- Label: Warner Bros. Rhino (2008 Remastered Version)
- Producer: Louie Shelton

Seals and Crofts chronology
Sudan Village (1976)	One on One (soundtrack) (1977)	Takin' It Easy (1978)

One on One is the soundtrack album to the movie of the same title, One on One starring Robby Benson. The music was written entirely by Charles Fox, with lyrics by Paul Williams. Seals and Crofts provided the vocals. The single "My Fair Share (Love Theme from One on One)" reached #11 AC and #28 Pop in autumn 1977. In Canada the single was #27 on the Pop charts, #25 on the AC charts, and was also #182 in the Canadian Top 200 of 1977.

It was first released on CD in 2007 by Wounded Bird Records, and digitally by Rhino Records (another label of Warner Bros.) in 2008.

== Track listing ==
1. "My Fair Share" 2:48
2. "This Day Belongs to Me" 2:51
3. "Janet's Theme" 3:10
4. "John Wayne" 2:45
5. "Picnic" 2:18
6. "Flyin'" 2:32
7. "Reflections" 1:39
8. "Love Conquers All" 2:48
9. "It'll Be Alright" 2:17
10. "Hustle" 2:33
11. "Time Out" 3:14
12. "The Party" 2:22
13. "The Basketball Game" 1:45
14. "This Day Belongs to Me (Reprise)" 2:23

== Charts ==
Chart (1978)	Peak position
US Top LPs & Tape (Billboard)	118
