= Get Closer (Seals & Crofts album) =

Studio album by Seals and Crofts
- Released: May 1976
- Genre: Soft rock
- Label: Warner Bros.
- Producer: Louie Shelton

Seals and Crofts chronology
I'll Play for You (1975)	Get Closer (1976)	Sudan Village (1976)

Singles from Get Closer
- 1. "Get Closer" Released: April 1976; 2. "Goodbye Old Buddies" Released: 1976

Get Closer is Seals and Crofts's eighth studio album. The title cut made the top 10 on 2 charts in early 1976, reaching #6 in Pop, and #2 in Adult Contemporary. It would be their final top 10 pop hit. "Goodbye Old Buddies" reached #10 on the US AC chart as well and #8 on the Canadian AC chart.

The song "Get Closer" features the vocals of Carolyn Willis, who had been in the group Honey Cone.

"Sweet Green Fields" was sampled in the 1997 song "Put Your Hands Where My Eyes Could See" by Busta Rhymes. It was also sampled in 2002 by Syleena Johnson on "Tonight I'm Gonna Let Go" which was based on "Put Your Hands Where My Eyes Could See".

== Track listing ==
Side One

1. "Sweet Green Fields" (James Seals) 4:45
2. "Get Closer" (Seals, Dash Crofts, arrangement Gene Page) 3:57
3. "Red Long Ago" (Seals, Bob Gundry, Kelley McKinney) 5:25
4. "Goodbye Old Buddies" (Parker McGee) 2:50

Side Two

1. "Baby Blue" (Seals, Crofts) 3:20
2. "Million Dollar Horse" (Seals, Walter Heath) 3:45
3. "Don't Fail" (Seals) 3:50
4. "Passing Thing" (Seals, Crofts) 6:25

== Charts ==
Chart (1976)	Peak position
Australia (Kent Music Report)	67
Canada	25
US Top LPs & Tape (Billboard)	37

== Personnel ==
- James Seals – lead vocals (except on "Goodbye Old Buddies"), guitar
- Dash Crofts – lead vocals, mandolin
- Louis Shelton – guitar, production
- Ray Parker Jr. – guitar
- Lee Ritenour – guitar
- David Paich – keyboards, string arrangements on "Red Long Ago" and "Don't Fail"
- Joe Sample – electric piano
- David Hungate – bass guitar
- Wilton Felder – bass guitar
- Jeff Porcaro – drums
- Ed Greene – drums
- Milt Holland – tabla
- Jim Horn – alto sax
- Carolyn Willis – backing vocals, lead vocal on "Get Closer"
- Myrna Matthews – backing vocals
- Sherlie Matthews – backing vocals
- Carol Carmichael – backing vocals
- Donnie Shelton – backing vocals
