= Summer Breeze (Seals & Crofts album) =

Studio album by Seals and Crofts
- Released: September 9, 1972
- Studio: Sound Factory (Hollywood)
- Genres: Folk rock, soft rock
- Length: 39:11
- Label: Warner Bros.
- Producer: Louie Shelton

Seals and Crofts chronology
Year of Sunday (1971)	Summer Breeze (1972)	Diamond Girl (1973)

Singles from Summer Breeze
- 1. "Summer Breeze" Released: August 1972; 2. "Hummingbird" Released: January 1973

Professional ratings
Review scores
Source	Rating
Allmusic	4.5/5 stars

Summer Breeze is the fourth album by the American soft rock band Seals and Crofts, released in 1972 through Warner Bros. Records. It was a major commercial breakthrough for the group peaking at No. 7 on the Billboard Top LPs chart, their highest position on the chart. The title track was released as a single on August 31, 1972, peaking at No. 4 on the Easy Listening chart and No. 6 on the Hot 100. "Hummingbird" was the second single, climbing to No. 12 on the Easy Listening chart, No. 20 on the Hot 100, and No. 40 on the Canadian RPM Magazine chart. Summer Breeze finished second on Billboard's Top Pop Albums of 1973 list.

== Track listing ==
- All lyrics by Jim Seals, music by Jim Seals and Dash Crofts, except "Say", music and lyrics by Seals and Crofts.

Side One

1. "Hummingbird" – 4:35
2. "Funny Little Man" – 3:12
3. "Say" – 2:41
4. "Summer Breeze" – 3:24
5. "East of Ginger Trees" – 3:49

Side Two

1. "Fiddle in the Sky" – 3:32
2. "The Boy Down the Road" – 4:31
3. "The Euphrates" – 4:18
4. "Advance Guards" – 4:12
5. "Yellow Dirt" – 5:14
6. "Summer Breeze (2004 Philip Steir Remix)" – 4:30 (2004 remastered bonus track)

== Charts ==
Chart (1972–73)	Peak position
Australia (Kent Music Report)	70
Canada	6
US Top LPs & Tape (Billboard)	7

== Personnel ==
- Vocals, guitar, fiddle, saxophone: Jim Seals
- Vocals, electric piano, guitar, mandolin: Dash Crofts
- Backing vocals, guitar, bass: Louis Shelton
- Steel guitar: Red Rhodes
- Banjo: John Hartford
- Tambura, tabla: Milt Holland
- Bass guitar: Harvey Brooks, Robert Lichtig, Joe Osborn, Wilton Felder
- Piano: John Ford Coley, Larry Knechtel, Michael Lang, Clarence McDonald, Michael Omartian
- Drums: Jim Gordon, Jim Keltner, John Guerin, Russ Kunkel
- Congas: King Errisson
- Flutes: Jim Horn, Robert Lichtig
- Clarinet: Robert Lichtig
- Backing Vocals: Dee Higgins, Donnie Shelton
- String Arrangements: Marty Paich
