= Seals & Crofts (album) =

Seals and Crofts

Studio album by Seals and Crofts
- Released: December 1969
- Genre: Folk rock
- Label: TA Records
- Producer: Bob Alcivar

Seals and Crofts chronology
| Seals and Crofts (1969) | Down Home (1970) |

Professional ratings
Review scores
| Source | Rating |
|---|---|
| Allmusic | 3/5 stars |
| The Village Voice | C− |

Seals and Crofts is the debut album of pop/folk duo Seals and Crofts.

== Track listing ==
All songs written by Jim Seals unless otherwise indicated.

1. "See My Life"
2. "Sea of Consciousness"
3. "Seldom's Sister"
4. "Not Be Found"
5. "Birthday of My Thoughts"
6. "In Tune"
7. "'Cows of Gladness"
8. "Earth"
9. "Seven Valleys" (Jim Seals, Dash Crofts)
10. "Jekyll and Hyde"
11. "Ashes in the Snow"
12. "See My Life (Reprise)"

== Charts ==
| Chart (1970) | Peak position |
|---|---|
| Canada | 64 |

== Personnel ==
- Jim Seals – vocals, guitar
- Dash Crofts – vocals, mandolin
- Louie Shelton – bass
- Jim Gordon – drums
- Victor Feldman – percussion
- Bill Holman – orchestral arrangements
- Bill Holan and His Orchestra – orchestra

Technical

- Ann McClelland – assistant producer
- Rik Pekkonen – engineer
- Wayne Kimbell – art direction
- George Rodriguez – photography
