= Diamond Girl (album) =

Studio album by Seals and Crofts
- Released: April 1973
- Studio: Sound Factory (Hollywood)
- Genres: Folk rock, soft rock
- Length: 41:09
- Label: Warner Bros.
- Producer: Louie Shelton

Seals and Crofts chronology
Summer Breeze (1972)	Diamond Girl (1973)	Unborn Child (1974)

Singles from Diamond Girl
- 1. "Diamond Girl" Released: May 1973; 2. "We May Never Pass This Way (Again)" Released: September 1973

Professional ratings
Review scores
Source	Rating
Allmusic	4.5/5 stars
Creem	C−

Diamond Girl is the fifth studio album by pop/folk duo Seals and Crofts. It was released in 1973 on Warner Bros. Records.

== Background ==
The album contains a number of different musical styles and themes. "Nine Houses" is one of two intimate, religious songs, which the band would often reserve for after concert performances. "Ruby Jean and Billie Lee" is another, written for their spouses, Ruby Jean Anderson (Seals) and Billie Lee Day (Crofts). The first verse is sung by Seals, and the second by Crofts, with both singing the chorus. Their children (Lua Crofts and Joshua Seals) are mentioned in the chorus.

Diamond Girl peaked at #4 on the U.S. album charts. Its title track "Diamond Girl" reached #6 on the Billboard Hot 100 chart in the summer and #13 in Canada. The follow-up single "We May Never Pass This Way (Again)" attained the #21 position late in the year (#33 in Canada).

== Track listing ==
All songs written by Jim Seals and Dash Crofts, unless otherwise indicated.

Side one
No.	Title	Length
1.	"Diamond Girl"	4:12
2.	"Ruby Jean and Billie Lee"	4:09
3.	"Intone My Servant"	3:04
4.	"We May Never Pass This Way (Again)"	4:17
5.	"Nine Houses"	7:00

Side two
No.	Title	Writer(s)	Length
1.	"Standin' on a Mountain Top"	Seals	3:05
2.	"It's Gonna Come Down (on You)"		4:40
3.	"Jessica"		2:56
4.	"Dust on My Saddle"	Seals	3:16
5.	"Wisdom"		4:26

== Personnel ==
- Jim Seals – guitar, alto saxophone, vocals
- Dash Crofts – mandolins, vocals, Fender Rhodes electric piano
- Louie Shelton – guitar, producer
- David Paich – organ, piano
- Bobby Lichtig – bass, flute
- Wilton Felder – bass
- Jim Gordon – drums
- John Guerin – drums
- Harvey Mason – drums
- Jeff Porcaro – drums
- Bobbye Hall – percussion
- England Dan & John Ford Coley – backing vocals
- David Hassinger – engineer
- Steve Waldman – 2nd engineer
- Joseph Bogan – assistant engineer

== Charts ==
=== Weekly charts ===
Weekly chart performance for Diamond Girl
Chart (1973)	Peak position
Australian Albums (Kent Music Report)	48
Canada Top Albums/CDs (RPM)	8
US Billboard 200	4
US Top 100 Albums (Cash Box)	6
US The Album Chart (Record World)	6

=== Year-end charts ===
Year-end chart performance for Diamond Girl
Chart (1973)	Position
US Billboard 200	23
US Top 100 Albums (Cash Box)	3
