= We May Never Pass This Way (Again) =

Single by Seals and Crofts

from the album Diamond Girl
- B-side: "Jessica"
- Released: September 1973
- Genre: Soft rock
- Length: 4:15
- Label: Warner Bros.
- Songwriters: Jim Seals, Dash Crofts
- Producer: Louie Shelton

Seals and Crofts singles chronology
"Diamond Girl" (1973)	"We May Never Pass This Way (Again)" (1973)	"Unborn Child" (1974)

"We May Never Pass This Way (Again)" is a song by American soft rock duo Seals and Crofts, released as a single in 1973. It was the second single from their fifth studio album, Diamond Girl. The song reached No. 21 on the US Billboard Hot 100 and spent two weeks at number 18 on the Cash Box Top 100.

The song was a significantly greater hit on the Adult Contemporary chart, where it reached number two on both the American and Canadian charts.

== Chart performance ==
Chart (1973)	Peak position
Australia (Kent Music Report)	29
Canada RPM Adult Contemporary	2
Canada RPM Top Singles	33
US Billboard Easy Listening	2
US Cash Box Top 100	18
US Billboard Hot 100	21
