= The Champs =

American rock and roll band

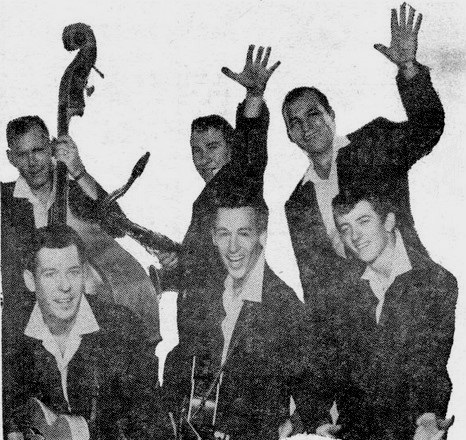
- The band in 1958

Background information
- Origin: Los Angeles, California, United States
- Genres: Rock and roll
- Years active: 1957–1965, 2020
- Label: Challenge

The Champs were an American rock and roll band, most famous for their Latin-tinged 1958 instrumental single "Tequila". The group took their name from that of Gene Autry's horse, Champion, and was formed by studio executives at Autry's Challenge Records to record a B-side for the Dave Burgess single "Train to Nowhere". The intended throwaway track became more famous than its A-side, as "Tequila" went to number one in just three weeks, and the band became the first group to go to the top spot with an instrumental that was their first release. The song was recorded at Gold Star Studios in fall 1957, and in 1959 won the Grammy Award for Best R&B Performance. It sold over one million copies, and was awarded a gold disc by the Recording Industry Association of America.

== History ==
=== Success with their 1958 song "Tequila" ===
"Tequila" was written by saxophonist Danny Flores, although he was credited as "Chuck Rio" because he was under contract to another record label (RPM Records) at the time. Flores, who was of Mexican heritage and died in September 2006, was known as the "Godfather of Latino rock". Flores' "dirty sax" and his low-voiced "Tequila" are the hallmarks of the song. Flores signed away the US rights to the song, but retained worldwide rights until his death.

The many cover versions of the tune include a jazz version by guitarist Wes Montgomery in 1966. It has also been recorded by rappers A.L.T. and XL Singleton. The Champs also had success with instrumentals such as "Limbo Rock" and "El Rancho Rock". In 1985, "Tequila" featured prominently in the film Pee Wee's Big Adventure. The Champs also recorded a sequel to "Tequila" entitled "Too Much Tequila".

=== 2020 band reunion ===
In 2020, group leader Burgess resurrected the Champs for a new album, Tequila Party, scheduled for November release. The LP contains 12 newly recorded tracks, including a "party" rendition of their signature hit plus seven new compositions.

== Band members ==
- Chuck Rio – saxophone, vocals (born Daniel Flores on July 11, 1929, Santa Paula, California, died on September 19, 2006, Huntington Beach, California)
- Dave Burgess – rhythm guitar ("Dave Dupree", born on December 3, 1934, Beverly Hills, California, died on October 19, 2025, Dover, Tennessee)
- Dale Norris – lead guitar (born Allan D. Norris on May 18, 1934, Springfield, Missouri, died on December 27, 2023, Carthage, Missouri)
- Buddy Bruce – lead guitar (born 1930, Missouri, died 2014, Tulsa, Oklahoma)
- Bob Morris – bass guitar (born on February 3, 1930, Hasty, Arkansas, died on December 3, 1981)
- Benjamin Van Norman – bass (born on July 19, 1928, Ann Arbor, Michigan, died on November 3, 1958, Buena Park, California in a car accident)
- Chuck Hills – keyboard bass (born Charles Hillier on May 01, 1940, Lake Charles, Louisiana)
- Joe Burnas – bass (born 1923, Chicago, died on April 12, 1999)
- Gene Alden – drums (born on February 14, 1931, South Dakota, died on August 21, 2002)
- Dean Beard – piano (born on August 31, 1935, Santa Anna, Texas, died on April 4, 1989, in Coleman, Texas)
- Jim Seals – saxophone (born on October 17, 1942, Sidney, Texas, died on June 6, 2022)
- Dash Crofts – drums (born on August 14, 1938, Cisco, Texas, died on March 25, 2026)

Dave "Snuffy" Smith played bass from late 1959 to 1960. Other members around this time were Jim Seals and Dash Crofts, with Johnny Meeks (originally of Gene Vincent and the Blue Caps) on lead guitar. Later band members included Glen Campbell, Jerry Cole, Chuck Downs (drums), Rich Grissom, Gary Nieland (drums), Jerry Puckett (guitar), Marvin Siders, and Leon Sanders. The last lineup of the band, in 1964, included Johnny Trombatore (who co-wrote some songs with Seals and Crofts), Maurice Marshall, bassist Curtis Paul, and Seals' replacement, Keith MacKendrick (who later stayed on saxophone when Seals returned).

In 1969, Jim Seals and Dash Crofts, who met as teenagers in Texas, formed the duo Seals and Crofts, attaining international acclaim for such Top 10 hits as "Summer Breeze" (1972), "Diamond Girl" (1973), and "Get Closer" (1976).

== Singles ==
Year	Titles (A-side, B-side) Both sides from same album except where indicated	Chart positions			Album
Year	Titles (A-side, B-side) Both sides from same album except where indicated	US	US R&B	UK	Album
1958	"Tequila" b/w "Train To Nowhere"	1	1	5	Go, Champs, Go!
1958	"El Rancho Rock"	30	10	—	Go, Champs, Go!
1958	"Midnighter"	94	—	—	Go, Champs, Go!
1958	"Chariot Rock" b/w "Subway"	59	—	—	Everybody's Rockin'
1958	"Turnpike" b/w "Rockin' Mary"	—	—	—	Everybody's Rockin'
1958	"Beatnik" b/w "Gone Train"	—	—	—	Non-album tracks
1959	"Caramba" b/w "Moonlight Bay"	—	—	—	Non-album tracks
1959	"Night Train" b/w "The Rattler"	—	—	—	Non-album tracks
1959	"Sky High" b/w "Double Eagle Rock"	—	—	—	Non-album tracks
1960	"Too Much Tequila" b/w "Twenty Thousand Leagues" (Non-album track)	30	—	49	Great Dance Hits
1960	"The Little Matador" b/w "Red Eye"	—	—	—	Non-album tracks
1960	"Alley Cat" b/w "Cocoanut Grove"	—	—	—	Non-album tracks
1960	"Tough Train" b/w "The Face"	—	—	—	Non-album tracks
1961	"Sombrero" b/w "The Shoddy Shoddy" (from Great Dance Hits)	—	—	—	Non-album tracks
1961	"Hokey Pokey" b/w "Jumping Bean" (Non-album track)	—	—	—	Great Dance Hits
1962	"Tequila Twist" /	99	—	—	Great Dance Hits
1962	"Limbo Rock"	40	—	—	Great Dance Hits
1962	"Experiment In Terror" b/w "La Cucaracha"	—	—	—	Non-album tracks
1962	"I've Just Seen Her" b/w "What A Country"	—	—	—	The Champs Play All-American
1962	"Limbo Dance" b/w "Latin Limbo"	97	—	—	Non-album tracks
1962	"That Did It" b/w "Varsity Rock"	—	—	—	Non-album tracks
1963	"Nik Nak" b/w "Shades"	—	—	—	Non-album tracks
1963	"Mr. Cool" b/w "3/4 Mash"	—	—	—	Non-album tracks
1963	"Cactus Juice" b/w "Roots"	—	—	—	Non-album tracks
1963	"San Juan" b/w "Jalisco"	—	—	—	Non-album tracks
1964	"Only The Young" b/w "Switzerland"	—	—	—	Non-album tracks
1964	"Kahlua" b/w "Fraternity Waltz"	—	—	—	Non-album tracks
1965	"Bright Lights, Big City" b/w "French 75"	—	—	—	Non-album tracks
1966	"Anna" b/w "Buckaroo"	—	—	—	Non-album tracks
1987	"Tequila" b/w "Pee Wee's Dance" (by Joseki Love)	—	—	82	Pee Wee's Big Adventure (Soundtrack)

== See also ==
- Chicano rock
