= Bloody Kisses =

- Original Release (1993)

Studio album by Type O Negative
- Released: August 17, 1993
- Recorded: February–March 1993
- Studios: Systems Two, Brooklyn
- Genres: Gothic metal; doom metal; alternative metal
- Length: 73:28
- Label: Roadrunner
- Producers: Peter Steele, Josh Silver

Type O Negative chronology
The Origin of the Feces (1992)	Bloody Kisses (1993)	October Rust (1996)

Singles from Bloody Kisses
- 1. "Christian Woman" Released: February 1994

Alternate Cover Art
- Limited Edition Digipak Reissue (1994)

Bloody Kisses is the third studio album by the American gothic metal band Type O Negative and the last recording with their original lineup, as drummer Sal Abruscato left the group in late 1993 to join labelmates Life of Agony. The album includes two of their best known songs, "Christian Woman" and "Black No. 1 (Little Miss Scare-All)", both of which earned the band a considerable cult following. The album further established recurring motifs of the band's music, such as including cover songs recorded in their own unique style, sample-heavy soundscape interludes and lyrics replete with dry, satirical humor.

Bloody Kisses is notable for being the first album released on Roadrunner Records to be certified Gold by the Recording Industry Association of America (RIAA), in November 1995. It was certified Platinum by the RIAA in December 2000.

== Music and lyrics ==
The liner notes for the album includes the following dedication from Steele:

This entire opus is respectfully dedicated to all those who have loved unconditionally only to have their hearts unanesthetically ripped out: Base not your joy upon the deeds of others, for what is given can be taken away. No hope = no fear. — Peter

Considered a classic in the gothic metal genre, Bloody Kisses is "saturated with complex patterns of sound" layered with Peter Steele's trademark baritone vocals and lyrics relating to topics such as sex, religion, image, and death.

According to Decibel, Bloody Kisses "featured infectious doom-pop epics ("Black No. 1 (Little Miss Scare-All)", "Christian Woman"), sarcastic hardcore screeds ("Kill All the White People", "We Hate Everyone")" and bizarre noise interludes ("Fay Wray Come Out and Play", "Dark Side of the Womb", "3.0.I.F.")".

"Black No. 1 (Little Miss Scare-All)" is "a sarcastic ode to goth girls (and their trademark, black hair dye) based on a narcissistic ex-girlfriend of singer/songwriter Peter Steele".

Bloody Kisses includes a cover of the classic Seals & Crofts' track, "Summer Breeze". Type O Negative's original recording of the song included alternate lyrics, written by Peter Steele, and was retitled "Summer Girl". However, original songwriters Seals & Crofts, found Steele's "Summer Girl" lyrics distasteful and the band was forced to re-record the vocals and remix the track with the song's original lyrics and title intact.

When played in its entirety, top to bottom, the album's songs and noise interludes constitute one seamless composition. The band would continue this tradition on the World Coming Down LP released in 1999.

The album features additional vocal performances from close friends of the band, including Keith Caputo, Joey Zampella and Alan Robert of fellow Brooklyn-based alt-metal band Life of Agony, who are credited as "Erasmus High School Boys Special Ed." in the album's liner notes.

Founding member, drummer Sal Abruscato, would leave the band shortly after the album's completion due to Peter Steele's reluctance to commit to touring. Abruscato would join Life of Agony full-time after performing on the band's debut album, River Runs Red, recorded later that same year. River Runs Red was produced and mixed by Type O Negative keyboardist/producer Josh Silver, and was also released on Roadrunner Records in 1993. Both albums became very successful releases for the record label, and Life of Agony, with Abruscato, would open for Type O Negative during the initial Bloody Kisses tour of '93–'94.

The album artwork depicts several locations of Green-Wood Cemetery, Brooklyn, photographed by John Wadsworth.

== Critical reception ==
Professional ratings
Review scores
Source	Rating
AllMusic	4.5/5 stars
Collector's Guide to Heavy Metal	7/10
Kerrang!	(1993) (2011)
Pitchfork	8.7/10
Record Collector	3/5 stars
Rock Hard	10/10
Rolling Stone	2/5 stars
Terrorizer	8.5/10

Bloody Kisses received mostly positive reviews. Steve Huey of AllMusic gave the album a 4.5 out of 5 and wrote that "though it sounds like a funeral, Bloody Kisses' airy melodicism and '90s-style irony actually breathed new life into the flagging goth metal genre". Rock Hard gave the album a 10 out of 10 rating.

=== Accolades ===
In 2005, Bloody Kisses was ranked number 365 in Rock Hard's book of The 500 Greatest Rock & Metal Albums of All Time. Loudwire called Bloody Kisses the best album of 1993, in addition to ranking it at number 42 on its Top 90 Hard Rock and Heavy Metal Albums of the 90s. Rolling Stone placed Bloody Kisses at number 53 on its Top 100 Greatest Heavy Metal Albums of All Time list, citing memorable songs such as "Christian Woman", "Bloody Kisses (A Death in the Family)", their cover version of "Summer Breeze", and "Black No. 1". The latter was cited by the author J. D. Considine as the band's signature song.

== Track listings ==
All music and lyrics written by Peter Steele unless otherwise noted.

Bloody Kisses (1993 original release)
No.	Title	Length
1.	"Machine Screw"	0:41
2.	"Christian Woman": A) "Body of Christ (Corpus Christi)"; B) "To Love God"; C) "J.C. Looks Like Me"	8:58: 4:21; 2:51; 1:46
3.	"Black No. 1 (Little Miss Scare-All)"	11:15
4.	"Fay Wray Come Out and Play"	1:03
5.	"Kill All the White People"	3:24
6.	"Summer Breeze" (Seals & Crofts cover)	4:49
7.	"Set Me on Fire"	3:29
8.	"Dark Side of the Womb"	0:28
9.	"We Hate Everyone"	6:51
10.	"Bloody Kisses (A Death in the Family)"	10:56
11.	"3.0.I.F."	2:06
12.	"Too Late: Frozen"	7:50
13.	"Blood & Fire"	5:32
14.	"Can't Lose You"	6:06
Total length:		1:13:28

=== Bloody Kisses Digipak Edition (1994) ===
On May 17, 1994, Roadrunner Records reissued Bloody Kisses as a limited edition tri-fold digipak that featured alternate cover art. This digipak reissue also featured an alternate track listing. The new track listing revised the running order, removed all of the soundscape interludes, and removed the two "hardcore" songs ("Kill All The White People" and "We Hate Everyone") replacing them with a previously unreleased, over eight minute long, slow and very "gothic" sounding track titled "Suspended In Dusk". The intro track "Machine Screw" and the first four seconds of the song "Christian Woman" were also removed on this release, omitting Peter Steele's spoken intro to the track ("Forgive her..."). This slightly edited version of "Christian Woman" is exclusive to this digipak reissue. The digipak re-release and its aforementioned changes, were done specifically at the request of bassist/singer/songwriter, Peter Steele.

No.	Title	Length
1.	"Christian Woman"	8:54
2.	"Bloody Kisses (A Death in the Family)"	10:56
3.	"Too Late: Frozen"	7:51
4.	"Blood & Fire"	5:33
5.	"Can't Lose You"	6:06
6.	"Summer Breeze" (Seals & Crofts cover)	4:49
7.	"Set Me on Fire"	3:30
8.	"Suspended in Dusk"	8:37
9.	"Black No.1 (Little Miss Scare-All)"	11:16
Total length:		1:07:32

In an interview for the liner notes of the remastered, "Top Shelf Edition" reissue of Bloody Kisses in 2009, Steele said that although he hated ripping off the public (by releasing two versions of the album), he felt it was his opportunity to fix what he believed was a musical mistake. Guitarist Kenny Hickey, who was not a fan of "Suspended In Dusk", noted that the digipak version of the album was Steele trying to move into the vision of the band fully realized on 1996's "October Rust".

Producer and keyboardist, Josh Silver had stronger feelings on the digipak version of Bloody Kisses, stating, "the digipak sucks". Silver went on to say that part of what makes Type O Negative great is the, "eclectic insanity" - going from songs like 'Black No. 1' to 'Kill All The White People' and that brilliance was a "happy accident". Silver noted that Peter, "doesn’t get it half the time. Which is fine. He doesn’t have to get it — he just has to do it. But he wanted continuity, so they put out the digipak."

"Summer Breeze" was initially recorded by the band as "Summer Girl" with lyrics parodying the original, but "Summer Breeze" songwriters Seals and Croft objected to the lyrical changes and the song was re-recorded with the original lyrics before the album's official release date. "Summer Girl" remains unreleased commercially but it did appear on a Roadrunner Records 5-track promotional CD/cassette. Issued simply as "?", with no mention of the artist, this release was part of a Roadrunner Records contest promoting the upcoming release of Bloody Kisses. The first twenty-five fans who correctly identified the artist received "a special gift that only this artist could provide." "Summer Girl" has since circulated online.

Along with the new cover art, this digipak release also contained alternate internal artwork giving the layout more of a "gothic" look. The new packaging also included an amended booklet that reflected the re-ordering and changing of the tracks. Another change was found in the album's liner notes which contained the title of and lyrics for "Summer Girl" instead of "Summer Breeze". The parody lyrics of "Summer Girl" were included such as, "Kenny Hickey lying on the sidewalk, Devil music from the house next door". Josh Silver said the misprint was a mistake by Roadrunner Records. The recorded song is unchanged. The standard release of the album was pressed with the original "Summer Breeze" lyrics and title in the liner notes.

=== Bloody Kisses - The Top Shelf Edition (2009 remastered & expanded reissue) ===
On May 5, 2009, Roadrunner Records released Bloody Kisses - The Top Shelf Edition, a remastered and expanded reissue. This version features the original album’s first-ever remaster—handled in January 2009 by Grammy-winning engineer George Marino, who also mastered the original release—alongside a bonus CD of rarities and B-sides. The package is rounded out by expanded liner notes, additional photos, and an exclusive new interview with the band discussing the album's creation and enduring legacy.

Disc one
No.	Title	Length
1.	"Machine Screw"	0:40
2.	"Christian Woman"	8:58
3.	"Black No. 1 (Little Miss Scare-All)"	11:15
4.	"Fay Wray Come Out and Play"	1:03
5.	"Kill All the White People"	3:24
6.	"Summer Breeze" (Seals & Crofts cover)	4:49
7.	"Set Me on Fire"	3:30
8.	"Dark Side of the Womb"	0:28
9.	"We Hate Everyone"	6:52
10.	"Bloody Kisses (A Death in the Family)"	10:56
11.	"3.0.I.F."	2:06
12.	"Too Late: Frozen"	7:51
13.	"Blood & Fire"	5:33
14.	"Can't Lose You"	6:07
Total length:		1:13:32

Disc two
No.	Title	Length
1.	"Suspended In Dusk"	8:40
2.	"Black Sabbath" (Black Sabbath cover)	7:52
3.	"Black Sabbath (From the Satanic Perspective)"	7:48
4.	"Christian Woman" (Edit)	4:28
5.	"Christian Woman" (Butt-Kissing, Sell-Out Version)	4:28
6.	"Black No. 1" (Edit)	4:39
7.	"Blood & Fire" (Out Of The Ashes Mix)	4:38
8.	"Summer Breeze" (Rick Rubin Mix)	4:57
Total length:		47:31

=== Bloody Kisses: Suspended In Dusk - 30th Anniversary Version (2024 reissue of "The Top Shelf Edition") ===
To commemorate the album's 30th anniversary, Roadrunner Records re-issued "The Top Shelf Edition" of Bloody Kisses on March 29, 2024. Titled Bloody Kisses: Suspended In Dusk - 30th Anniversary Version, this release features the remastered audio and bonus content from 2009's "Top Shelf Edition" with the exception of the song, "Christian Woman (Butt-Kissing, Sell-Out Version)" which is not included on this release.

Early pressings of this re-issue incorrectly note eight tracks on Disc 2 with "Christian Woman (Butt-Kissing, Sell-Out Version)" listed as Track 5. These misprints were eventually fixed and later pressings correctly list seven tracks on Disc 2.

Disc one
No.	Title	Length
1.	"Machine Screw"	0:40
2.	"Christian Woman"	8:58
3.	"Black No. 1 (Little Miss Scare-All)"	11:15
4.	"Fay Wray Come Out and Play"	1:03
5.	"Kill All the White People"	3:24
6.	"Summer Breeze" (Seals & Crofts cover)	4:49
7.	"Set Me on Fire"	3:30
8.	"Dark Side of the Womb"	0:28
9.	"We Hate Everyone"	6:52
10.	"Bloody Kisses (A Death in the Family)"	10:56
11.	"3.0.I.F."	2:06
12.	"Too Late: Frozen"	7:51
13.	"Blood & Fire"	5:33
14.	"Can't Lose You"	6:07
Total length:		1:13:32

Disc two
No.	Title	Length
1.	"Suspended In Dusk"	8:40
2.	"Black Sabbath" (Black Sabbath cover)	7:52
3.	"Black Sabbath (From the Satanic Perspective)"	7:48
4.	"Christian Woman" (Edit)	4:28
5.	"Black No. 1" (Edit)	4:39
6.	"Blood & Fire" (Out Of The Ashes Mix)	4:38
7.	"Summer Breeze" (Rick Rubin Mix)	4:57
Total length:		43:03

== Personnel ==
=== Type O Negative ===
- Peter Steele – lead vocals, bass guitar
- Kenny Hickey – guitars, backing vocals, co-lead vocals on "Black No. 1 (Little Miss Scare All)" and "We Hate Everyone"
- Josh Silver – keyboards, synthesizers, backing vocals
- Sal Abruscato – drums

=== Additional personnel ===
- Paul Bento – sitar, tamboura
- The Bensonhoist Lesbian Choir – additional vocal performance
- Erasmus High School Boys Special Ed. – additional vocal performance
- Bonnie Weiss, Karen Rose, Debbie Alter, Chris Zamp, & Life Of Agony (Alan Robert, Joey Zampella, Keith Caputo, & Mike Palmeri) – additional vocal performance
- Brooklyn Philharmonic Orchestra (Verdigris Phlogiston conducting)

=== Production credits ===
- Produced by Peter Steele/Josh Silver
- Recorded at Systems Two, Brooklyn, NY
- Additional Recording at Sty In The Sky, Brooklyn, NY
- Mastered by George Marino at Sterling Sound, NYC
- John Wadsworth – photography
- Jeff Kitts – portrait photography

=== Bloody Kisses – The Top Shelf Edition (2009) reissue credits ===
- Re-issue producer – Monte Connor
- Project Coordinator – Steven Hartong
- Re-mastered by George Marino at Sterling Sound, NYC, January 2009
- Liner notes – J. Bennett
- Design – Mr. Scott Design
- Additional photography – John Wadsworth and Joseph Cullice

== Charts ==
=== Album ===
1990s chart performance for Bloody Kisses
Year	Chart	Position
1993	German Albums Chart	60
1995	US Billboard 200	166

2024 chart performance for Bloody Kisses
Chart (2024)	Peak position
Austrian Albums (Ö3 Austria)	35
Croatian International Albums (HDU)	13
German Albums (Offizielle Top 100)	29
Hungarian Albums (MAHASZ)	27
Portuguese Albums (AFP)	108
