= Down Home (Seals & Crofts album) =

Studio album by Seals and Crofts
- Released: September 1970
- Genre: Folk rock
- Length: 35:23
- Label: TA Records
- Producer: John Simon

Seals and Crofts chronology
Seals and Crofts (1969)	Down Home (1970)	Year of Sunday (1971)

Professional ratings
Review scores
Source	Rating
Allmusic	2/5 stars

Down Home is the second studio album by pop-folk duo Seals and Crofts, released in 1970.

== Track listing ==
All songs written by Jim Seals and Dash Crofts unless otherwise noted.

=== Side one ===
1. "Ridin' Thumb" - 3:50
2. "Hand-Me-Down Shoe" - 3:28
3. "Purple Hand" - 2:36
4. "Robin" - 1:55
5. "Hollow Reed" - 3:31

=== Side two ===
1. "Gabriel Go On Home" - 3:54
2. "Tin Town" - 3:13
3. "Today" - 3:39
4. "Cotton Mouth" - 3:42
5. "Granny Will Your Dog Bite?" (Traditional, arranged by Seals) - 0:40
6. "Leave" (Seals, John Trombatore) - 4:55
7. "See My Life (Reprise)" [secret track] (Seals) - 0:25

== Charts ==
Chart (1970)	Peak position
Canada	74

== Personnel ==
- Jim Seals – vocals, acoustic guitar, violin
- Dash Crofts – vocals, mandolin
- John Hall – electric guitar
- John Simon – piano, producer
- Paul Harris – organ
- Eddie Rich – bass (A1, B2, B6)
- Harvey Brooks – bass (A3, A5, B1, B4)
- Jim Rolleston – bass (A2, A4, B3, B5)
- Greg Thomas – drums
- Mark Harman, Steve Barncard, Tony May – engineers
- Wayne Kimbell – album design
- Richard Edlund – cover photograph
- Hillary Herbst – liner photograph
