= Unborn Child =

Studio album by Seals and Crofts
- Released: February 8, 1974
- Recorded: The Sound Factory, Los Angeles
- Genre: Soft rock
- Length: 38:06
- Label: Warner Bros.
- Producer: Louie Shelton

Seals and Crofts chronology
Diamond Girl (1973)	Unborn Child (1974)	I'll Play for You (1975)

Professional ratings
Review scores
Source	Rating
AllMusic	2/5 stars
Christgau's Record Guide	D−

Unborn Child is the sixth studio album by American music duo Seals and Crofts, released on February 8, 1974 by Warner Bros. Records. It features two singles, "Unborn Child" and "The King of Nothing", which reached number 66 and number 60 on the Billboard Hot 100 respectively. The title track reached number 63 in Canada. Upon release, the album caused controversy for its anti-abortion message.

== Album conception ==
The project originated when Lana Bogan, wife of recording engineer Joseph Bogan, watched a TV documentary on abortion and was inspired to write a poem from the perspective of an aborted fetus. While Seals and Crofts were working on their new album, Bogan approached Seals with the poem. She asked him to put the poem to music, which became the lead single "Unborn Child."

Seals and Crofts were followers of the Baháʼí Faith, a religion founded in the 19th-century which teaches that life begins at conception.

After listening to the full album, Seals and Crofts named it after the lead single because they decided that it best represented the concept of the album.

According to Crofts, Warner Bros. warned them not to release the album, because the subject of abortion was highly controversial. The duo insisted that the message of "Unborn Child" was universal, and Crofts stated that they made the record "to save lives."

== Album reception ==
Despite Warner's warnings, the album was released in February 1974 to great controversy. The title track garnered backlash and was banned from some radio stations because of its anti-abortion stance. Unborn Child hurt the duo's popularity and was criticized by music critics. The controversy lowered the profile of Seals and Crofts and slowed down their music career.

According to Bill DeYoung, the duo crossed the thin line that separated their music from the Baháʼí Faith, and abortion-rights advocates boycotted the record and the duo's concerts. For the album, Seals and Crofts won the "Keep Her in Her Place" award from the National Organization for Women (tying with Paul Anka for his recording of "(You're) Having My Baby") during its "annual putdown of male chauvinism" in the media on Women's Equality Day.

However, it did receive a mostly positive review from Noel Coppage, who, in a July 1974 issue of what was then known as Stereo Review described the song "Windflowers" as "truly beautiful, one of the most dazzling opening songs I've heard on an album in a long time," with "two-part harmonies that soar above inspired and single-minded runs on Crofts' mandolin and unbelievably clean and understanding strums on Seals' acoustic guitar, backed by some restrained and brilliant strums on Louis Shelton's electric guitar." Of the title cut, he wrote that its "message is anti-abortion propaganda, pure and simple, but it is delivered gently and poetically inside a layered, meaty melody–and hardworking liberals like me can like the song while disagreeing with the tract it could be prosaically reduced to."

== Track listing ==
All songs written by James Seals and Dash Crofts, except where indicated.

Side One

1. "Prelude" (:40) (David Paich)
2. "Windflowers" (3:07) (James Seals, Dan Seals)
3. "Desert People" (3:31)
4. "Unborn Child" (3:55) (Seals, Lana Bogan)
5. "The Story of Her Love" (3:30)
6. "Dance by the Light of the Moon" (4:47)

Side Two

1. "Rachel" (:58)
2. "King of Nothing" (3:16) (Seals)
3. "29 Years from Texas" (3:14)
4. "Ledges" (3:08)
5. "Follow Me" (3:44)
6. "Big Mac" (4:16)

== Charts ==
Chart (1974)	Peak position
Australia (Kent Music Report)	37
Canada	18
US Top LPs & Tape (Billboard)	14

== Personnel ==
- Jim Seals – vocals (backing only on "The Story of Her Love" and "King of Nothing"), acoustic guitar, spoken word on "Windflowers"
- Dash Crofts – vocals, mandolin
- Louis Shelton – electric guitar
- Buddy Emmons – steel guitar
- David Paich – keyboards, string arrangements, horn arrangements
- David Hungate – bass
- Jeff Porcaro – drums
- Bobbye Porter – percussion
