= Get Closer (song) =

Single by Seals and Crofts featuring Carolyn Willis

from the album Get Closer
- B-side: "Don't Fail"
- Released: April 1976
- Genre: Blue-eyed soul
- Length: 3:57
- Label: Warner Bros. Records
- Songwriters: Jim Seals, Dash Crofts
- Producer: Louie Shelton

Seals and Crofts featuring Carolyn Willis singles chronology
"Baby I'll Give It to You" (1976)	"Get Closer" (1976)	"Goodbye Old Buddies" (1977)

"Get Closer" is a song by American soft rock duo Seals and Crofts, released as a single in 1976. It is the title track of their eighth studio album, Get Closer and reached No. 6 on the Billboard Hot 100 and No. 2 on the Adult Contemporary chart. Billboard ranked it as the No. 16 song of 1976.

In Canada, the song reached No. 19 on the pop singles chart. On the Adult Contemporary chart it was a major hit, reaching No. 1.

"Get Closer" features vocals by former Honey Cone member Carolyn Willis. In 2004, the duo released a new recording of it on their final album, Traces. This version features vocals by their daughters, Juliet Seals Crossley and Lua Crofts.

Jim Seals' brother England Dan had a top 10 song at the same time with "Nights Are Forever Without You".

== Chart performance ==
=== Weekly charts ===
Chart (1976)	Peak position
Australia (Kent Music Report)	77
Canada RPM Top Singles	19
Canada RPM Adult Contemporary	1
U.S. Billboard Hot 100	6
U.S. Billboard Easy Listening	2
U.S. Cash Box Top 100	7

=== Year-end charts ===
Chart (1976)	Rank
Canada RPM Top Singles	152
U.S. Billboard Hot 100	16
U.S. Billboard Easy Listening	32
