= I'll Play for You =

I'll Play For You

Studio album by Seals and Crofts
- Released: March 1975
- Genre: Soft rock
- Label: Warner Bros.
- Producer: Louie Shelton

Seals and Crofts chronology
Unborn Child (1974)	I'll Play For You (1975)	Get Closer (1976)

I'll Play For You is Seals & Crofts' seventh studio album. The title cut reached #18 on the U.S. Billboard Hot 100 and #4 on the Adult Contemporary charts in the summer of 1975. It was equally successful in Canada (Pop #28, AC #2). It also charted in New Zealand (#30). "Castles in the Sand" also charted in the U.S. and Canada, peaking at #21 U.S. AC, and #27 Can Pop.

== Track listing ==
All songs written by James Seals and Dash Crofts, except where noted.

Side one
No.	Title	Writer(s)	Length
1.	"I'll Play for You"		4:04
2.	"Golden Rainbow"	Seals; Crofts; Bobby Lichtig; Jim Varley; Roger Johnson	4:29
3.	"Castles in the Sand"		4:05
4.	"Blue Bonnet Nation"		3:49
5.	"Ugly City"		3:31

Side two
No.	Title	Length
1.	"Wayland the Rabbit"	6:00
2.	"Freaks Fret"	2:59
3.	"Truth Is But a Woman"	3:04
4.	"Fire and Vengeance"	4:26

== Charts ==
Chart (1975)	Peak position
Australia (Kent Music Report)	55
Canada	31
US Top LPs & Tape (Billboard)	30

== Personnel ==
Musicians

- Jim Seals – vocals (except on "Golden Rainbow"), guitar, banjo
- Dash Crofts – vocals (except on "Wayland the Rabbit"), acoustic and electric mandolins, mandola on "Castles in the Sand"
- Louie Shelton – guitar, banjo
- Ovid Stevens – slide guitar
- Jack Lenz – keyboards (including ARP synthesizer on "Fire and Vengeance"), flute on "I'll Play for You"
- David Paich – keyboards
- Wilton Felder – bass (except on "I'll Play for You" and "Castles in the Sand")
- Mike Porcaro – bass on "I'll Play for You" and "Castles in the Sand"
- Ed Greene – drums (except on "I'll Play for You" and "Golden Rainbow")
- Jim Varley – drums on "I'll Play for You"
- Jeff Porcaro – drums on "Golden Rainbow"
- Antoine Dearborn – percussion
- Gene Cipriano, Bob Crosby, Jim Horn, Steve Leeds, and Henry Sigismonti – reeds
- Larry Ford, Paul Hubinon, Ron King, and Bobby Shew – trumpet
- Dick Hyde, John Leys, and Lew McCreary – trombone

Production

- Louie Shelton – producer
- Joe Bogan and Tom Knox – engineers
- Marcus Joseph – 2nd engineer
- Ivan Nagy – photography
- Robert Lockart – art direction and design
