= You're the Love =

Single by Seals and Crofts

from the album Takin' It Easy
- B-side: "Midnight Blue"
- Released: April 1978
- Genre: Soft rock, disco
- Label: Warner Bros. Records
- Songwriters: David Batteau, Louie Shelton
- Producer: Louie Shelton

Seals and Crofts singles chronology
"My Fair Share" (1977)	"You're the Love" (1978)	"Takin' It Easy" (1978)

"You're the Love" is a 1978 song recorded by Seals and Crofts. The song reached number 18 on the U.S. Billboard Hot 100, and in Canada, it spent two weeks at number eight. The song was the act's final Top 40 hit in both nations.

It was a bigger Adult Contemporary hit, reaching number five in Canada, and number two in the U.S.

== Chart performance ==
=== Weekly charts ===
Chart (1978)	Peak position
Canadian RPM Top Singles	8
Canadian RPM Adult Contemporary	5
U.S. Billboard Hot 100	18
U.S. Billboard Adult Contemporary	2

=== Year-end charts ===
Chart (1978)	Rank
Canada	88
U.S. Billboard Hot 100	122
