= Sidney High School =

Sidney High School may refer to:

- Sidney High School (Iowa) in Sidney, Iowa
- Sidney High School (Nebraska) in Sidney, Nebraska
- Sidney High School (Montana) in Sidney, Montana
- Sidney High School (New York) in Sidney, New York
- Sidney High School (Texas) in Sidney, Texas
- Sidney High School (Ohio) in Sidney, Ohio
