= Sidney Independent School District =

School district in Texas

Address
- 4100 Highway 1689 Sidney, Texas, 76474; United States
- Coordinates: 31°56′45.8″N 98°44′13.6″W

District information
- Type: Public
- Grades: PK–12
- Schools: 1
- NCES District ID: 4840170

Students and staff
- Students: 106 (2025–2026)
- Teachers: 14.19 (on an FTE basis) (2025–2026)
- Staff: 10.38 (on an FTE basis) (2025–2026)
- Student–teacher ratio: 7.47 (2025–2026)

Other information
- Website: www.sidney.esc14.net

Sidney Independent School District is a public school district based in the community of Sidney, Texas, United States.

The district has one school that serves students in prekindergarten through grade 12.

== Academic achievement ==
In 2009, the school district was rated "academically acceptable" by the Texas Education Agency.

== Athletics ==
Sidney High School athletics include six-man football, basketball, golf, tennis, track and field, cross-country running, and powerlifting. Junior high athletics include six-man football, cross-country running, track and field, and basketball.

== See also ==
- List of school districts in Texas
- List of high schools in Texas
