= One on One (1977 film) =

1977 drama film directed by Lamont Johnson

- Promotional poster
- Directed by: Lamont Johnson
- Written by: Robby Benson; Jerry Segal
- Produced by: Martin Hornstein
- Starring: Robby Benson; Annette O'Toole; G. D. Spradlin
- Cinematography: Donald M. Morgan
- Edited by: Robbe Roberts
- Music by: Charles Fox
- Distributed by: Warner Bros. Pictures
- Release date: June 28, 1977 (Fort Collins, Colorado)
- Running time: 98 minutes
- Country: United States
- Language: English
- Budget: $2 million
- Box office: $20 million

One on One is a 1977 American sports drama film starring Robby Benson and Annette O'Toole. It was written by Benson (then 21) and his father Jerry Segal. It was directed by Lamont Johnson and features a soundtrack performed by Seals and Crofts.

== Plot ==
Henry Steele, a naive high school basketball star from a small town in Colorado, wins a college scholarship to Western University in Los Angeles. Talented but with a tendency to improvise, Henry must overcome not only a cultural transition, but also adopt to the team's win-at-all-costs philosophy from his coach, which includes a strict system fraught with corruption. On the academic side, Henry is assigned to Janet Hays, a senior tutor, who initially disdains him, but eventually falls for him. Henry navigates through seduction from an older woman, bribing a police officer and brutal team practices. Henry is given an upper by a teammate and performs erratically on the court. Henry's lack of success on the court results in his coach pressuring him to give up the four-year scholarship. Henry refuses, whereupon the coach not only benches Henry but subjects him to unfair treatment and discipline in practice designed to make him quit. Janet continues to help Henry with his class work as their romance blossoms.

With the team's undefeated record in jeopardy, a teammate's injury results in Henry being sent into a game by the coach, instructed not to shoot the ball. Defying orders, Henry leads the team's comeback, makes the game-winning shot and is carried off the court on other players' shoulders. Back in the coach's good graces, he is assured his future at the school is no longer at risk, but Henry bluntly informs the coach exactly what he can do with his scholarship, as Henry believes he can play for any college.

== Cast ==
- Robby Benson as Henry Steele
- Annette O'Toole as Janet Hays
- G. D. Spradlin as Coach Moreland Smith
- Lamont Johnson as Barry Brunz
- Melanie Griffith as The Hitchhiker
- Hector Morales as Gonzales
- Gail Strickland as B.J. Rudolph
- Cory Faucher as Tom
- Charles Fleischer as High School Student

The film's director, Lamont Johnson, appears briefly as an alumni sponsor, part of a sub-plot regarding a win-at-all-costs corruption in the school's athletic programs.

== Production ==
The film was shot in 1976–77, primarily at Highland High school in Ault, Colorado, and at various locations on the campus of Colorado State University in Fort Collins. The working title was Catch a Falling Star. Despite preview audiences and many critics comparing the film to Rocky, that movie had not yet been filmed, let alone released, when One on One was being shot. Many scenes were filmed in Eugene, Oregon, at MacArthur Court and not mentioned in ending credits.

== Reception ==
The film has an 88% 'Fresh' rating on Rotten Tomatoes, citing 'generally favorable and positive reviews.

Roger Ebert gave the film three stars out of four and wrote that it was "funny and touching and makes you feel good." Vincent Canby of The New York Times stated that despite how predictable the film was, "predictability has the effect of enriching our interest as we wait to see not what will happen but how it's brought about. A lot of the success of the 'how' in 'One on One' has to do with the performance by writer-actor Benson, whose clean-cut naïveté masks a surprising moral strength, which, even if it's not very common, is something we'd all like to believe in." Charles Champlin of the Los Angeles Times declared that "the customers who liked 'Rocky' will find a whole lot to like in the film ... It is brisk, pointed, very funny and greatly engaging." Joseph McBride of Variety called it "a trite and disappointing little film" that "follows the 'Rocky' formula about the underdog-turned-hero but fails to ignite the emotions." Gene Siskel of the Chicago Tribune gave the film three stars out of four and praised "good performances in a well-directed script. We end up caring about Henry while the film tells us a lot about college sports." Gary Arnold of The Washington Post called the film "a wobbly attempt at junior division 'Rocky,'" with "fitfully appealing interludes" but "Whenever the mood shifts toward True Romance or pathos, the movie begins to disintegrate." Clyde Jeavons of The Monthly Film Bulletin wrote that the screenwriters "take the easy way out, opting for the old Hollywood winning-through-against-all-odds formula which makes their sporting hero's final rejection of his mentor-cum-tormentor both irrelevant and gratuitous and not in the least the 'surprise' ending that was intended." TV Guide says- 'ONE ON ONE is an earnest, mostly believable study of the psychological struggle that can occur between player and coach. Handling the ball as well as he does his lines, Benson is convincing both as a basketball player and as a young man undergoing emotional turmoil'.

== Soundtrack ==
The music was written by Charles Fox, with lyrics by Paul Williams. Seals and Crofts provided the vocals.

The track "My Fair Share" reached #28 on the Billboard Hot 100 on 19 November 1977 and was #182 in the Canadian Top 200 of 1977.

== See also ==
- List of basketball films
