= G. D. Spradlin =

American actor, attorney, and businessman (1920–2011)

- Born: Gervase Duan Spradlin; August 31, 1920; Pauls Valley, Oklahoma, U.S.
- Died: July 24, 2011 (aged 90); San Luis Obispo, California, U.S.
- Education: University of Oklahoma
- Occupation: Actor
- Years active: 1964–1999
- Political party: Independent
- Spouses: Nell Spradlin (m. 1944; died 2000) Frances Hendrickson (m. 2002)
- Children: 2

Signature
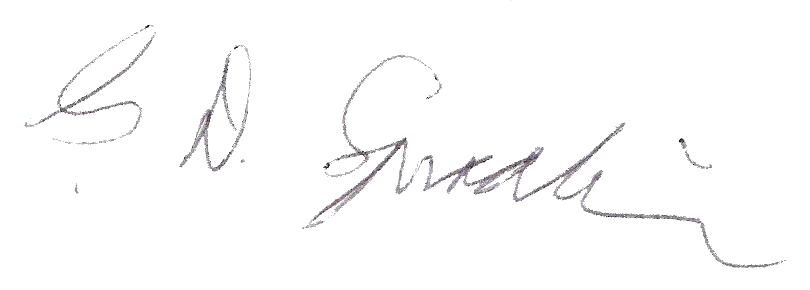

Gervase Duan Spradlin (August 31, 1920 – July 24, 2011) was an American actor, attorney, and businessman. Known for his distinctive accent and voice, he often played devious authority figures or high ranking military officers. He is credited in over 70 television and film productions, and performed with actors such as Robby Benson, Marlon Brando, Al Pacino, James Garner, Charlton Heston, George C. Scott, Martin Sheen, and Johnny Depp. One of his best known roles was that of Senator Pat Geary in The Godfather Part II.

== Early life ==
Spradlin was born on August 31, 1920, in Pauls Valley, Oklahoma. His parents both worked as schoolteachers. Spradlin obtained his bachelor's degree in Education from the University of Oklahoma. He was a member of the Delta Chi fraternity. He then served in the United States Army Air Forces during World War II, where he was stationed in China.

After his military service, Spradlin returned to the University of Oklahoma, where he completed a law degree in 1948.

== Career before acting ==
Spradlin's career as an attorney began in Venezuela. He became an independent oil producer, forming Rouge Oil Company. Before he turned to acting, he was active in local politics, and he campaigned for John F. Kennedy in 1959.

== Acting career ==
In 1964, Spradlin joined the Oklahoma Repertory Theatre.

A notable break for Spradlin resulted from his work in television in the 1960s. Casting director Fred Roos had cast Spradlin in television shows such as I Spy (as the immediate superior of Pentagon spies Kelly Robinson and Alexander Scott in the episode "Tonia"), Mannix (in an uncredited role as Senator Sid Abernathy in the episode "Turn Every Stone"), and Gomer Pyle, U.S.M.C. (as visiting Colonel Driscoll in the episode "Gomer Pyle Super Chef").

He worked with Jack Webb on the series Dragnet, playing multiple roles from a safecracker, a pushy conventioneer caught up in a gambling sting, and a low-level con man. In 1968, he appeared as a false police sergeant, Preston C. Densmore, in S10:E13, “The Phony Police Racket”. Spradlin portrayed Commander Maurice E. "Germany" Curts, Communications Officer, U.S. Pacific Fleet, in an uncredited role in Tora! Tora! Tora! in 1970. He was also in the counter-culture film Zabriskie Point (1970).

When Roos co-produced The Godfather Part II, he recommended Spradlin for the role of Pat Geary, a corrupt U.S. senator from Nevada, and Spradlin played a senator in the 1976 TV miniseries Rich Man, Poor Man Book II. In 1977, he guest-starred along with Ruth Gordon and Mariette Hartley in the Columbo episode, "Try and Catch Me". His film credits included One on One (1977) as an authoritarian basketball coach described by Roger Ebert as "a hard-nosed ace recruiter with a heart of Drano" and Apocalypse Now as General Corman, the somber officer who assigns Martin Sheen's character to the search mission. He played the head football coach B.A. Strother in North Dallas Forty (1979), and "Carolina Military Institute" commandant General Durrell in The Lords of Discipline (1983).

In 1984, Spradlin played a villainous Southern sheriff in Tank. In 1985, Spradlin portrayed President Lyndon B. Johnson in the mini-series Robert Kennedy and His Times, based on the book of the same name by presidential historian Arthur M. Schlesinger Jr. In 1986, he again portrayed an American president when he played Andrew Jackson in the television movie Houston: The Legend of Texas. Also in 1986, he starred in the miniseries Dream West. In 1988, he played Admiral Raymond A. Spruance in the miniseries War and Remembrance. In 1989, Spradlin played a small role in the film The War of the Roses as a divorce lawyer, with Michael Douglas and Kathleen Turner.

Spradlin played a minister in Ed Wood (1994), a conspirator in the attempted assassination of a state governor in Nick of Time (1995), Bishop Dyer in the TV movie Riders of the Purple Sage (1996), which was adapted from Zane Grey's 1912 novel of the same name, and the President of the United States in The Long Kiss Goodnight (1996).

Spradlin retired from acting after Dick (1999), in which he played Ben Bradlee. Although lending his likeness, he did not reprise his role as Pat Geary (whose in-game was voiced by Chris Edgerly) in Electronic Arts' video game adaptation of The Godfather Part II in 2009.

== Personal life and death ==
Spradlin's first wife, Nell, with whom he had two daughters, died in 2000. In 2002, he married Frances Hendrickson.

Spradlin died of natural causes at his cattle ranch in San Luis Obispo, California, on July 24, 2011. He was 90 years old.

== Select filmography ==
Year	Title	Role	Notes
1967	Will Penny	Anse Howard	
1969	Number One	Doctor Tristler	
1969	Hell's Angels '69	Detective	
1970	Zabriskie Point	Lee's Associate	
1970	Tora! Tora! Tora!	Cmdr. Maurice E. Curts - Kimmel's Communications Officer	Uncredited
1970	Monte Walsh	Hal Henderson	
1971	The Hunting Party	Sam Bayard	
1972	The Only Way Home	Philip	
1974	The Godfather Part II	Senator Pat Geary	
1977	One on One	Coach Moreland Smith	
1977	MacArthur	General Eichelberger	
1978	Maneaters Are Loose!	Gordon Hale	
1979	Apocalypse Now	General Corman	
1979	North Dallas Forty	B. A. Strothers	
1980	The Formula	Arthur Clements	
1982	Wrong Is Right	Jack Philindros	
1983	The Lords of Discipline	Gen. Bentley Durrell	
1984	Tank	Sheriff Buelton	
1986	Dream West	Gen. Steven Watts Kearney	
1989	The War of the Roses	Harry Thurmont	
1994	Clifford	Parker Davis	
1994	Ed Wood	Reverend Lemon	
1995	Canadian Bacon	R. J. Hacker	
1995	Nick of Time	Mystery Man	
1996	The Long Kiss Goodnight	President	
1999	Dick	Ben Bradlee	
