= Highland High School (Colorado) =

Location
- 208 West First Street; Ault, Colorado 80610; United States
- Coordinates: 40°34′57″N 104°43′55″W

Information
- School district: Weld RE-9 School District
- CEEB code: 060065
- Principal: Randy Yaussi
- Staff: 10
- Teaching staff: 23.73 (FTE)
- Grades: 9-12
- Enrollment: 291 (2023–2024)
- Student to teacher ratio: 12.26
- Colours: Green, white, gold
- Athletics: CHSAA 3A
- Athletics conference: Patriot League
- Mascot: Husky
- Website: co02201624.schoolwires.net/domain/44

Highland High School is a public high school in Ault, Colorado, United States.

== History ==
Scenes from the 1977 film One on One were filmed at the school.

== Curriculum ==
Highland High School students can take vocational classes at Aims Community College.

== Athletics ==
- Baseball
- Basketball
- Girls' basketball
- Cross country
- Football
- Track and field
- Volleyball
- Cheerleading

Students can go to Eaton High School for softball and swimming.
