= The Night Before (1988 film) =

Film by Thom Eberhardt

- UK VHS Cover
- Directed by: Thom Eberhardt
- Written by: Thom Eberhardt; Gregory Scherick
- Story by: Gregory Scherick
- Produced by: Marty Hornstein
- Starring: Keanu Reeves; Lori Loughlin
- Cinematography: Ronald Víctor García
- Music by: Mark Davis
- Production companies: Kings Road Entertainment; Zealcorp Productions Limited
- Distributed by: Kings Road Entertainment
- Release date: April 15, 1988
- Running time: 90 minutes
- Language: English

The Night Before is a 1988 American comedy film starring Keanu Reeves and Lori Loughlin. Reeves plays Winston Connelly, a nerd, and Loughlin plays Tara Mitchell, the pretty and popular head cheerleader. The Tagline was: "You lost your father's car, sold your prom date and a guy called 'Tito' wants you dead. It's a date that's the time of your life."

== Plot ==
Teen Winston regains consciousness in an alley in the middle of the night with no idea of how he got there. He's dressed in a white tuxedo jacket.

Through a series of flashbacks, he remembers that he was waylaid on his way to the prom the night before. In the meantime, he has to figure out what happened to his wallet, his car keys, his prom date Tara, and why a pimp named "Tito" wants him dead.

Winston finds a parking stub in his pocket. "Danny Boy" offers to open, and then start the car. Naively, he agrees, but once Danny gets it started, he leaves with it.

At Tara's house to take her to the prom, she tells Winston that her losing a bet on a football game is why she has to go to prom with the flattered but clueless nerd Winston. Her police officer father warns him to take care of his one and only daughter and to have her home by midnight.

Having gotten off the freeway, Winston manages to get them lost in the ghetto in East Los Angeles. At a stop light, a man reaches through the driver's window to rob them, they manage to shake him off after a few blocks but he got Winston's wallet.

Going back to a bar he had been earlier, Winston remembers having been there with Tara. The hooker Rhonda, who had warned him not to consume a 'free' drink from the bartender, greets him familiarly.

Rhonda reminds Winston that he accidentally sold Tara to the diminutive pimp Tito for 1500 dollars, and then got thrown out of the bar, told to meet him at dawn to fight.

Winston spends the remainder of the evening searching for Tara in the seedy underworld of East L.A. whilst seeking to avoid Tito's wrath after Tito discovers the identity of Tara's father.

Coming across a guy in the street, it turns out he was the lookout for a toy store robbery. Winston is used by the thieves to get away from the cops. In return, they help him with a lead.

At a brothel, Winston finds out Tito sold Tara to another pimp, so he starts using the $1500 to locate her. He pays a Hispanic man to drive around, asking for her. Winston arrives at the hotel where she's being held for yet a third pimp, who's about to ship her to Morocco.

Winston escapes with Tara from the pimp, recovers his dad's car from Danny Boy, who had planned to sell it to Tito and gets the girl, when she realizes all that he did for her.

== Cast ==
- Keanu Reeves as Winston Connelly
- Lori Loughlin as Tara Mitchell
- Theresa Saldana as Rhonda
- Trinidad Silva as Tito
- Suzanne Snyder as Lisa
- Morgan Lofting as Mom
- Chris Hebert as Brother
- Michael Greene as Capt. Mitchell
- Pamela Gordon as Burly Waitress
- Tommy Lister Jr. as Bartender
- Patrika Darbo as Bimbo
- Lucille Bliss as Gal Baby

== Production ==
It was filmed and set entirely in Los Angeles, California. Members of the group Parliament-Funkadelic appear in the film under the name the Rat's Nest Band.

== Reception ==
David Cornelius of DVDTalk rated it 2.5 out of 5 and wrote "Aside from a few decent moments, the film never lives up to the promise of its set-up."

Kevin Carr of 7M Pictures rated it 3.5 out of 5 and wrote "the film kept me interested through the end, and I enjoyed the diversion from the typical 80s teen comedy".
