= Sidney High School (Texas) =

Location
- 4100 FM 1689; Sidney, Texas 76474; United States; 31.945512°N 98.736980°W

Information
- Type: Public high school
- Established: 1902
- School district: Sidney Independent School District
- Superintendent: James Rucker
- Principal: Deanna Drummond
- Staff: 14.94 (FTE)
- Grades: PK-12
- Enrollment: 162 (2023–2024)
- Student to teacher ratio: 10.17
- Colors: Blue & Gold
- Athletics conference: UIL Class A
- Mascot: Eagle
- Website: Sidney High School

Sidney High School or Sidney School is a public primary, intermediate and highschool located in Sidney, Texas (USA) and classified as a 1A school by the UIL. It is part of the Sidney Independent School District located in Comanche County. In 2015, the school was rated "Met Standard" by the Texas Education Agency.

== Athletics ==
The Sidney Eagles compete in the following sports:

- Basketball
- Cross Country
- Six Man Football
- Golf
- Powerlifting
- Tennis
- Track & Field
