= Marty Hornstein =

American film producer (1937–2013)

- Born: September 11, 1937; The Bronx, New York, U.S.
- Died: December 19, 2013 (aged 76); Thousand Oaks, California, U.S.
- Occupations: Film producer Production manager
- Years active: 1967–2004
- Known for: Star Trek (film series)

Martin Hornstein (September 11, 1937 – December 19, 2013) was an American production manager, producer and second unit director/assistant director. He served from 1976 to 1983 on the faculty at the American Film Institute. Hornstein was senior vice president of production for Kings Road Entertainment. He died in 2013, aged 76.

== Filmography ==
He was producer for all films unless otherwise noted.

=== Film ===
Year	Film	Credit	Notes
1972	Silent Running	Associate producer	
1974	Truck Turner	Associate producer	
1977	One on One		
1982	I, the Jury	Associate producer	
1983	Bad Boys	Associate producer	
1987	The Women's Club	Co-producer	
1988	The Night Before		
1988	Permanent Record	Executive producer	
1991	The Perfect Weapon	Line producer	
1991	Star Trek VI: The Undiscovered Country	Co-producer	
1996	Star Trek: First Contact	Executive producer	
1998	Letters from a Killer	Line producer	
1998	Star Trek: Insurrection	Executive producer	
2001	Along Came a Spider	Executive producer	
2002	Star Trek: Nemesis	Executive producer	
2004	The Last Run	Executive producer	Final film as a producer

Production manager

Year	Film	Role
1972	Silent Running	Production manager
1974	Black Belt Jones	Unit production manager
1974	Truck Turner	Unit production manager
1974	Golden Needles	Unit production manager
1975	Cornbread, Earl and Me	Unit production manager
1975	The Ultimate Warrior	Production manager
1976	Ode to Billy Joe	Unit production manager
1976	Futureworld	Production manager
1982	I, the Jury	Unit production manager
1983	Bad Boys	Unit production manager
1987	Back to the Beach	Production manager
1989	Jacknife	Executive in charge of production
1989	Homer and Eddie	Production manager
1989	The Blood of Heroes	Executive in charge of production
1991	The Perfect Weapon	Unit production manager
1991	Star Trek VI: The Undiscovered Country	Unit production manager
1992	Whispers in the Dark	Production manager: Second unit
1994	Beverly Hills Cop III	Unit production manager
1994	Drop Zone	Production manager
1995	Tommy Boy	Production manager: Second unit, Los Angeles
1996	The Crow: City of Angels	Unit production manager
1996	Star Trek: First Contact	Unit production manager
1998	Letters from a Killer	Unit production manager
1998	Star Trek: Insurrection	Unit production manager
2001	Along Came a Spider	Unit production manager: Los Angeles
2002	Star Trek: Nemesis	Unit production manager
2004	The Last Run	Unit production manager

Second unit director or assistant director

Year	Film	Role
1968	The Heart Is a Lonely Hunter	Second assistant director
1972	The Trial of the Catonsville Nine	Assistant director
1973	Invasion of the Bee Girls	Assistant director
1974	Black Belt Jones	First assistant director
1974	The House of Seven Corpses	Assistant director
1974	Truck Turner	First assistant director

As an actor

Year	Film	Role
1974	The House of Seven Corpses	Danny
1985	Rainy Day Friends	—N/a

=== Television ===
Production manager

Year	Title	Role	Notes
1970	The Bold Ones: The Lawyers	Unit manager	
1970	The Young Country	Unit manager	
1970−71	Marcus Welby, M.D.	Unit manager Unit production manager	
1973	She Lives!	Unit production manager	Television film
1973	Isn't It Shocking?	Unit production manager	Television film
1975	Shell Game	Unit production manager	Television film
1976	Sybil	Unit production manager	Television film
1981	Walking Tall	Unit production manager	
1985	The Atlanta Child Murders	Production manager	Television film
1990	Chips, the War Dog	Unit production manager	Television film

Second unit director or assistant director

Year	Title	Role	Notes
1967	Run for Your Life	Assistant director	
1969	The Whole World Is Watching	Assistant director	Television film
1969	The Name of the Game	Assistant director	
1969	The Lonely Profession	Assistant director	Television film
1969	Night Gallery	Assistant director	
1969	The Bold Ones: The Lawyers	Assistant director	
1970	The Other Man	Assistant director	Television film
1973	The Waltons	Assistant director	
1973	Isn't It Shocking?	First assistant director	Television film
1975	Shell Game	Assistant director	Television film
1985	The Love Boat	First assistant director	
