= Diamond Girl (Seals & Crofts song) =

Single by Seals and Crofts

from the album Diamond Girl
- B-side: "Wisdom"
- Released: May 1973
- Genre: Soft rock
- Length: 3:29 (single version); 4:10 (album version)
- Label: Warner Bros. Records
- Songwriters: Jim Seals, Dash Crofts
- Producer: Louis Shelton

Seals and Crofts singles chronology
"Hummingbird" (1973)	"Diamond Girl" (1973)	"We May Never Pass This Way (Again)" (1973)

"Diamond Girl" is a song by American soft rock duo Seals and Crofts, released as a single in 1973. It is the title track of their fifth studio album, Diamond Girl. Like their previous top 10 hit "Summer Breeze", "Diamond Girl" also reached No. 6 on the Billboard Hot 100, and No. 4 on the Adult Contemporary chart.

== Chart performance ==
=== Weekly charts ===
Chart (1973)	Peak position
Australia (Kent Music Report)	57
Canada RPM Top Singles	13
Canada (RPM) Adult Contemporary	2
US Billboard Easy Listening	4
US Billboard Hot 100	6

=== Year-end charts ===
Chart (1973)	Rank
Canada	134
US Billboard Hot 100	40
