= Seals & Crofts =

American soft rock duo

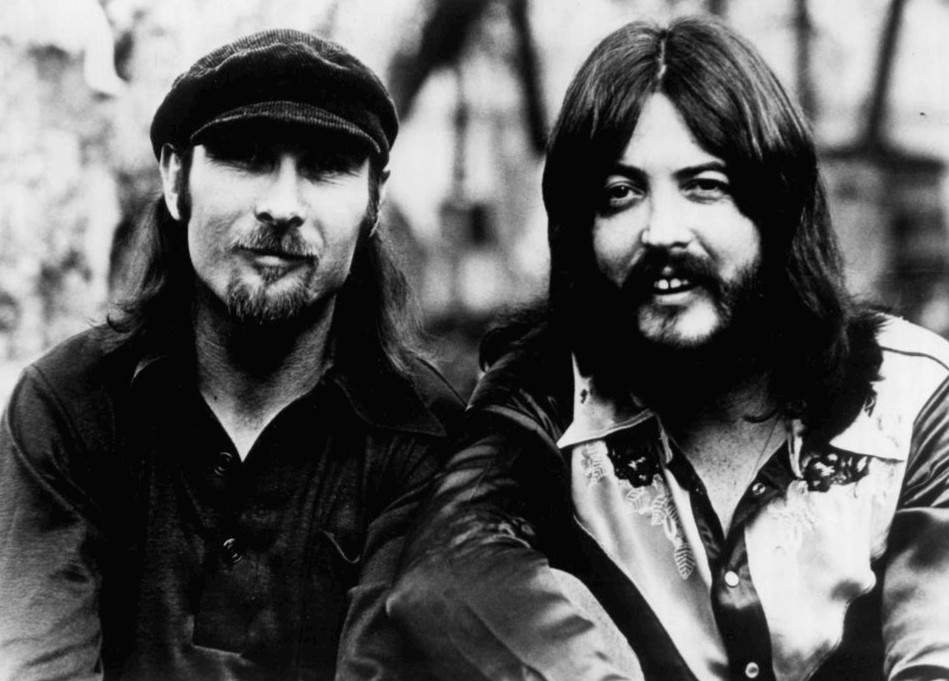
- Seals (left) and Crofts in 1975

Background information
- Origin: Los Angeles, California
- Genres: Soft rock; pop rock; folk rock
- Years active: 1969–1981; 1989–1992; 2004
- Labels: Warner Bros.; Wounded Bird
- Past members: Jim Seals; Dash Crofts
- Website: sealsandcrofts.com

Seals & Crofts were an American soft rock duo formed in 1969 by Jim Seals and Dash Crofts in Los Angeles, California. They are best known for their hits "Summer Breeze" (1972), "Diamond Girl" (1973), and "Get Closer" (1976), each of which peaked at No. 6 on the Billboard Hot 100 chart. Both Seals and Crofts were publicly outspoken advocates for the Baháʼí Faith. Though the duo disbanded in 1981, they reunited briefly in 1989–1992, and again in 2004, when they released their final album, Traces. Seals and his younger brother, the charting singer-songwriter "England" Dan Seals, later performed publicly together as Seals & Seals.

== Early careers ==
Jim Seals and Dash Crofts were both born in Texas; Crofts in Cisco in 1938 and Seals in Sidney in 1942. They first met when Crofts was a drummer for a local band. Later, Seals joined a rockabilly band called Dean Beard and the Crew Cats, in which he played sax; later on, Crofts joined Seals in the band. With Beard, they moved to Los Angeles to join the Champs after the group's "Tequila" reached No. 1 in 1958. Seals also spent time during 1959 in the touring band of Eddie Cochran.

Seals had a song ("It's Never Too Late") recorded by Brenda Lee in 1961, which was featured as the B-side of her U.S. Billboard No. 6 single, "You Can Depend on Me". "It's Never Too Late" reached No. 101 on Billboard and No. 100 on Cash Box (week ending April 8, 1961) in its own right. In the UK, the sides were switched when the single was released, but the single failed to make the UK Singles Chart (at that time only a Top 50 listing).

By 1963, Seals, Crofts, Glen Campbell and Jerry Cole left the Champs to form a band named Glen Campbell and the GCs, which played at The Crossbow in Van Nuys, California. The band lasted only a couple of years before the members went their separate ways. Crofts returned to Texas and Seals joined a band named the Dawnbreakers (a reference to The Dawn-Breakers, a book about the beginnings of the Baha'i Faith). Crofts eventually returned to California to team up with Seals again, in the Dawnbreakers, and thus both Seals and Crofts were introduced to and became members of the Baháʼí Faith. After becoming longtime adherents of the religion, the two began to include references to and passages from Bahá'í scripture in their songwriting. When they appeared in concert, they often remained on stage after the performance to talk about the faith, while local Bahá'ís passed out literature to anyone interested.

== As Seals & Crofts ==
After the failure of the Dawnbreakers, the two decided to play as a duo, with Seals on guitar, saxophone and violin and Crofts on guitar and mandolin. They signed a contract with the record division of Talent Associates (TA) in 1969 and released two LPs, of which only the second reached the Billboard 200 chart, peaking at No. 122 in October 1970. Crofts married fellow Dawnbreaker Billie Lee Day in 1969 and Seals married Ruby Jean Anderson in 1970. The pair signed a new contract with Warner Bros. Records in August 1971. Their first album with their new label, Year of Sunday, peaked at No. 133 in the US. Their second Warner Bros. album, Summer Breeze, was a hit, peaking at No. 7 in 1972. The title cut was released as a single, peaking at No. 4 on the Adult Contemporary chart, and No. 6 Pop. The song "Hummingbird" was the second single released from the album, climbing to No. 12 AC, No. 20 Pop. The album has since been certified twice Platinum by the RIAA for sales of two million copies in the US.

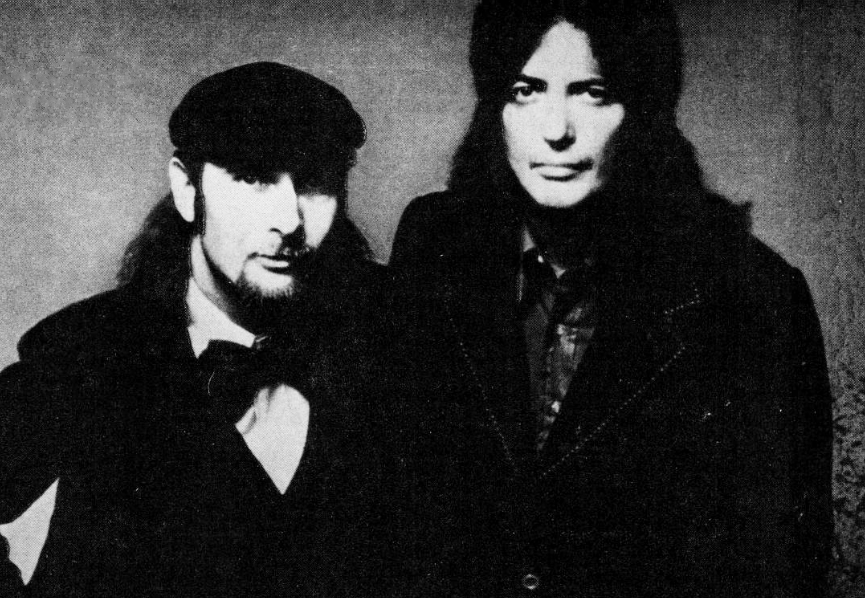
Seals and Crofts in 1974

In 1973 Warner Bros. released Diamond Girl. That album has been certified Gold for sales of 500,000 copies in the US. The title song reached No. 6 on the US chart in July 1973, and another single, "We May Never Pass This Way (Again)", peaked at No. 21.

The controversial Unborn Child followed in 1974. Written shortly after Roe v. Wade, Seals & Crofts expressed their anti-abortion position in the title song, which created a huge dilemma for radio stations. Some stations banned it while others added it to rotation. The album still went Gold despite the controversy and the lack of a Top 40 hit.

The duo played at the California Jam festival in Ontario, California, on April 6, 1974. Attracting over 200,000 fans, the concert put them alongside 1970s acts such as Black Sabbath; Eagles; Emerson, Lake & Palmer; Deep Purple; Earth, Wind & Fire; Black Oak Arkansas; and Rare Earth. Portions of the show were telecast on ABC Television in the US, exposing the duo to a wider audience.

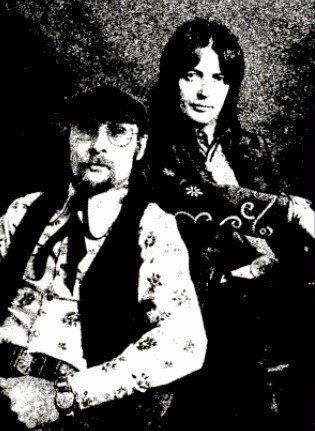
Seals and Crofts

1975's I'll Play for You was a Gold seller as well, featuring the No. 18 hit title track, and their multi-Platinum selling Greatest Hits, released later the same year, has been certified 2× Platinum.

The duo had a return to the singles chart with the song "Get Closer", the title track from their 1976 album. Carolyn Willis (from the R&B vocal group Honey Cone) appeared on the song and it peaked at No. 6 in July of that year. Willis also joined them for their 1976 tour, which resulted in the live album Sudan Village.

The pair also recorded songs that appeared in the feature films One on One (1977) and Foolin' Around (1980), as well as the song "First Years" that was the theme song to the debut (1978–79) season of the television series The Paper Chase.

1978's Takin' It Easy featured the two branching out and experimenting with other types of sounds, including the disco influenced "You're the Love", which reached No. 18. But their Gold selling days were behind them by this point.

In 1979 they contributed to the album Lote Tree, which was a narrated history of the Baháʼí Faith that included songs by them and other artists. It was distributed only within Baháʼí media outlets.

The Longest Road, released in 1980, was their last for Warner Brothers.

== Hiatus and reunions ==
In 1981, after a long and successful run of recordings in the 1970s, the two decided not to renew their contract with Warner Brothers and took a hiatus from music.

There was brief attempt to start up their recording career again in 1983 when they began to work on another album, and Lenny Waronker of Warners expressed interest, but the sessions were abandoned and nothing ever came of it.

Crofts lived in Mexico, Australia, and then Nashville, Tennessee, playing country music and making occasional singles. He resided on a ranch in the Texas Hill Country. Seals moved to Costa Rica and had lived on a coffee farm off and on since 1980, as well as in Nashville and southern Florida.

During the 1980s, despite no longer being officially together as a duo, they continued to appear at several Baháʼí gatherings, including a world peace concert at the Baháʼí Center in Los Angeles for the film and music community in February 1989. After this, they made the rounds of Canadian radio stations and some American talk shows to promote the Baháʼí Peace Document.

Also in 1989, Seals & Crofts officially reunited and made concert appearances once again up in Canada, and then they toured the US in 1991-1992 until disbanding again in late 1992.

In 1998, Crofts released a solo CD titled Today, which contained some re-recordings of Seals & Crofts material.

In 2004, the duo reunited again and recorded their first new album since 1980, released as Traces.

In the early 2000s up to 2008, Seals embarked on various tours with his brother Dan ("England" Dan Seals, of England Dan & John Ford Coley), billing themselves as Seals & Seals and performing their successful hits from Seals & Crofts and England Dan & John Ford Coley, Dan's hits from his solo career and a few original songs written by the two brothers. A few shows featured Jim's sons Joshua on bass guitar and backing vocals and Sutherland on electric guitar.

Seals and Crofts were instrumental in both England Dan Seals and John Ford Coley becoming adherents of the Baha'i Faith, although Coley became a Christian some 28 years later. Dan Seals died of cancer in 2009. At the time of his death, Dan and Jim Seals had been working on songs together. The status of those recordings is unknown.

In December 2010, the bandmates' daughters Juliet (Seals) Crossley and Amelia (Crofts) Dailey, along with Genevieve (Bogan) Dozier, daughter of Seals & Crofts engineer Joey Bogan, formed a musical trio called the Humming Birds. They released their self titled EP The Humming Birds in September 2012.

In 2018, Brady Seals (Jim's cousin) and Lua Crofts (Dash's daughter) began touring as Seals & Crofts 2, performing the catalog of Seals & Crofts, as well as some new music.

After a long illness, Jim Seals died at his home in Nashville, Tennessee, on June 6, 2022, at age 79. Dash Crofts died on March 25, 2026 due to complications from heart surgery at the age of 87.

== Discography ==
=== Albums ===
Year	Title	Peak chart positions		Certifications
Year	Title	US	CAN	Certifications
1969	Seals & Crofts	―	64	
1970	Down Home	122	74	
1971	Year of Sunday	133	―	
1972	Summer Breeze	7	6	RIAA: 2× Platinum
1973	Diamond Girl	4	8	RIAA: Gold
1974	Unborn Child	14	18	RIAA: Gold
1974	Seals & Crofts I & II	81	69	
1975	I'll Play for You	30	31	RIAA: Gold
1975	Greatest Hits	11	8	RIAA: 2× Platinum
1976	Get Closer	37	25	RIAA: Gold
1976	Sudan Village	73	90	
1977	One on One (soundtrack)	118	―	
1978	Takin' It Easy	78	45	
1979	Lote Tree	―	―	
1979	Collection	―	―	
1980	The Longest Road	―	―	
2004	Traces	―	―	
"—" denotes releases that did not chart.

=== Singles ===
Year	Single	Peak chart positions				Album
Year	Single	US	US AC	AUS	CAN	Album
1971	"When I Meet Them"	—	—	—	—	Year of Sunday
1972	"Summer Breeze"	6	4	16	6	Summer Breeze
1973	"Hummingbird"	20	12	—	40	Summer Breeze
1973	"Diamond Girl"	6	4	57	13	Diamond Girl
1973	"We May Never Pass This Way (Again)"	21	2	29	33	Diamond Girl
1974	"Unborn Child"	66	—	—	63	Unborn Child
1974	"King of Nothing"	60	26	—	49	Unborn Child
1975	"I'll Play for You"	18	4	55	28	I'll Play for You
1975	"Castles in the Sand"	—	21	—	—	I'll Play for You
1976	"Baby I'll Give It to You"	58	14	—	85	Sudan Village
1976	"Get Closer" (featuring Carolyn Willis)	6	2	77	19	Get Closer
1977	"Goodbye Old Buddies"	—	10	—	—	Get Closer
1977	"My Fair Share"	28	11	—	27	One on One (soundtrack)
1978	"You're the Love"	18	2	—	8	Takin' It Easy
1978	"Takin' It Easy"	79	—	—	13(AC)	Takin' It Easy
1980	"First Love"	—	37	—	—	Longest Road
"—" denotes releases that did not chart

=== Songs in movies ===
- "My Fair Share" from One on One (1977)
- "These Moments Never Live Again", from Foolin' Around (1980)
- "Summer Breeze" from Dazed and Confused (1993)
- "Summer Breeze" from King of California (2007)
- "Summer Breeze" from Land of the Lost (2009)
- "Summer Breeze" from Vacation (2015)

== See also ==
- Brady Seals, a cousin of Jim Seals, frontman of the country groups Little Texas and Hot Apple Pie
- "England" Dan Seals, Jim Seals' brother, was also a successful recording artist, first in the soft rock duo England Dan & John Ford Coley, and later as a country music artist
- Troy Seals, country music artist, a cousin of Jim Seals

== Bibliography ==
- Bentivegna, Anthony (ed.) sealsandcrofts.com, Novato, California, 2000–2013.
- George-Warren, H. (ed.) The Rolling Stone Encyclopedia of Rock & Roll, 3rd ed., Fireside, New York, 2001.
- Landau, Deborah. "Introducing Seals and Crofts", Stereo Review, January 1971.
