= Hummingbird (Seals & Crofts song) =

Single by Seals and Crofts

from the album Summer Breeze
- B-side: "Say"
- Released: January 1973
- Genre: Soft rock
- Length: 4:35
- Label: Warner Bros.
- Songwriters: Jim Seals, Dash Crofts
- Producer: Louie Shelton

Seals and Crofts singles chronology
"Summer Breeze" (1972)	"Hummingbird" (1973)	"Diamond Girl" (1973)

"Hummingbird" is a song by American soft rock duo Seals and Crofts, released as a single in 1973. It was the second single and opening track from their fourth studio album, Summer Breeze, the follow-up to the LP's title track.

== Background ==
The “hummingbird” in the song’s lyrics is a metaphor for Baha'u'llah, Prophet of the Baha'i Faith. The album version contains a prologue that is omitted from the shorter radio edit.

The song reached No. 20 on the U.S. Billboard Hot 100 and number 15 on the Cash Box Top 100. "Hummingbird" was a bigger Adult Contemporary hit, reaching number 12 on the U.S. chart and number three in Canada.

Harvey Brooks played bass on this song and talks about it in this interview for No Treble.

== Chart performance ==
=== Weekly charts ===
Chart (1973)	Peak position
Canada RPM Top Singles	40
Canada RPM Adult Contemporary	3
U.S. Billboard Easy Listening	12
U.S. Cash Box Top 100	15
U.S. Billboard Hot 100	20

=== Year-end charts ===
Chart (1973)	Rank
U.S. (Joel Whitburn's Pop Annual)	145
