= Ault, Colorado =

Statutory town in Weld County, Colorado, United States

- statutory town
- Town of Ault
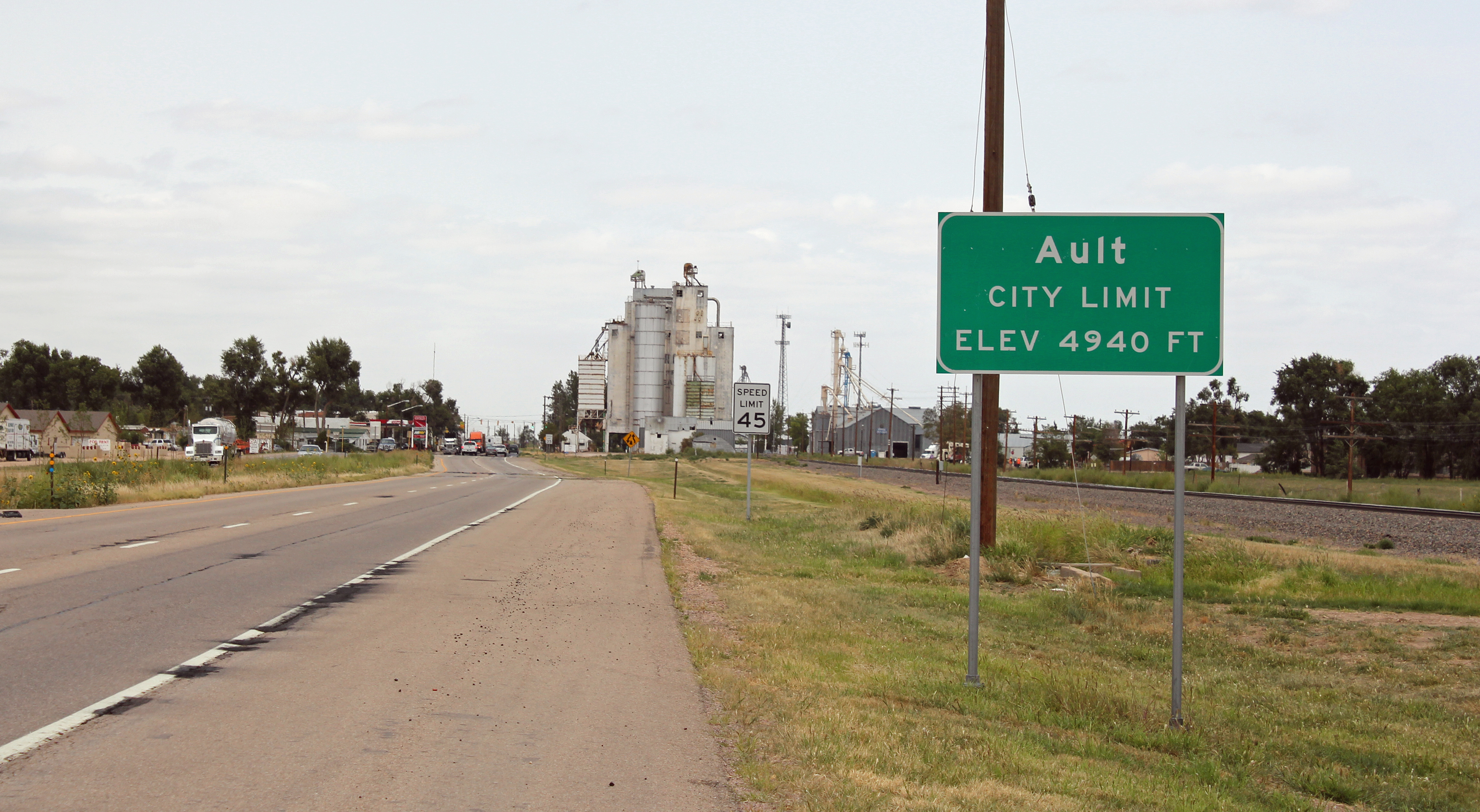
- Entering Ault from the south along U.S. Highway 85

- Location of the Town of Ault in Weld County, Colorado.
- Coordinates: 40°35′30″N 104°44′48″W
- Country: United States
- State: Colorado
- County: Weld
- Incorporated: April 11, 1904, as the Town of Bergdorf
- Named for: Alexander Ault

Government
  - Type: statutory town

Area
  - Total: 1.728 sq mi (4.476 km^{2})
  - Land: 1.728 sq mi (4.476 km^{2})
  - Water: 0 sq mi (0.000 km^{2})
- Elevation: 4,948 ft (1,508 m)

Population (2020)
  - Total: 1,887
  - Density: 1,092/sq mi (422/km^{2})
- Time zone: UTC−07:00 (MST)
  - Summer (DST): UTC−06:00 (MDT)
- ZIP Code: 80610
- Area code: 970
- GNIS town ID: 2411653
- FIPS code: 08-03950
- Website: www.aultcolorado.gov

Ault is a statutory town located in Weld County, Colorado, United States. The town population was 1,887 at the 2020 United States census, a 24.23% increase since the 2010 United States census. Ault is a part of the Greeley, CO Metropolitan Statistical Area and the Front Range Urban Corridor.

== History ==
First called High Land, the town's name was changed to Burgdorff Siding, sometimes called Bergdorf Switch (after a railroad worker, who died in an accident). The Ault, Colorado, post office opened on March 29, 1898. The town was named after Alexander Ault, a Fort Collins, Colorado resident and owner of a flour mill. Mr. Ault had helped to avert financial disaster to the agricultural base by purchasing the entire grain harvest during a year of severe economic hardship. The Town of Berdorf was incorporated on August 26, 1901, but was renamed the Town of Ault in 1904.

Much of the residential area of the town, as well as surrounding farmland, is on land given by the United States government to the Union Pacific Railroad, to be sold to finance railroad construction. A north–south segment of the railroad connecting Denver, Colorado, and Cheyenne, Wyoming, passes through the town, parallel to U.S. Highway 85.

Ault Public Emergency Radio Tower, a former emergency transmission facility, was located here.

== Geography ==
Ault is located at the intersection of U.S. Highway 85 and State Highway 14.

At the 2020 United States census, the town had a total area of 1,106 acres (4.476 km^{2}), all of it land.

== Demographics ==
Historical population
Census	Pop.	Note	%±
1910	569		—
1920	769		35.1%
1930	737		−4.2%
1940	761		3.3%
1950	866		13.8%
1960	799		−7.7%
1970	841		5.3%
1980	1,056		25.6%
1990	1,107		4.8%
2000	1,432		29.4%
2010	1,519		6.1%
2020	1,887		24.2%
U.S. Decennial Census

=== 2020 census ===
As of the 2020 census, Ault had a population of 1,887. The median age was 35.5 years. 25.0% of residents were under the age of 18 and 12.7% of residents were 65 years of age or older. For every 100 females there were 101.2 males, and for every 100 females age 18 and over there were 97.4 males age 18 and over.

0.0% of residents lived in urban areas, while 100.0% lived in rural areas.

There were 709 households in Ault, of which 35.0% had children under the age of 18 living in them. Of all households, 50.9% were married-couple households, 18.2% were households with a male householder and no spouse or partner present, and 21.4% were households with a female householder and no spouse or partner present. About 24.4% of all households were made up of individuals and 9.8% had someone living alone who was 65 years of age or older.

There were 743 housing units, of which 4.6% were vacant. The homeowner vacancy rate was 0.7% and the rental vacancy rate was 7.5%.

Racial composition as of the 2020 census
Race	Number	Percent
White	1,418	75.1%
Black or African American	2	0.1%
American Indian and Alaska Native	29	1.5%
Asian	6	0.3%
Native Hawaiian and Other Pacific Islander	0	0.0%
Some other race	186	9.9%
Two or more races	246	13.0%
Hispanic or Latino (of any race)	508	26.9%

=== 2000 census ===
As of the census of 2000, there were 1,432 people, 540 households, and 381 families residing in the town. The population density was 2,123.7 inhabitants per square mile (820.0/km^{2}). There were 560 housing units at an average density of 830.5 per square mile (320.7/km^{2}). The racial makeup of the town was 79.47% White, 0.07% African American, 0.91% Native American, 0.42% Asian, 16.76% from other races, and 2.37% from two or more races. Hispanic or Latino of any race were 30.24% of the population.

There were 540 households, out of which 38.5% had children under the age of 18 living with them, 55.0% were married couples living together, 10.6% had a female householder with no husband present, and 29.4% were non-families. 26.1% of all households were made up of individuals, and 13.0% had someone living alone who was 65 years of age or older. The average household size was 2.65 and the average family size was 3.20.

In the town, the population was spread out, with 30.6% under the age of 18, 8.8% from 18 to 24, 29.1% from 25 to 44, 19.6% from 45 to 64, and 11.9% who were 65 years of age or older. The median age was 34 years. For every 100 females, there were 100.8 males. For every 100 females age 18 and over, there were 92.6 males.

The median income for a household in the town was $33,846, and the median income for a family was $43,304. Males had a median income of $32,270 versus $23,482 for females. The per capita income for the town was $15,570. About 5.9% of families and 9.1% of the population were below the poverty line, including 10.4% of those under age 18 and 9.5% of those age 65 or over.

== Other ==
- "AULT" is sometimes used as a backronym - "A Unique Little Town."
- Ault hosts two annual town festivals. The ironically-named Fall Festival, which takes place in August, features food, booths, contests and a street dance. The theme of the 2006 Fall Festival was "It's Your Fault if You're Not in Ault!" The theme of the 2007 Fall Festival was "Remembering Not To Forget." Every October, the International Food Fest allows local residents to show off their cultural roots.
- Scenes from the 1977 film "One on One", starring Robby Benson and featuring a young Melanie Griffith, were filmed in various Ault locations.
- Ault's only high school is named "Highland High School", which was changed from "Ault High School" when it combined with schools in nearby towns Pierce, Nunn and Carr, Colorado, in 1963. The Highland School District name comes from the high plains location, rather than the earlier name of the town of Ault, and there is no indication that the early name played any part in the naming decision. Highland High School's mascot is the Husky.
- Ault was mooted as the location for one of two "control stations" of the Decision Information Distribution System that would be used to alert the public of an enemy attack (the other was to have been in Cambridge, Kansas.) The control stations would send the "go" signal to ten distribution stations across the country that would then sign on and play taped messages to the public. (The system was never fully implemented and the station in Ault was not built.)

== See also ==
- Greeley, CO Metropolitan Statistical Area
- Denver-Aurora-Greeley, CO Combined Statistical Area
- Front Range Urban Corridor
