= Dean Beard =

American musician

Dean Beard (August 31, 1935 – April 4, 1989) was an American rockabilly musician, known as the "West Texas Wild Man".

== Early life ==
Beard was born in Santa Anna, Texas. He was the son of Raymond and Opral (Baker) Beard. He lived in Coleman most of his life. In high school, he and his friends formed a band called the Crew Cats.

== Career ==
He played at a night club in Memphis with Elvis Presley in the mid-1950s. Beard's first record "Red Rover"/ "Wake Up Jacob" was released in 1955 for Fox Records. That same year, he made another single, "Time Is Hangin' Heavy On My Hands" /" Sing, Sing, Sing". Neither single attracted much attention.

=== Sun Records ===
Between 1956 and 1957, he recorded for Sun Records, but none of his songs were released until years later. Some of these songs feature a young Jim Seals on saxophone, who would later co-found the duo, Seals and Crofts, with drummer Dash Crofts.

=== Rakin' and Scrapin' ===
In 1957, his most popular hit, “Rakin’ and Scrapin’”, was released on Edmoral Records in March, but didn’t become popular, until another version he made was released a month later for Atlantic Records. He recorded it with Seals on saxophone and Crofts on drums. He kept making records for Atlantic such as, "Party Party". Earlier that year, he teamed up with songwriter Slim Willet, and wrote their most successful songs together.

=== Challenge Records ===
He recorded for Challenge Records in 1958, and was also a pianist with The Champs, who also had a contract with that label.

In 1959, he was fired from the Champs by manager/rhythm guitarist Dave Burgess because he was accused of taking part of the cut meant for Seals and Crofts, but made one more record for Challenge that year.

=== Later career ===
He kept recording for different labels through the 1960s with less success.

His last single was in 1966 for Sims Records called, “Are There Honkey Tonks In Heaven" / "Pocketfull Of Stardust". He achieved recognition in the 1970s and 80s when he started performing live again.

== Death ==
He died at Coleman County Medical Center in Coleman, Texas, on April 4, 1989, from diabetes and other health-related issues.

== Discography ==
Year	Title	Label #
1955	Red Rover / Wake Up, Jacob	Fox 45-405
1955	Sing, Sing, Sing / Time Is Hanging Heavy on My Hands	Fox 45-408
1957	Rakin and Scrapin / On My Mind Again	Edmoral 1011-45
1957	Rakin and Scrapin / On My Mind Again	Atlantic 45-1137
1957	Party, Party / Stand By Me	Atlantic 45-1162
1958	Hold Me Close / Take Time to Love Me	Atlantic 45-1182
1958	Egad, Charlie Brown / Keeper of the Key	Challenge 59033
1959	Little Lover / Holding on to a Memory	Challenge 59048
1959	Little Koko Herrera / Moon Over Mexico (B-side by Chris & Paul Herrera)	Villa 101
1962	(Ciudad) Villa Acuña / The Day That I Lost You	Gaylo BM-112
1962	Villa Acuña / The Day That I Lost You	Candix 341
1962	Tropical Night / Coffee Break	Joed JT-715
1962	The Red Rose / I Don't Know How	Winston 1063
1963	That's How It gets Sunup / Don't Let the Stars Get In Your Eyes	Winston 1073
1963	My Roberta / No Love for Me	Winston 1074
1964	Strawberry Shake / You're the Nearest Thing to Heaven	Gina RT-1116
1965	Party, Party / You Don't Have to Go Home (But You Can't Stay Here)	Sangelo 1/2
1966	Pocketfull of Stardust / (Are There) Honkytonks in Heaven	Sims 299
Unissued
1956	Don't Lie to Me; I Need Your Love; Long Time Gone; Rakin’ and Scrapin’ (alt. Version 1); Rakin‘ and Scrapin‘ (alt. Version 2); Rock Around the Town; What Can I Do (Version 1); What Can I Do (Version 2); When You're Gone	Sun
1958	My Roberta; Shiverin’ and Shakin’	Challenge
	Party, Party (alt. Version)	
	Boney Shuffle	[status unknown]
