= Sidney, Texas =

- Unincorporated community
- Location within Texas Location within the United States
- Coordinates: 31°56′58″N 98°44′14″W
- Country: United States
- State: Texas
- County: Comanche
- Elevation: 1,431 ft (436 m)
- Time zone: UTC-6 (Central (CST))
  - Summer (DST): UTC-5 (CDT)
- Area code: 325
- GNIS feature ID: 1379075

Sidney is an unincorporated community in Comanche County, Texas, United States. According to the Handbook of Texas, the community had a population of 196 in 2000.

== History ==
Sidney was originally known as Jimmie's Creek, Canady, or Round Mountain before being named after a son of the community's first postmaster, John C. Stapp, in 1886.

The area was settled some time before 1870 by William Yarbrough and J.A. Wright. The pioneers chose this location for the spring-fed stream that was nearby. Later, this stream was named Jimmie's Creek for Captain James Cunningham. The first school, a one-room log cabin, was organized in the fall of 1877 with 28 students. By the end of the first school year, the students had increased to some 40 in number, and by 1880, 80 were attending school for the short annual term.

Tom Davis opened the first general store in 1883, and the first cotton gin was erected in 1895 by W. C. Jackson. When the community reached peak population in the late 1890s and 1900s, Sidney had a barber shop, a two-story lodge building, drug stores, gins, and general mercantile stores that sold items ranging from groceries to buggies.

In the 1940s, the community had 200 people, a school, and several churches and businesses. The community's population was 148 in 2010.

Although Sidney is unincorporated, it has a post office, with the ZIP Code 76474.

== Geography ==
Sidney is located on Farm to Market Road 1689, about 9 mi (14 km) northwest of Comanche in western Comanche County.

== Education ==
The community's first school was founded in 1877. W.D. Cox was the teacher then. It continued to operate in 1940. The Sidney Independent School District serves area students.

== Notable person ==
- Jim Seals, musician
