= Summer Breeze (song) =

1972 single by Seals & Crofts

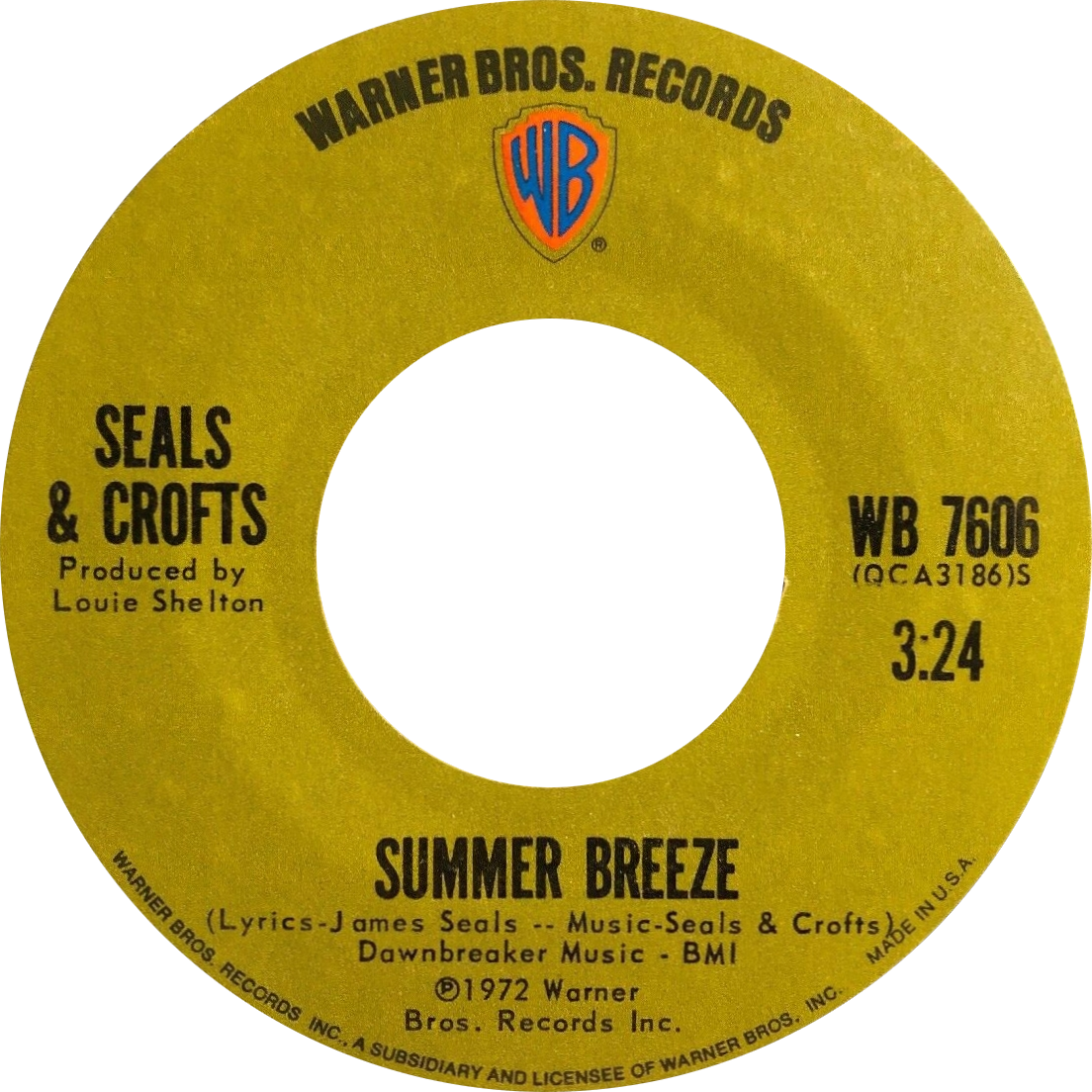
- One of side-A labels of the US single

Single by Seals & Crofts

from the album Summer Breeze
- B-side: "East of Ginger Trees"
- Released: August 1972
- Genre: Soft rock
- Length: 3:25
- Label: Warner Bros.
- Songwriters: Jim Seals, Dash Crofts
- Producer: Louie Shelton

Seals & Crofts singles chronology
"When I Meet Them" (1971)	"Summer Breeze" (1972)	"Hummingbird" (1973)

Audio
- "Summer Breeze" on YouTube

"Summer Breeze" is a 1972 song by American soft rock duo Seals & Crofts. It is the title track of their fourth studio album, and was released as the album's lead single in August 1972. The song reached No. 6 on the US Billboard Hot 100 chart in the US. In 2013, it was ranked No. 13 in Rolling Stone′s "Best Summer Songs of All Time". The song also became a hit for the Isley Brothers in 1974.

== Original Seals & Crofts version ==
According to Dash Crofts, Jim Seals wrote the song, although the two shared writing credit.

Released nine days ahead as the lead single and title track of their 1972 Summer Breeze album, Seals & Crofts' original version reached No. 6 on the Billboard Pop Singles chart in the US that same year. Bruce Eder of AllMusic referred to it as "one of those relentlessly appealing 1970s harmony-rock anthems ... appropriately ubiquitous on the radio and in the memory".

Seals & Crofts performed the song live on the Bobby Darin Amusement Company variety show in 1972.

The song has also been featured in many movies including Dazed and Confused, Land of the Lost, Vacation, Vacation Friends, and Tron: Ares. It has also featured in a number of TV series including Freaks and Geeks, Family Guy, The Mindy Project, and Lioness.

A remixed version of the song was featured in a commercial for the Gap in 2004, (featured on the What Is Hip? Remix Project One compilation album and colloquially titled the Tsuper Tsunami/Philip Steir Remix) and the duo would also re-record the song for their album Traces later that year, which became a hit on the Adult Contemporary charts.

=== Personnel ===
- Jim Seals – lead & background vocals, guitar, saxophone
- Dash Crofts – background vocals, electric guitar, toy piano, piano w/taped strings
- Larry Knechtel – piano
- Louie Shelton - guitar
- Harvey Brooks – bass
- Jim Gordon – drums

=== Chart performance ===
==== Weekly charts ====
Chart (1972–1973)	Peak position
Australia (Kent Music Report)	16
Canada RPM Top Singles	6
New Zealand (Listener)	14
US Billboard Hot 100	6
US Billboard Adult Contemporary	4
US Cash Box Top 100	6

Chart (2004)	Peak position
US Billboard Adult Contemporary	17

==== Year-end charts ====
Chart (1972)	Rank
U.S. (Joel Whitburn's Pop Annual)	66

Chart (1973)	Rank
Australia	103

=== Certifications ===
Region	Certification	Certified units/sales
New Zealand (RMNZ)	2× Platinum	60,000^{‡}
^{‡} Sales+streaming figures based on certification alone.

== Isley Brothers version ==
"Summer Breeze"
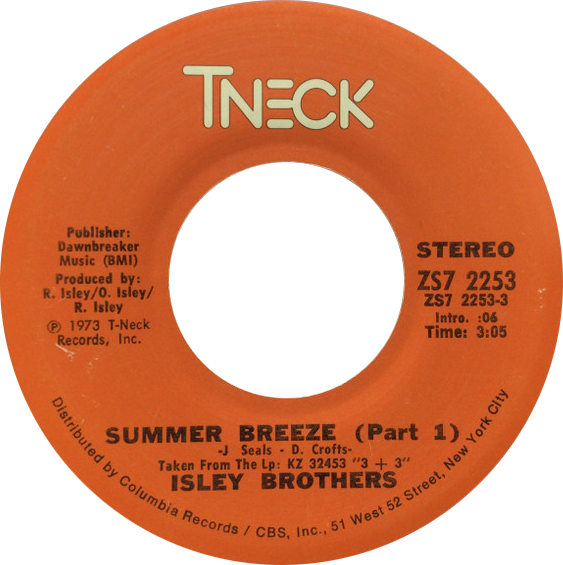
- Side A of the US single

Single by The Isley Brothers

from the album 3 + 3
- A-side: "Summer Breeze (Part 1)"
- B-side: "Summer Breeze (Part 2)"
- Released: March 1974
- Genre: Soul
- Length: 6:12
- Label: T-Neck
- Songwriters: Jim Seals; Dash Crofts

Official audio
- "The Isley Brothers – Summer Breeze, Pts. 1 & 2 (Official Audio)" on YouTube

The song was covered in a harder rock-soulful style by the Isley Brothers as a single in 1974. Issued also on their 1973 album 3 + 3, it reached number sixty on the pop chart, number ten on the R&B chart, and number sixteen on the UK Singles Chart.

The Isley Brothers performed "Summer Breeze" on the music TV show Soul Train in 1974. It was featured in season 8, episode 18 of The Blacklist and also in a 2014 episode of Scandal. It was sampled in the track "All in My Mind" by MC Hammer along with his newly formed rap group, Oakland Fight Club featuring Mistah F.A.B. (2014).

=== Credits ===
- Ronald Isley – lead vocals, background vocals
- O'Kelly Isley Jr. – background vocals
- Rudolph Isley – background vocals
- Ernie Isley – electric guitar, acoustic guitar, percussion
- Marvin Isley – bass guitar, percussion
- Chris Jasper – piano, keyboards
- George Moreland – drums, percussion

=== Certifications ===
Region	Certification	Certified units/sales
United Kingdom (BPI)	Silver	200,000^{‡}
^{‡} Sales+streaming figures based on certification alone.

=== Chart performance ===
Chart (1974)	Peak position
Canada Singles (RPM)	84
UK Singles (Official Charts Company)	16
US Billboard Hot 100	60
US Billboard Hot Soul Singles	10

== Type O Negative version ==
"Summer Breeze"

Promotional single by Type O Negative

from the album Bloody Kisses
- Released: 1995
- Recorded: 1993
- Studio: Systems Two, Brooklyn
- Genre: Doom metal, gothic metal
- Length: 4:49
- Label: Roadrunner
- Songwriters: Jim Seals; Dash Crofts
- Producers: Peter Steele, Josh Silver

Type O Negative singles chronology
"Christian Woman" (1993)	"Summer Breeze" (1995)	"My Girlfriend's Girlfriend" (1996)

Type O Negative released a cover of the song in August 1993 on their album Bloody Kisses altering their version to match their gothic metal style. Their version was originally to be titled "Summer Girl", featuring new lyrics written by Peter Steele, but after Seals & Crofts found the lyrical content distasteful, the original lyrics were sung instead and the second half of their version being split into its own song called "Set Me on Fire".

A Rick Rubin remixed version is featured in the opening of the 1997 slasher film I Know What You Did Last Summer and is also included in the film's soundtrack.

=== Tracklist ===
All songs written by Peter Steele unless otherwise noted.

No.	Title	Writer(s)	Length
1.	"Summer Breeze" (New Version)	Seals and Crofts	4:32
2.	"Summer Breeze" (Full Length New Version)	Seals and Crofts	8:19
3.	"Blood & Fire" (New Version)		4:35
4.	"Christian Woman" (edit)		4:26

=== Credits ===
- Peter Steele – lead vocals, bass guitar
- Kenny Hickey – guitar, backing vocals
- Josh Silver – keyboards, backing vocals
- Sal Abruscato – drums, percussion

== Other notable cover versions ==
- Australian band Stylus recorded a version in 1975, which appeared on their 'Where in the World' album, reaching number 58 on the Australian charts.
- English singer Geoffrey Williams released a version in 1992 as a single, and it peaked at number 56 on the week ending August 16, 1992, on the UK Singles Chart. It also peaked at number 32 on the week ending November 22, 1992, on New Zealand's Official Top 40 Singles chart.
- Australian-American country musician Keith Urban recorded the song for his 2026 album, Flow State.
