= Dash Crofts =

American musician (1938–2026)

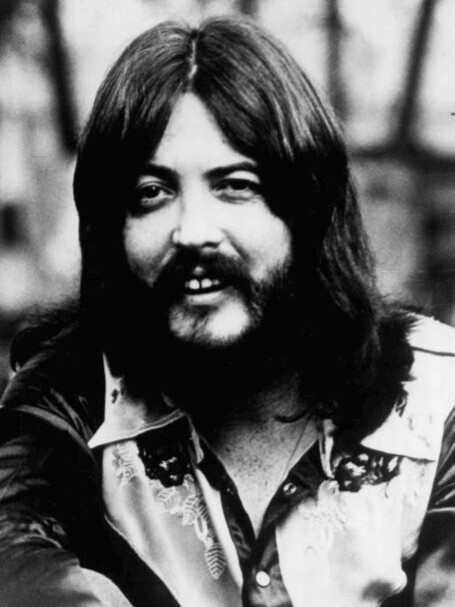
- Crofts in 1975

Background information
- Born: Darrell George Crofts; August 14, 1938; Cisco, Texas, U.S.
- Died: March 25, 2026 (aged 87) Austin, Texas, U.S.
- Genres: Folk; rock and roll
- Instruments: Vocals; guitar; mandolin; drums
- Years active: 1957–2026
- Formerly of: The Champs; Seals and Crofts

Darrell George "Dash" Crofts (August 14, 1938 – March 25, 2026) was an American musician, one half of the soft rock duo Seals & Crofts with Jim Seals.

Crofts was a drummer in his early career, when he met Jim Seals, then a saxophonist. The two would go on to play in The Champs, eventually creating the duo Seals and Crofts, in which both members sang and played the guitar and mandolin among other instruments; they would go on to record hits such as "Summer Breeze" and "Diamond Girl".

== Early life ==
Darrell George Crofts was born in Cisco, Texas on August 14, 1938, to parents Sutton Phillp Crofts and Mary French Crofts, née Hicks. He had a twin sister named Dorothy. Crofts's nickname "Dash" came from when he was a baby; his mother entered him and his twin into a "beautiful baby" contest and said they would look even cuter if they entered as "Dot" and "Dash".

== Career ==
Crofts took up the piano at age five before switching to drums at age ten. In high school he played drums in Dean Beard & the Crew Cats, where he met the band's saxophone player Jim Seals. After Crofts graduated, his father found a job for him which he quit after just one day. He and Seals moved to Southern California and both joined The Champs from 1958 to 1965. Crofts was drafted in 1962 and spent two years with the Army in Fort Bragg, North Carolina.

In 1969, the two started working as a recording duo under the name "Seals & Crofts". Throughout the 1970s the duo had hit after hit with their self-penned songs including "Summer Breeze" and "Diamond Girl" and had four albums go gold and two go platinum. Both Seals and Crofts picked up the guitar and Crofts additionally took up the mandolin as it would be easier to take on planes and carry around while travelling.

The two parted ways in 1983 but reunited in the 1990s and in 2004. Crofts released a solo album, Today, in 1998.

== Personal life and death ==
Both Crofts and Seals were adherents of the Baháʼí Faith, which was an inspiration for their music.

Crofts, his wife and two children lived in Mexico, then Australia, and then Nashville, Tennessee. He lived on a farm in Texas and raised Arabian horses. Crofts died in Austin, Texas, from complications of heart surgery on March 25, 2026, at the age of 87.
