= Jim Seals =

American musician (1942–2022)

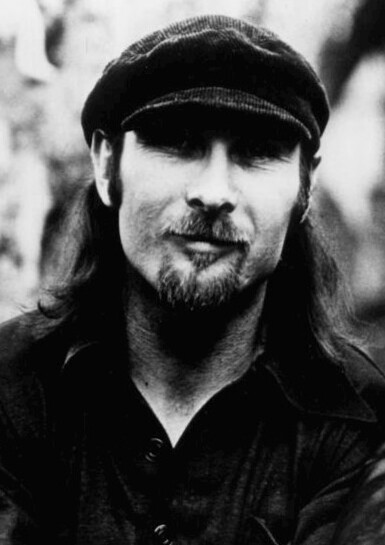
- Seals in 1975
- Born: James Eugene Seals; October 17, 1942; Sidney, Texas, US
- Died: June 6, 2022 (aged 79); Nashville, Tennessee, US
- Spouse: Ruby Jean Anderson (1970–2022)
- Children: 3
- Relatives: England Dan (brother), Brady and Troy Seals (cousins)
- Musical career
- Genres: Folk; rock and roll
- Instruments: Vocals; guitar; mandolin; violin; saxophone
- Years active: 1957–2017
- Formerly of: The Champs; Seals & Crofts

James Eugene Seals (October 17, 1942 (Note: While some sources have said that Seals was born on October 17, 1941, public records of his birth list him as being born in 1942.) – June 6, 2022) was an American folk musician. He was one half of the folk duo Seals & Crofts with Dash Crofts and was the older brother of Danny "England Dan" Seals.

Seals was a multi-instrumentalist, playing the fiddle as a child before playing saxophone in bands throughout his teenage years, where he eventually met Dash Crofts, then a drummer. The two formed soft rock duo Seals & Crofts, in which both members sang and played the guitar and mandolin among other instruments; they would go on to record hits such as "Summer Breeze" and "Diamond Girl". Seals died in 2022.

== Early life ==
Seals was born to pipefitter Wayland Seals and Susan Taylor Seals in Sidney, Texas. He grew up in Iraan, Texas. Seals recalled that he grew up surrounded by oil rigs and smoke covered the air. "The stench was so bad, you couldn't breathe." Jim's older brother, Eddie, was born in 1937 to Wayland and his former partner Clodell, who died in 1940. His father played guitar and he encouraged Jim to play the guitar. When Jim showed interest in a traveling fiddler soon after, at age 5 or 6, Wayland bought him his first fiddle to learn to play on.

== Career ==
Seals quickly learned to play the fiddle. In 1952, when he was about ten years old, he entered a west Texas contest and won the fiddle division. His younger brother Dan played stand-up bass. Their father entered, and won, the guitar category.

He also learned how to play the saxophone and formed The Seals Family Band with Dan. In high school he played the sax in Dean Beard & the Crew Cats where he met Darrell "Dash" Crofts who joined the band on drums. After graduating, they moved to California and joined The Champs who had just released the song "Tequila" in 1958. The two remained in the band until its disbanding in 1965. The two then worked in The Dawnbreakers with The Champs' Glen Campbell. From 1958 to 1965, Seals released five singles as "Jimmy Seals"; his first single in 1958 was released under "Jimmy Seals And His Sax".

Jim and Dash would go on to write songs for artists such as The Monkees and Gene Vincent before working as a recording duo in the 1970s as Seals & Crofts. The duo were best known for their songs "Summer Breeze" and "Diamond Girl" and released five gold certified studio albums from 1972 to 1976. The duo parted ways in 1980; Seals and his family moved to Costa Rica and lived on a coffee farm. Seals and his younger brother Dan, who eventually made a name for himself as England Dan, toured as a duo called "Seals & Seals". Seals & Crofts reunited in the 1990s and in 2004.

== Personal life and death ==
Seals married Ruby Jean Anderson in 1970; Seals and Crofts wrote "Ruby Jean and Billie Lee" for their wives. They had three children Juliette (now Juliette Crossley), Joshua and Sutherland. Seals moved to Nashville, Tennessee where he spent the rest of his life. He suffered a stroke in 2017 and retired from performing.

His younger brother was singer Danny "England Dan" Seals who was one half of the soft rock duo England Dan & John Ford Coley with John Ford Coley; Dan died in 2009. Seals' cousins are Brady Seals and Troy Seals; Brady is a country singer and former vocalist for Little Texas and Hot Apple Pie, Troy was a singer-songwriter who died in 2025.

Seals died at his home in Nashville, aged 79, on June 6, 2022 from an unspecified chronic illness.

== Solo discography ==
Unless noted, all were released under "Jimmy Seals".

- "Biscayne Bay / Juarez" — Winston label — released as "Jimmy Seals And His Sax" — 1958
- "Wish For You, Want For You, Wait For You / Runaway Heart" — Challenge label — 1962
- "Lady Heartbreak / Grounded" — Challenge label — 1963
- "Everybody's Doing The Jerk / Wa-Hoo" — Challenge label — 1964
- "The Yesterday Of Our Love / She's Not A Bad Girl" — Challenge label — 1965
