= Louis Shelton =

American guitarist and music producer

- Also known as: Louie Shelton
- Born: William Louis Shelton; April 6, 1941 (age 85); Little Rock, Arkansas, U.S.
- Occupations: Musician, music producer
- Instrument: Guitar
- Website: www.louieshelton.com

William Louis Shelton (born April 6, 1941) is an American guitarist and music producer.

== Biography ==
During the 1960s, 1970s, and 1980s Shelton was a session musician working in recording studios around Hollywood. Among his more notable session work was for the Monkees, including their first self-titled album, and both recordings of the Boyce and Hart songs, "Last Train to Clarksville", "Valleri", and "(Theme From) The Monkees". Shelton played the flamenco-style guitar solo on "Valleri", which Michael Nesmith had to mimic for the cameras on their TV series. Even after the Monkees began playing on their own records, Shelton remained a favorite among their session players. Shelton was inducted into the Musicians Hall of Fame and Museum, the Arkansas Entertainers Hall of Fame and is a member of the famous group of LA session musicians known as "The Wrecking Crew".

Other recording credits include:

Marvin Gaye, Simon and Garfunkel, Stevie Wonder, Boz Scaggs, Gladys Knight & the Pips, the Jackson 5, Neil Diamond, John Lennon, Barbra Streisand, the Carpenters, the Mamas & the Papas, Glen Campbell, Ella Fitzgerald, the Partridge Family, James Brown, Diana Ross, Otis Spann, Whitney Houston, Joe Cocker, Kenny Rogers, Henry Mancini, Dave Grusin, Quincy Jones, Lalo Schifrin and Victor Wooten. He played the guitar solo on Lionel Richie's hit "Hello", Boz Scaggs's "Lowdown" and David Gates' "Do You Believe He's Coming".

Shelton became a producer in the 1970s, working with recording artists including Seals and Crofts, Art Garfunkel, Amy Wooley, and England Dan & John Ford Coley, as well as Australian acts Tracey Arbon, Noiseworks and Southern Sons. He remains active and continues to record, produce, and perform.

He is a 2007 inductee into the Musicians Hall of Fame as a member of the Wrecking Crew. In 2013 he was inducted into the Arkansas Entertainers Hall of Fame.

Shelton, who now resides in Australia, was reunited with the surviving Monkees (Mike Nesmith and Micky Dolenz) during their 2019 Australian tour, and made a special guest appearance with the group, performing his famous guitar part live on "Last Train to Clarksville" at the group's Brisbane concert on 13 June 2019.

== Selected discography ==
=== As leader ===
- Touch Me (Warner Bros. Records, 1969)
- Guitar (Lightyear, 1995)
- Hot & Spicy (Sin-Drome, 1998)
- Urban Culture (Lightyear, 2000)
- Nashville Guitars (Lightyear, 2000)
- Souvenir
- Jazz Cafe

=== As sideman ===
With David Ackles

- Subway to the Country (Elektra Records, 1970)

With Alessi Brothers

- Driftin' (A&M Records, 1978)

With James Brown

- Soul on Top (King, 1970)

With Solomon Burke

- Electronic Magnetism (MGM Records, 1971)

With Glen Campbell

- Oh Happy Day (Capitol Records, 1970)
- The Last Time I Saw Her (Capitol Records, 1971)

With Vikki Carr

- Ms. America (Columbia Records, 1973)

With David Cassidy

- Cherish (Bell, 1972)
- Rock Me Baby (Bell, 1973)
- Dreams Are Nuthin' More Than Wishes (Bell, 1973)

With Sonny & Cher

- Mama Was a Rock and Roll Singer, Papa Used to Write All Her Songs (MCA Records, 1973)

With Merry Clayton

- Gimme Shelter (Ode Records, 1970)

With England Dan & John Ford Coley

- Fables (A&M Records, 1972)

With Neil Diamond

- Tap Root Manuscript (Uni Records, 1970)

With The 5th Dimension

- Living Together, Growing Together (Bell, 1973)
- Soul & Inspiration (Bell, 1974)

With Cass Elliot

- Cass Elliot (RCA Victor, 1972)

With José Feliciano

- José Feliciano (Motown, 1981)

With Michael Franks

- Michael Franks (Brut, 1973)

With The Friends of Distinction

- Whatever (RCA Victor, 1970)
- Love Can Make It Easier (RCA Victor, 1973)

With Marvin Gaye

- Let's Get It On (Tamla, 1973)

With Art Garfunkel

- Angel Clare (Columbia Records, 1973)
- Breakaway (Columbia Records, 1975)
- Fate for Breakfast (Columbia Records, 1979)

With David Gates

- First (Elektra Records, 1973)

With Marjoe Gortner

- Bad, but Not Evil (Chelsea Records, 1972)

With Lani Hall

- Sun Down Lady (A&M Records, 1972)

With Dan Hill

- If Dreams Had Wings (Epic Records, 1980)

With Whitney Houston

- Whitney Houston (Arista Records, 1985)

With The Hues Corporation

- Freedom for the Stallion (RCA Victor, 1973)

With Al Kooper

- Easy Does It (Columbia Records, 1970)
- New York City (You're a Woman) (Columbia Records, 1971)

With Peggy Lee

- Bridge over Troubled Water (Capitol Records, 1970)
- Make It with You (Capitol Records, 1970)
- Norma Deloris Egstrom from Jamestown, North Dakota (Capitol Records, 1972)

With John Lennon

- Rock 'n' Roll (Apple, 1975)

With Lulu

- Lulu (Polydor Records, 1973)

With The Mamas & the Papas

- People Like Us (Dunhill, 1970)

With Melanie

- Photograph (Atlantic Records, 1976)
- Seventh Wave (Powderworks, 1983)

With The Monkees

- The Monkees (Colgems Records, 1966)
- More of the Monkees (Colgems Records, 1967)
- The Birds, the Bees & the Monkees (Colgems Records, 1968)
- Instant Replay (Colgems Records, 1969)
- Changes (Colgems Records, 1970)

With Wayne Newton

- Daddy Don't You Walk So Fast (Chelsea Records, 1972)
- While We're Still Young (Chelsea Records, 1973)

With Brenda Patterson

- Brenda Patterson (Playboy Records, 1973)

With Teddy Pendergrass

- Love Language (Asylum Records, 1984)

With Lionel Richie

- Can't Slow Down (Motown Records, 1983)
- Dancing on the Ceiling (Motown Records, 1986)

With Austin Roberts

- The Last Thing On My Mind (Chelsea Records, 1973)

With Kenny Rogers

- Share Your Love (Liberty Records, 1981)

With Boz Scaggs

- Silk Degrees (Columbia Records, 1976)

With Dan Seals

- Make It Home (Lightyear, 2002)

With Judee Sill

- Heart Food (Asylum Records, 1973)

With Otis Spann

- Sweet Giant of the Blues (Blues Time, 1970)

With Barbra Streisand

- Stoney End (Columbia Records, 1971)
- Barbra Joan Streisand (Columbia Records, 1971)

With Sarah Vaughan

- Songs of The Beatles (Atlantic Records, 1981)
