= New Orleans in fiction =

New Orleans is featured in a number of works of fiction. This article in an ongoing effort to list the books, movies, television shows, and comics that are set or filmed, in whole or part, in New Orleans.

== Books ==
Authors who have repeatedly or frequently used New Orleans as a setting for their fiction include James Lee Burke, Poppy Z. Brite, Truman Capote, Nancy A. Collins, Barbara Hambly, Lafcadio Hearn, Frances Parkinson Keyes, Caitlín R. Kiernan, Anne Rice, James Sallis, Julie Smith, and Alexandrea Weis. The most significant novel featuring the city may be the Pulitzer Prize-winning A Confederacy of Dunces by John Kennedy Toole (1980). Works that feature the city include:

- Accordion Crimes (1996) by E. Annie Proulx (setting for exposition and rising action)
- Albert, Himself by Jeff W. Bens
- The Anti-Vampire Tale (2010) by Lewis Aleman
- The Awakening (1899) by Kate Chopin
- The Beautiful (2019) by Renée Ahdieh
- Blue Moon Over New Orleans by Anna Mayhall Munding (post WWII mystery novel set in New Orleans)
- Blues and Trouble: Twelve Stories by Tom Piazza (the first short story, "Brownsville", is set in New Orleans)
- Chasing the Devil's Tail (2001) and sequels by David Fulmer (jazz mysteries featuring Valentin St. Cyr)
- The Chimera and Other Dark Poems (2023) by Michael Perret
- City of Refuge by Tom Piazza
- Clarimonde by Napier Bartlett (features a Creole tale and a description of New Orleans during the American Civil War)
- The Client (1993) and The Pelican Brief (1992) by John Grisham
- The Coffee Shop Chronicles of New Orleans - Part 1 (2010) by David Lummis
- Cold Streak (2008) by Lewis Aleman
- The Condor Passes (1971) and The House on Coliseum Street (1961) by Shirley Ann Grau
- A Confederacy of Dunces (1980) by John Kennedy Toole
- Crescent City (1984) by Belva Plain
- Crooked Man (1994) and nine subsequent Tubby Dubonnet Mysteries by Tony Dunbar
- The Crystal City (2003) by Orson Scott Card (features an alternate-history version of New Orleans in which it is controlled by the Spanish and called 'Nueva Barcelona' or 'Barcy')
- A Density of Souls (2000) by Christopher Rice
- Dinner at Antoine's (1948), Crescent Carnival (1942), and others by Frances Parkinson Keyes
- Exquisite Corpse by Poppy Z. Brite
- Faces in Time by Lewis Aleman (2009)
- Fantasy Lover (2006) and sequels, comprising The Dark-Hunter Series by Sherrilyn Kenyon
- Fat White Vampire Blues (2003) and sequel by Andrew Fox
- The Feast of All Saints (1979) by Anne Rice
- Fleur deKey a debut French Quarter mystery by vickie pettee
- Flying Solo: An Unconventional Aviatrix Navigates Turbulence in Life by Jeannette Vaughan
- The three Frankenstein books by Dean Koontz, Kevin J. Anderson, and Ed Gorman [Prodigal Son (2005), City of Night (2005), and Lost Souls (2010)]
- A Free Man of Color (1997) and sequels (The Benjamin January Mysteries) by Barbara Hambly
- Gone with the Wind (1936) by Margaret Mitchell (location of Rhett and Scarlett's honeymoon)
- The Grandissimes (1880) by George Washington Cable
- A Hall of Mirrors (1967) by Robert Stone
- Hoodoo Money by Sharon Cupp Pennington
- Interview with the Vampire (1976) and sequels, collectively known as The Vampire Chronicles, by Anne Rice
- The epic fiction Jitterbug Perfume (1984) by Tom Robbins uses modern day New Orleans as one of four major settings along with 8th-century Bohemia, modern day Seattle, and modern day Paris
- John Raven Beau by O'Neil De Noux named Best Police Book of 2011 by police-writers.com.
- Junkie (1953) by William S. Burroughs
- Lafitte the Pirate by Lyle Saxon, the basis for the 1938 film The Buccaneer and the 1958 remake of the same name
- Life on the Mississippi (1883) by Mark Twain (Chapter XLI: "The Metropolis of the South")
- The Liquor series (2004) by Poppy Z. Brite
- Lives of the Mayfair Witches (1990–1994) by Anne Rice
- "Madam: A Novel of New Orleans" (2014) by Cari Lynn and Kellie Martin (based on true events of Storyville and Madam Josie Arlington)
- Manon Lescaut (1731) by Antoine François Prévost (features the early French colony at New Orleans at one point in the book)
- The Map of Moments (2009) by Christopher Golden and Tim Lebbon
- Midnight Bayou (2001) and Honest Illusions (1992) by Nora Roberts
- Misisipi (2012) by Michael Reilly, climaxing during the events of Hurricane Katrina
- Monsieur Motte (1888) by Grace King
- Monster Hunter Memoirs: Sinners(2016) and Monster Hunter Memoirs: Saints(2018) by Larry Correia and John Ringo.
- Mosquitos (1927) and Pylon (1935) by William Faulkner (the latter novel takes place in "New Valois," a thinly disguised New Orleans)
- Moth (1993) and sequels (Lew Griffin mysteries) by James Sallis
- The Moviegoer (1961) by Walker Percy (winner of the 1962 National Book Award)
- Mules and Men (1935) by Zora Neale Hurston
- To My Senses, Recovery, Sacrifice, The Ghosts of Rue Dumaine, Dark Perception, Taming Me, Cover to Covers, Dark Attraction, The Satyr's Curse, Blackwell by Alexandrea Weis
- Neon Rain (1987) and sequels (Dave Robicheaux mysteries) by James Lee Burke
- New Orleans, Mon Amour (2006) by Andrei Codrescu (collection of essays and short stories)
- New Orleans Mourning (1990) and sequels (Skip Langdon mysteries) by Julie Smith
- New Orleans Noir (2007) edited by Julie Smith (short stories by various authors)
- Off Magazine Street (2005) by Ronald Everett Capps, the basis for the 2004 film A Love Song for Bobby Long
- One More Last Dance (2017) by Jerry Antil
- The Ones Who Don't Say They Love Me (2021) by Maurice Carlos Ruffin
- Outside Child (2007) by Alice Wilson-Fried (Silver Medalist in the 2008 IPPY Awards)
- Paul Marchand, F.M.C. (1921) by Charles Chesnutt
- The Quarter Storm (2022) by Veronica Henry
- A Quiet Vendetta (2005) by R. J. Ellory
- Side Effects: A New Orleans Love Story by Patty Friedmann
- Skippers of Fortune Lafitte’s Gold (2025) by James Castellaw and Chris Brennan
- Tranquility Denied (2007) by novelist A. C. Frieden
- Twelfth Night by Michael Llewellyn
- Treasure Mountain (1972) by Louis Dearborn L'Amour
- Unmasked by Jody Gerbig
- Vampires of the French Quarter (2019) by Gilbert DuBose
- Violets and Other Tales (1895) and The Goodness of Saint Rocque and Other Stories (1899) by Alice Dunbar-Nelson
- Voodoo Dreams and Voodoo Season (1993) by Jewell Parker Rhodes
- A Walk on the Wild Side (1956) by Nelson Algren, the basis for the 1962 film Walk on the Wild Side
- We Cast a Shadow (2019) by Maurice Carlos Ruffin
- Zeitoun (2009) by Dave Eggers

== Comic books and graphic novels ==
- In the Marvel Comics fictional universe, New Orleans is the home city for the X-Man Gambit, as well as the guilds of Thieves and Assassins; as well as the leader of the latter guild, Bella Donna Boudreaux.
- The nonfiction webcomic A.D.: New Orleans After the Deluge is about six real-life residents of New Orleans and their experiences before, during, and after Hurricane Katrina.
- In the DC Comics fictional universe, New Orleans has been given a neighboring city, St. Roch, Louisiana, serving as an occasional home to the original Hawkman and Hawkgirl.
- The Marvel Comics heroine Monica Rambeau, known as Captain Marvel II and Photon, is from New Orleans.
- In the Marvel Max comic Hellstorm—Son of Satan, post-Katrina New Orleans is the setting.

== Film ==
New Orleans has served as the backdrop for a number of films with iconic turns in films such as Gone with the Wind (1939), A Streetcar Named Desire (1951), The Cincinnati Kid (1965), Live and Let Die (1973), Interview with the Vampire (1994), The Curious Case of Benjamin Button (2008), and The Princess and the Frog (2009). Films set in the city include:

- 12 Rounds (2009)
- Abbott and Costello Go to Mars (1953)
- Albino Alligator (1997)
- All Dogs Go to Heaven (1989)
- Angel Heart (1987)
- Arachnoquake (2012)
- Bad Lieutenant: Port of Call New Orleans (2009)
- Belle of the Nineties (1934)
- The Big Easy (1987)
- Blaze (1989)
- Blue Bayou (2021)
- The Buccaneer (1938) and The Buccaneer (1958)
- Candyman 2: Farewell to the Flesh (1995)
- Captain Marvel (2019)
- Cat People (1982)
- The Cincinnati Kid (1965; #1 film in U.S.)
- Città violenta (1970)
- The Client (1994)
- The Curious Case of Benjamin Button (2008)
- Déjà Vu (2006)
- Double Jeopardy (1999)
- Down by Law (1986)
- Dracula 2000 (2000)
- The Drowning Pool (1975)
- Easy Rider (1969; box office #1 film in the U.S.)
- The Family That Preys (2008)
- Father Hood (1993)
- The Flame of New Orleans (1941)
- Gone With the Wind (1939; #1 film in U.S.)
- Hard Target (1993)
- Hard Times (1975)
- Hatchet (2006)
- Hatchet II (2010)
- The Haunted Mansion (2003)
- Hell Baby (2013)
- Hurricane Season (2009)
- If God Is Willing and Da Creek Don't Rise (2010)
- Interview with the Vampire (1994; #1 film in U.S.)
- J. D.'s Revenge (1976)
- Jezebel (1938)
- JFK (1991)
- Johnny Handsome (1989)
- Judas Kiss (1998)
- Killing Them Softly (2012)
- King Creole (1958)
- Lady from Louisiana (1941)
- Last Holiday (2006)
- Let's Do It Again (1975)
- The Librarian: Curse of the Judas Chalice (2008)
- Live and Let Die (1973; #1 film in U.S.)
- A Love Song for Bobby Long (2004)
- A Murder of Crows (1999)
- New Orleans (1947)
- No Mercy (1986)
- Number One (1969)
- Obsession (1976)
- Panic in the Streets (1950)
- The Pelican Brief (1993; #1 film in U.S.)
- Point of No Return (1993)
- Pretty Baby (1978)
- The Princess and the Frog (2009, Disney; #1 film in U.S.)
- Project Power (2020)
- RED (2010)
- Ruby Bridges (1998)
- Runaway Jury (2003)
- Scooby-Doo on Zombie Island (1998)
- The Skeleton Key (2005)
- Sonny (2002)
- Storyville (1992)
- A Streetcar Named Desire (1951, 1984, 1995)
- Streets of Blood (2009)
- Tightrope (1984)
- The Toast of New Orleans (1950)
- Toys in the Attic (1963)
- Tune In Tomorrow (1990)
- Undercover Blues (1993)
- Vendetta (1999)
- Walk on the Wild Side (1963)
- When the Levees Broke: A Requiem in Four Acts (2006)
- Wild at Heart (1990)
- WUSA (1970)
- X-Men Origins: Wolverine (2009; #1 film in U.S.)
- Zandalee (1991)

== Plays and operas ==
New Orleans has been the setting of many works of theatre, most prominently perhaps are some of the plays of Tennessee Williams. Plays and operas set in the city include:

- A Streetcar Named Desire by Tennessee Williams (1947 play, winner of the 1948 Pulitzer Prize for drama)
- Vieux Carre (1977) by Tennessee Williams
- A Streetcar Named Desire, 1995 opera
- Manon Lescaut (1893), opera by Giacomo Puccini based on the Antoine François Prévost (Abbé Prévost) novel. The last scene (Act IV) is set in New Orleans, then a French colony, where Manon dies in Des Grieux's arms.

== Television ==
New Orleans has been the regular setting of several TV shows, the most prominent being David Simon's HBO series Treme, and has been featured in several others. TV shows include:

=== The Big Easy ===
USA network TV series (1996–97) adapted from the film of the same name.

=== Frank's Place ===
A CBS comedy-drama series that chronicled the life of Frank Parrish (Tim Reid), a well-to-do professor at Brown University, who inherits a New Orleans restaurant, Chez Louisiane. The series received the Television Critics Association award for outstanding comedy series in 1987, as well as an Emmy for best writing in a comedy series. However, it only lasted for one season (1987–88). Although set in New Orleans, the series was actually filmed in Los Angeles.

=== K-Ville ===
A short-lived crime series that debuted in 2007, which focused on the New Orleans police department in the aftermath of Hurricane Katrina. The series also centers around two New Orleans police detectives, Anthony Anderson as Marlin Boulet and Cole Hauser as Trevor Cobb, who were partners that "have conflicting ideas about how to handle the city's problems."

=== Longstreet ===
A crime drama series about a blind insurance investigator that was broadcast on the ABC in the 1971–1972 season. The series was set in New Orleans, but actually filmed in Los Angeles.

=== Orleans ===
This short-lived 1997 CBS series starring Larry Hagman was set in and partially filmed in New Orleans.

=== Treme ===
An American drama developed by David Simon that premiered in April 2010, Treme centers around residents of New Orleans, including musicians, chefs, Mardi Gras Indians, and ordinary New Orleanians trying to rebuild their lives, their homes and their unique culture in the aftermath of Hurricane Katrina. The series also explores New Orleans culture including and beyond the music scene to encompass political corruption, the public housing controversy, the criminal-justice system, clashes between police and Mardi Gras Indians, and the struggle to regain the tourism industry after the storm. The show is filmed on location in New Orleans and features both local actors in several roles in addition to a number of notable New Orleanians who appear as themselves.

=== NCIS: New Orleans ===
CBS series (2014–2021) starring Scott Bakula and Lucas Black.

=== Cloak and Dagger ===
Freeform series (2018–2019) starring Aubrey Joseph and Olivia Holt as Cloak and Dagger respectively. New Orleans serves as the main setting of the series and is also filmed and produced there.

=== The Originals ===
The Originals, a spin-off of The Vampire Diaries, is set in New Orleans and focuses on the Mikaelson family, a group of original vampires, and their dealings with the supernatural world in the city. While some scenes were filmed in New Orleans, many exteriors were filmed in Conyers, Georgia, particularly in the Olde Town Conyers area.

=== Coven Academy ===
Freeform series (2026–) starring Malina Weissman and Malachi Barton as teenage witches at a New Orleans boarding school. Filmed in Vancouver.

=== Other television references ===
Many television series have referenced the city:

- An episode of Jem and the Holograms was set in New Orleans.
- Season 9 (2000) of The Real World was set in New Orleans. Season 24 (2010) of The Real World was also set in New Orleans.
- In a 2001 episode of Seven Days, Parker goes to New Orleans to prove that his friend, who is scheduled to be executed, is innocent.
- In a 2003 episode of The Drew Carey Show, Drew and his buddies set off on a road trip to New Orleans to find a girl he met after placing an ad on a beer bottle.
- In a 2004 episode of Las Vegas called "New Orleans", Danny, Ed and Sam head to New Orleans in search of a big gambler who owes the casino money.
- In a 2005 episode of Law and Order: Special Victims Unit, the detectives pursue a child molester who kidnapped three young sisters from New Orleans after their parents were killed in the aftermath of Hurricane Katrina.
- In a 2005 episode of Bones, Dr. Temperance Brennen and Agent Seeley Booth head to New Orleans to help identify bodies found after Hurricane Katrina. The plot revolves heavily around the underground voodoo practices in the city.
- In a 2006 episode of House called "Who's Your Daddy?". House deals with patient who is the daughter of an old college roommate and is having hallucinations after having survived an ordeal resulting from Hurricane Katrina.
- In a 2007 episode of Boston Legal, Denny Crane and Alan Shore visit New Orleans to defend a doctor accused of euthanizing patients.
- Monica Dawson a character on the NBC television series Heroes lives in New Orleans. Her parents were killed in Hurricane Katrina.
- The X-Files character Monica Reyes worked for the FBI in New Orleans before becoming John Doggett's partner.
- New Orleans is the setting of The Simpsons spin-off, Chief Wiggum P.I., starring Chief Wiggum, as well as the setting for Oh! Streetcar!, a musical version of A Streetcar Named Desire featured on another episode of the show. The titular family visits New Orleans in "Lisa Sings the Blues".
- Star Trek: Deep Space Nine character Benjamin Sisko is a native of New Orleans. His father Joseph Sisko is also a native of New Orleans, and has a restaurant near Jackson Square in the 2370s. The family restaurant is seen in the episodes "Homefront", "Paradise Lost", "Tears of the Prophets", "Image in the Sand" and Shadows and Symbols". Other episodes to be set in New Orleans include "The Visitor". New Orleans is also mentioned in the episodes "Equilibrium", "Explorers", "Family Business" and "What You Leave Behind". The New Orleans class starship is named for the city.
- The Curb Your Enthusiasm character Leon Black was a native resident of New Orleans before moving in with Larry David after Katrina.
- In Season 4 Episode 8 of The Vampire Diaries, Stefan and Damon visit New Orleans. Again in Episode 20, Klaus visits New Orleans when he hears there are plans brewing against him. New Orleans is also the primary setting of the spin-off series The Originals.
- The third season of American Horror Story, American Horror Story: Coven, is set in New Orleans.
- In What's New, Scooby-Doo?, the episode "Big Scare in the Big Easy" takes place in New Orleans, where two Civil War ghosts re-enact a duel every night to scare away guests.
- In The Looney Tunes Show, the New Orleans airport had a cameo in the episode "Spread Those Wings and Fly", when Daffy was working as a flight attendant.
- The Ben 10 episode "Lucky Girl" takes place in New Orleans.
- In Monsters and Mysteries in America, New Orleans was featured in the first season's fifth episode where people claim to see vampires out and about.

== Video games ==
- Red Dead Redemption 2, the third installment of Red Dead series. The city of Saint Denis is based on 1899 New Orleans.
- Crash Bandicoot 4: It's About Time the level "Off Beat" is set in New Orleans during Mardi Gras.
- Mafia 3, the third installment of the Mafia titled crime games. The game takes place in New Bordeaux, which is a fictionalised version of New Orleans in the 1960s.
- The Adventures of Bayou Billy, a 1989 Crocodile Dundee imitation with a similar character from Louisiana; final stages take place on Bourbon Street
- Assassin's Creed III: Liberation, takes place in 18th-century New Orleans.
- The Colonel's Bequest, a 1989 adventure game whose protagonist is a Tulane student in 1925
- Gabriel Knight: Sins of the Fathers, a 1993 adventure game for PC, set in New Orleans
- Hitman: Blood Money, contains the level "Murder of Crows," set in New Orleans
- Infamous 2 takes place in New Marais, a fictional city taking inspirations from New Orleans
- James Bond 007: Everything or Nothing, partly set in New Orleans
- Left 4 Dead 2 takes place in the Deep South, with the last campaign (The Parish) taking place in New Orleans
- Nancy Drew: Legend of the Crystal Skull, the 17th game in the Nancy Drew video game series, takes place in New Orleans
- Sherlock Holmes: The Awakened contains investigations in New Orleans
- Tony Hawk's Underground 2, skateboarding game, features New Orleans as one of its stages
- Voodoo Vince, takes place in New Orleans
- Gangster New Orleans, Android game. takes place in New Orleans.
- Call of Duty: Modern Warfare 3 features the French Quarter during a fictional World War III. Delta Force fights against the Russian Spetsnaz and the map features a fictional Catholic Church in place of St. Louis Cathedral.
- Wolfenstein 2: The New Colossus features New Orleans as a location. The player heads to the city to help a resistance group who is fighting against the Nazis.

== See also ==
- New Orleans Square
