= Sam Shearon =

British Dark Artist (born 1978)

Mister Sam Shearon
- Born: 15 March 1978 (age 48); Liverpool, England
- Education: Bachelor of Arts with Honours; University of Leeds, West Yorkshire, England & Post Graduate Certificate in Education. Huddersfield University, England

Sam Shearon (born 15 March 1978), also known under the pseudonym and credited / published also as Mister Sam Shearon is a British dark artist born in Liverpool, England. Specialising in horror and science-fiction, his work often includes elements inspired by vintage tales of monsters and madmen, dark futures, post apocalyptic genres including cyberpunk and industrial wastelands and classic literature including H.P.Lovecraft's The Call of Cthulhu, Oscar Wilde's The Picture of Dorian Gray and the modern classics Clive Barker's Hellraiser and the Books of Blood all of which he has fully illustrated.

Shearon's main influences stem from ancient cultures, the occult, industrial/art/revolution-eras, the supernatural, the paranormal, cryptozoology and the unexplained. Shearon has created covers for comic books and graphic novels including Clive Barker's HELLRAISER, Judge Dredd, The X-Files, Mars Attacks, 30 Days of Night, Angel, KISS, and Clive Barker's Books of Blood, Stan Lee's 'Lucky Man' and album sleeve artwork and merchandise designs for some of the biggest names in rock, metal and industrial music, such as Godhead, Ministry, Rob Zombie, Iron Maiden, Slayer, H.I.M, Kiss, Doyle Wolfgang von Frankenstein, Powerman 5000, Biohazard, American Head Charge, Rammstein, Jason Charles Miller , Fear Factory , Orgy, Fitler, Cradle of filth, and Kill Devil Hill.

== Biography ==
Shearon studied at the University of Leeds in the College of Art & Design, West Yorkshire, England. He was awarded a Bachelor of Arts Degree with Honours in 2000 for Visual Communication. Shortly after, he went on to become a qualified Art teacher gaining a Post Graduate Certificate in Education from Huddersfield University. His first solo exhibition entitled "A Walk on the Darkside" in 2003, featured forty five pieces of his original artwork including 6-foot-tall (1.8 m) demonic statues, biomechanical monsters and giant canvases depicting images of horror and the macabre. The exhibition was featured in various national newspapers including The Daily Telegraph as well as BBC Radio One and live interviews on BBC Radio Leeds North. The show attracted protests and boycotts over its inclusion of animal bones, and the mutilation and disembowelment of children's toys, but the show was extended to six weeks due to popular demand.

His work has been described by the British press as "bizarre", "grotesque" "gruesome", and "groundbreaking". Shearon is known for his work in the field of cryptozoology, most notably for compiling artists impressions, of the Beast of Lytham from eyewitness accounts. Shearon's cryptozoological art was on display at the 2005 Weird Weekend, an annual conference at the Centre for Fortean Zoology. His work can be found in publications of the Fortean Times, Paranormal Magazine as well as the cover artwork for IDW Comics for the Angel series, 30 Days of Night, The X-Files, Alan Roberts Wire Hangers, H.P.Lovecraft's The Call of Cthulhu, KISS, Mars Attacks, Judge Dredd, Hellraiser and Clive Barker's Books of Bloodand also horror magazine Fangoria's Trinity of Terrors. Shearon provided cover art for the official collectors programme to a Halloween weekend event featuring the rock/metal band Slipknot depicting a portrayal of their lead singer Corey Taylor.

Shearon has created artwork for a variety of rock and metal music related clients including Jason Charles Miller, Godhead: At the Edge of the World, Mina Caputo, Ryan Oldcastle, HIM, Shane Gibson's stOrk featuring Thomas Lang, A Pale Horse Named Death – (featuring members of both Type O Negative and Life of Agony), Iron Maiden, Fear Factory, Rammstein, Biohazard, Black Water Rising, Ministry, Kill Devil Hill, Powerman 5000, American Head Charge and Rob Zombie. Shearon's artwork can also be found in the form of graphics on the bodies of guitars, carry cases, drum skins and merchandise. Clients include Pro Tone Pedals, Coffin Case, ESP Guitars, Dean Guitars and Schecter Guitar Research.

== Artwork credits ==
=== Music albums ===
- 2008: Godhead – At the Edge of the World
- 2008: Mina Caputo – Dass Berdache
- 2008: Ryan Oldcastle – Patience Seeds
- 2009: Black Water Rising – Black Water Rising
- 2009: Godhead – The Early Years
- 2010: Rob Zombie – Hellbilly Deluxe 2
- 2010: stOrk – stOrk
- 2010: A Pale Horse Named Death – And Hell Will Follow Me
- 2011: Indestructible Noise Command – Heaven Sent... Hellbound
- 2011: PLUG-IN – HIJACK
- 2011: Crowned By Fire – Prone To Destroy
- 2012: Jason Charles Miller – Uncountry
- 2012: Biohazard – Reborn in Defiance
- 2012: September Mourning – Melancholia
- 2012: WRENCH – Dry Heaves & Tears
- 2012: Jason Charles Miller – Natural Born Killer
- 2012: The Dark – Teenage Angst
- 2012: Arise in Chaos – Civilization Decay
- 2013: American Head Charge – Shoot
- 2013: A Pale Horse Named Death – Lay My Soul to Waste
- 2013: stOrk – Broken Pieces
- 2013: Crowned By Fire – Space Music For Cave People
- 2013: Ministry – From Beer To Eternity
- 2013: Kill Devil Hill – Revolution Rise
- 2014: Ministry – Last Tangle In Paris
- 2014: Powerman 5000 – Builders of the Future
- 2014: Judgemental – Empires Fall
- 2014: Indestructible Noise Command – Black Hearse Serenade
- 2015: SOSRA – DEMO-Lition
- 2015: RUNE – Self-Titled
- 2015: Karnival Korpus – Lynch
- 2015: KREEP – One Nation Under
- 2015: Despite Loyalty – Come Burn With Me
- 2016: Arise in Chaos – Terminal Cognition
- 2016: Anti-clone – The Root of Man
- 2016: American Head Charge – Tango Umbrella
- 2016: King Creature – Down in Flames
- 2016: The Greatest Fear – Title TBD
- 2016: Karnival Korpus – HOGOS / House of Glass On Stone
- 2016: Arise in Chaos – Terminal Cognition
- 2016: Karnival Korpus – The Liar
- 2016: Flatliner – Pale Blue
- 2017: La Fin Absolute Du Mond – Killing The Host
- 2017: King Creature – Volume One
- 2017: INVIDIA – As The Sun Sleeps
- 2017: Meatspace – Title TBD
- 2017: Motograter – Desolation
- 2017: A Killer's Confession – Unbroken
- 2017: DOYLE – Doyle II: As We Die
- 2017: Mark Slaughter – Halfway There
- 2017: Northern Light Orchestra – Star of the East
- 2018: MINISTRY – AMERIKKKANT
- 2018: JASON CHARLES MILLER – IN THE WASTELAND
- 2018: Grim Demise – Watchers of the Dying Earth
- 2019: A Pale Horse Named Death – When The World Becomes Undone
- 2019: Orgy
- 2019: Last Machine Operation - Invitation to the World
- 2020: Jason Charles Miller - FROM THE WRECKAGE PART ONE
- 2020: FILTER - MURICA
- 2020: King Tuts Tomb - TIME TO GO
- 2021: Jason Charles Miller - FROM THE WRECKAGE PART TWO
- 2022: KILL DEVIL HILL – Blood in the Water
- 2022: FILTER - For The Beaten
- 2022: Andy Biersack - Andy Biersack presents The Works of Edgar Allan Poe
- 2023: Jason Charles Miller - Wasted Years
- 2023: Jason Charles Miller - Cards On the Table
- 2023: KILL DEVIL HILL – TBD
- 2023: FILTER - Face Down
- 2023: FILTER - The Algorithm

=== Book Covers ===
- 2013: Strange Intruders - by David Weatherly - Cover artwork by Sam Shearon.
- 2015: The Gringo Maniac Murder Spree - by Joshua P Warren - Cover artwork by Sam Shearon.
- 2016: Wood Knocks Volume 1: A Journal of Sasquatch Research - by David Weatherly - Cover artwork by Sam Shearon.
- 2016: Creepy Christmas - by Mister Sam Shearon - Cover & interior artwork by Sam Shearon.
- 2017: Wood Knocks Volume 2: A Journal of Sasquatch Research - by David Weatherly - Cover artwork by Sam Shearon.
- 2017: Blackwell (The Prequel - A Magnus Blackwell Novel Book 1) - by Alexandrea Weis and Lucas Astor - Cover artwork by Sam Shearon.
- 2017: Damned (A Magnus Blackwell Novel Book 2) - by Alexandrea Weis and Lucas Astor - Cover artwork by Sam Shearon.
- 2018: Bound (The Prequel - A Magnus Blackwell Novel Book 3) - by Alexandrea Weis and Lucas Astor - Cover artwork by Sam Shearon.
- 2018: Wood Knocks Volume 3: A Journal of Sasquatch Research - by David Weatherly - Cover artwork by Sam Shearon.
- 2018: Jaclyn and the Beanstalk: A Tangled Fairy Tale - by Mary Ting - Cover artwork by Sam Shearon.
- 2018: Jinxed (Jinxed Trilogy Book 1) - by Thommy Hutson - Cover artwork by Sam Shearon.
- 2018: Beneath the Lighthouse (Book 1) - by Julieanne Lynch - Cover artwork by Sam Shearon.
- 2018: The Immortal Gene - by Jonas Saul - Cover artwork by Sam Shearon.
- 2018: The Royal Order of Fighting Dragons' (Book 1) - by Dan Elish - Cover artwork by Sam Shearon.
- 2018: The Journal of Angela Ashby - by Liana Gardner - Cover artwork by Sam Shearon.
- 2018: Bigfoot Nation: The History of Sasquatch in North America' - by David Childress - Cover artwork by Sam Shearon.
- 2018: Thieves in the Night: A Brief History of Supernatural Child Abductions - by Joshua Cutchin - Cover artwork by Sam Shearon.
- 2019: Seize (The Prequel - A Magnus Blackwell Novel Book 4) - by Alexandrea Weis and Lucas Astor - Cover artwork by Sam Shearon.
- 2019: Black Eyed Children Revised 2nd Edition - by David Weatherly - Cover artwork by Sam Shearon.
- 2019: Eerie Companions (A History of Haunted Dolls) - by David Weatherly - Cover artwork by Sam Shearon.
- 2019: Silver State Monsters: Cryptids & Legends of Nevada - (Monsters of America) by David Weatherly - Foreword by Lyle Blackburn - Cover artwork by Sam Shearon.
- 2019: Copper State Monsters: Cryptids & Legends of Arizona - (Monsters of America) by David Weatherly - Foreword by Ken Gerhard - Cover artwork by Sam Shearon.
- 2020: Monsters of the Last Frontier: Cryptids & Legends of Alaska - (Monsters of America) by David Weatherly - Foreword by Ken Gerhard - Cover artwork by Sam Shearon.
- 2020: Wood Knocks Volume 4: A Journal of Sasquatch Research - by David Weatherly - Cover artwork by Sam Shearon.
- 2020: Monsters at the Crossroads: Cryptids & Legends of Indiana - (Monsters of America) by David Weatherly - Foreword by Chad Lewis - Cover artwork by Sam Shearon.
- 2020: Monsters at the Tar Heel State: Cryptids & Legends of North Carolina - (Monsters of America) by David Weatherly - Foreword by Joshua P Warren - Cover artwork by Sam Shearon.
- 2021: Ghosts, UFOs & Legends of Death Valley - by Joshua P. Warren - Cover & interior artwork by Sam Shearon.
- 2021: Wood Knocks Volume 5: A Journal of Sasquatch Research - by David Weatherly - Cover artwork by Sam Shearon.
- 2021: Peach State Monsters: Cryptids & Legends of Georgia - (Monsters of America) by David Weatherly - Foreword by Joshua Cutchin - Cover artwork by Sam Shearon.
- 2020: Monsters of Big Sky Country: Cryptids & Legends of Montana - (Monsters of America) by David Weatherly - Foreword by John Lemay - Cover artwork by Sam Shearon.
- 2020: The Essential Guide to Bigfoot - by Ken Gerhard - Foreword by Peter Byrne - Cover artwork by Sam Shearon.
- 2020: The Essential Guide to the Loch Ness Monster & Other Aquatic Cryptids - by Ken Gerhard - Foreword by Steve Feltham - Cover artwork by Sam Shearon.
- 2021: Palmetto State Monsters: Cryptids & Legends of South Carolina (Monsters of America) by David Weatherly - Foreword by Micah Hanks - Cover artwork by Sam Shearon.
- 2022: Monsters of the Hawkeye State: Cryptids & Legends of Iowa (Monsters of America) by David Weatherly - Foreword by Kevin Lee Nelson - Cover artwork by Sam Shearon.
- 2022: Beehive State Monsters: Cryptids & Legends of Utah (Monsters of America) by David Weatherly - Foreword by David J West - Cover artwork by Sam Shearon.
- 2022: Monsters of the Hawkeye State: Cryptids & Legends of Iowa (Monsters of America) by David Weatherly - Foreword by Kevin Lee Nelson - Cover artwork by Sam Shearon.
- 2022: Monsters of the Sunshine State: Cryptids & Legends of Florida (Monsters of America) by David Weatherly - Foreword by Robert Robinson - Cover artwork by Sam Shearon.
- 2022: River of Ashes (A St. Benedict Novel Book 1) - by Alexandrea Weis and Lucas Astor - Cover artwork by Sam Shearon.
- 2023: Monsters of the Pine Tree State: Cryptids & Legends of Maine (Monsters of America) by David Weatherly - Foreword by Loren Coleman - Cover artwork by Sam Shearon.
- 2023: Lone Star State Monsters: Cryptids & Legends of Texas (Monsters of America) by David Weatherly - Foreword by Nick Redfern - Cover artwork by Sam Shearon.
- 2023: River of Wrath (A St. Benedict Novel Book 2) - by Alexandrea Weis and Lucas Astor - Cover artwork by Sam Shearon.
- 2023: River of Ghosts (A St. Benedict Novel Book 3) - by Alexandrea Weis and Lucas Astor - Cover artwork by Sam Shearon.
- 2023: Merbeings: The True story of Mermaids, Mermen and Lizardfolk - by Mark A Hall and Loren Coleman - Cover artwork by Sam Shearon.

=== Comics & graphic novels ===
- IDW Publishing
  - 2009: 'ANGEL' – Landau/Lynch/Urru – comic (Issue 24 – 3 X Limited Edition cover artworks).
  - 2010: 'Wire Hangers' Alan Robert comic (Issue 4 – cover artwork).
  - 2010: 'Wire Hangers' Alan Robert Graphic Novel / Full series collection. (cover artwork).
  - 2011: '30 Days of Night' – Infestation 2 – 'Cthulhu-styled' cover.
  - 2012: 'The Secret Battles of Genghis Khan' – cover.
  - 2012: 'H.P.Lovecraft' – 'The Call of Cthulhu and other Mythos Tales' – Cover & 20+ Illustrations.
  - 2012: 'Oscar Wilde' – 'The Picture of Dorian Gray' – Cover & 20+ Illustrations.
  - 2012: 'KISS' – 'Kiss Girls' – two variant covers.
  - 2012: 'KISS' – 'Kiss Meets the Phantom of the Park' – Cover Artwork.
  - 2012: 'KISS' – Greatest Hits Volume 3 – (cover artwork).
  - 2013: 'KISS' – Greatest Hits Volume 4 – (cover artwork).
  - 2013: 'KISS' – Greatest Hits Volume 5 – (cover artwork).
  - 2013: 'Mars Attacks' – 'Beast and the Beauty'. (cover artwork).
  - 2013: 'The X-Files' – Classics Volume 1 – (Cover Artwork).
  - 2013: 'The X-Files' – Classics Volume 2 – (Cover Artwork).
  - 2013: 'The Other Dead' – Issue 3 – (Cover Artwork).
  - 2014: 'The Other Dead' – Issue 5 – (Cover Artwork).
  - 2014: 'The Other Dead' – Issue 6 – (Cover Artwork).
  - 2014: 'The X-Files' – Classics Volume 3 – (Cover Artwork).
  - 2014: 'The X-Files' – Classics Volume 4 – (Cover Artwork).
  - 2014: 'The X-Files' – Annual – (Exorcist) – (Cover Artwork).
  - 2015: 'Judge Dredd' – Classics – (The Four Dark Judges - Four Issues) – (Cover Artwork).
  - 2015: 'The X-Files' – Annual – (Ground Zero) – (Cover Artwork).
  - 2015: 'Thunder Agents' – (Cover Artwork).
  - 2016: 'Richard Matheson' – Master of Horror – (Cover Artwork).
  - 2017: 'Aleister Arcane' – Collection – (Cover Artwork).
- BOOM! Studios
  - 2014: Clive Barker's 'Hellraiser' – Bestiary Issue 1 – (Cover Artwork).

Madefire / Seraphim Ink

  - 2014: Clive Barker's 'Books of Blood' – Issue 1: 'The book of Blood' (Full Interior & Cover Artwork).
- IMAGE comics
  - 2022: 'Liam Sharp's STARHENGE' - issue SIX - book one – (Cover Artwork).
- Opus Publishing
  - 2022: 'Cradle of Filth' - issue FIVE - (Cover Artwork).

=== Guitar graphics ===
- ESP Guitars
  - 2008: Cobweb & Redburn TWO EC Graphic guitars
  - 2009: Clockwork Zombie Series 1 & 2 (SOLD OUT) SIX graphic guitars models-( EC, Viper, EX)
  - 2013: Vampire Bio-Tech THREE graphic guitars models-(EC, Viper, M).
- Cort Guitars
  - 2008: Steamborg Assinator - acoustic / hard body / engraved. (As used by Emmanuel Nwamadi on the television show The Voice UK).
  - 2008: Cort X series (X-2 SA, X-6 SA)
- Dean Guitars
  - 2011: Dave Mustaine – Megadeth American Flag – 'Mako' – 'GLORY' Signature Acoustic Guitar Graphic.
  - 2011: Michael Angelo Batio – Light-Speed – Guitar Graphic.
  - 2011: Dimebag 'X-RAY' – Razorback – Guitar Graphic.
- Schecter Guitar Research
  - 2012: Gary Holt – 'Exodus' / 'Slayer' – Flying 'V' Guitar Graphic.

=== Guitar cases – CoffinCase ===
- CoffinCase
- 2009: Maila Nurmi 'VAMPIRA' Memorial Portrait CoffinCase.
- 2009: TKL Cases: 'The Beast'.

=== Merchandise and tour shirt designs ===
- 2007: Iron Maiden: 'Somewhere Back in Time' World Tour Scarab Image.
- 2007: HIM : Various T-shirt Designs.
- 2008: Godhead : At the Edge of the World T-shirt Designs.
- 2008: Mina Caputo : Hearts Blood / Das Berdache.
- 2009: Cradle of Filth : Various T-shirt Designs.
- 2010: Fear Factory : Various T-shirt Designs.
- 2010: Jason Charles Miller : The Devil T-shirt Design.
- 2010: Rob Zombie : Hellbilly Deluxe 2 – Portrait / T-shirt Design.
- 2011: A Pale Horse Named Death : And Hell Will Follow Me : T-shirt Design.
- 2011: Rammstein – Tour Merchandise.
- 2012: Rammstein – Tour Merchandise.
- 2012: Many of Odd Nature – Tour Merchandise.
- 2012: Slaves on Dope – Summer Tour Merchandise.
- 2012: Jason Charles Miller : Natural Born Killer.
- 2013: American Head Charge
- 2013: A Pale Horse Named Death : Lay My Soul to Waste : T-shirt Design.
- 2016: Jason Charles Miller : Brother of Bigfoot.
- 2016: Jason Charles Miller : Child of the Chupacabra.
- 2018: Jason Charles Miller : In The Wasteland.
- 2020: Jason Charles Miller : From The Wreckage.

=== Other credits ===
- 2007: Mina Caputo : European Tour Poster for 'Hearts Blood on your Dawn'.
- 2008: Mina Caputo : European Tour Poster for 'A Fondness for Hometown Scars'.
- 2008: SCUZZ – Sky network Rock/Metal music channel.
- 2009: FANGORIA : 'Trinity of Terrors' 3 Day Halloween event in Las Vegas – Featuring Slipknot: Programme/booklet cover artwork.
- 2010: Devolution Magazine : Official Cover logo.
- 2010: Monsters of Comedy : Tour Poster/Merch Designs : Tour fronted by Jason Rouse.
- 2011: A Pale Horse Named Death & Seventh Void : European Tour Poster for their debut album release.
- 2013: Zulu Tattoo L.A. : 'Zulu Lounge' Charity Event – Flyers / Posters / Banners / Portraits / T-shirt designs.
- 2014: Ministry : 'NEW DAWN' Logo Design.
- 2015: Pandie James 'Seraphim Song' Book Cover Design.
- 2017: STAN LEE's POW ENTERTAINMENT - LUCKY MAN TV Show story boards and art direction.
- 2018: Slayer - Final World Tour : Tour Poster Designs.
- 2019: Slayer - Final World Tour : Tour Poster Designs.
