= Hellbilly Deluxe 2 World Tour =

2009–12 concert tour by Rob Zombie

- World tour by Rob Zombie
- Promotional poster for Rob Zombie's performance in Melbourne
- Location: Japan; United States; Canada; Europe; Australia
- Associated album: Hellbilly Deluxe 2
- Start date: October 15, 2009
- End date: May 26, 2012
- Legs: 13
- No. of shows: 150 (+ 5 cancelled)

The Hellbilly Deluxe 2 World Tour was a worldwide concert tour by American rock band Rob Zombie that began in October 2009 in support of his fourth studio album Hellbilly Deluxe 2. The tour consisted of 12 legs spanning across Japan, North America, Europe and Australia. The tour marked the first time Zombie has performed internationally since the beginning of his solo career.

== Overview ==
After the completion of the Hellbilly Deluxe 2 recording sessions, Zombie announced that his live band and himself were heading to Japan to co-headline the Loudpark Festival in Chiba on October 18, 2009, preceded by two headlining performance in Tokyo and Osaka. The performances debuted several songs from the upcoming record and marked Zombie's first ever solo appearances in the country.

Tommy Clufetos left the band shortly after the release of Hellbilly Deluxe 2

After returning from Japan, Zombie embarked on a tour of North America, dubbed The Hellbilly Deluxe 2 Tour despite the album being several months from release. Nekromantix and Captain Clegg & the Night Creatures, the fictional band from Halloween II, served as the opening acts for all dates. Another fictional character from the film, Uncle Seymour Coffins, hosted the Los Angeles show on Halloween. The tour supported Zombie's unreleased album of the same name. The tour spanned from late October to early December. It was also the last leg of the tour to feature Tommy Clufetos on drums who left the band after the release of Hellbilly Deluxe 2 to join Ozzy Osbourne.

After months of silence from the band and Zombie himself, it was announced in early March that drummer Tommy Clufetos had left the group to join Ozzy Osbourne. Shortly after, it was announced that he had been replaced by Slipknot drummer Joey Jordison.

Zombie had expressed interest in touring with Alice Cooper for 15 years. The two united to create the Gruesome Twosome Tour, which spanned 17 co-headlining dates across North America. "The tour worked brilliantly and I'd love to do more of it," enthused Alice, "but it's a case of schedules. It took long enough to get those dates together."

In addition, Zombie performed three festival dates and performed at the Revolver Golden Gods Awards ceremony. The Gruesome Twosome tour was Zombie's first to feature Joey Jordison, who replaced Tommy Clufetos. The tour began to incorporate a new stage setting and use of theatrics, much similar to Zombie's earlier tours. The band also filmed the video for Mars Needs Women during this leg of the tour.

Rob Zombie & Alice Cooper performing live in Toronto on the Gruesome Twosome tour

After the culmination of the Gruesome Twosome tour, the band took a short break as Jordison returned to his primary project, the Murderdolls. The band was announced to be co-headlining the 2010 iteration of Mayhem Festival with Korn. The festival marked the first time the two bands have toured with each other in 11 years. The tour spanned 26 dates across the United States and Canada. The tour began on July 10 and concluded on August 14. The band also scheduled signings at the Roadrunner tent on every stop of the tour. During the opening date in San Bernardino, the band were criticised for performing Werewolf Women of the SS, which featured swastikas on the stage video screens. They dropped the song for the remaining dates of the festival. While performing in North Carolina, John 5 jumped off a riser and broke his foot. Despite the injury, he continued to perform and finish the set. He stated that this incident will not prevent him from performing the rest of the tour.

While in Mountain View, California, a local San Francisco radio station conducted an interview with Joey Jordison. During this interview, Jordison announced that Rob Zombie, Alice Cooper and Jordison's current band the Murderdolls will be touring together in the same manner as Zombie and Cooper's previous tour, The Gruesome Twosome tour. The upcoming tour has been dubbed the Halloween Hootenanny tour. Jordison also stated that he will be performing double duties on the tour, drumming for Zombie and playing rhythm guitar for the Murderdolls. Zombie had also previously announced in an interview conducted while on the Mayhem Festival that he was going to be embarking on a Halloween tour, but no more details were revealed. John 5 and Zombie both later confirmed the tour on their Twitter pages. Tour dates were slowly revealed through Zombie's official website.

While on the road with the Mayhem Festival, both Rob Zombie and John 5 confirmed that the band will be embarking on a tour of Europe after the completion of the Halloween Hootenanny Tour with Alice Cooper. This was later simplified down into a tour of the United Kingdom rather than the whole of Europe. John 5 recently confirmed in an interview, for the purpose of promoting the band's appearance at the Soundwave Festival in Australia, that the band will begin their tour of the UK before embarking on their Australian leg of the tour. Several dates spanning across the UK were confirmed through Zombie's official website. The band will be supported by labelmates Skindred and Revoker.

The band again took a short break after the completion of the Mayhem Festival as Jordison once again returned to perform with the Murderdolls in Europe. Upon his return from Europe, he returned to perform with Zombie who had once again teamed up with Alice Cooper for the Halloween Hootenanny tour, a co-headlining tour which would also be supported by the Murderdolls. Jordison performed double duties on the tour, drumming for Zombie and playing guitar for the Murderdolls. Black Label Society, Children of Bodom and Clutch supported Zombie and Cooper on October 17 by merging the Black Label Berzerkus Tour with the Halloween Hootenanny Tour for one night only.

Zombie then took the rest of the year off to work on his upcoming film, the Lords of Salem. After the completion of the script, Zombie performed three small club shows in the United States in early February before heading to the United Kingdom and Australia. A show originally planned in Reno, Nevada was cancelled due to illness. Jordison was unable to perform these dates as he was touring in Europe with the Murderdolls at the time. Zombie recruited former Marilyn Manson drummer Ginger Fish to sit in for Jordison for the shows. Zombie then returned to the United Kingdom for the first time in 12 years for a tour that completely sold out in record time.

A day before the first announcement of bands scheduled to perform at the Soundwave Festival in Australia was due to be announced, the entire line-up was leaked onto the internet which featured Rob Zombie among with many other artists. Iron Maiden, Queens of the Stone Age and One Day as a Lion are set to headline the event which Zombie will co-headline with Slash, Primus, Thirty Seconds To Mars, Slayer, Stone Sour, Avenged Sevenfold, Bullet for my Valentine, Social Distortion and others. Joey Jordison's current band, the Murderdolls, are also scheduled to perform at the festival. He will be performing double duty with Zombie and the Murderdolls in the same manner as the Halloween Hootenanny Tour.

Zombie then travelled to Australia for his first ever solo tour in the country to co-headline the Soundwave Festival alongside bands such as the Murderdolls, Iron Maiden, Queens of the Stone Age, Slayer and others. Drummer Joey Jordison performed double-duty with Zombie and the Murderdolls, similar to the Halloween Hootenanny Tour. He had stated during an interview that he would return with his band within the next couple of years for a headlining tour of his own. Jordison left the band at the end of this leg to return his focus on the Murderdolls before returning to Slipknot later in the year. Ginger Fish, who had previously filled in for Jordison on drumming duties, was announced as his permanent replacement.

Zombie embarked on a second leg of Europe in June consisting of many festival appearances and headlining performances. The band received support from Wayne Static and Loaded (select dates) for this leg of the tour. Zombie used a scaled down production for all of the European tour dates except for his headlining performance at the Download Festival which featured use of his well renowned pyrotechnics, video displays and stage props. The last 5 dates of the tour were cancelled for personal reasons, the latter being that the band needed to return to the United States. Zombie will then return to North America for a co-headlining tour with Slayer and supported by Exodus.

== Tour dates ==
Date	City	Country	Venue
Asia
October 15, 2009	Tokyo	Japan	Studio Coast
October 16, 2009	Osaka	Japan	Namba Hatch
With: Slayer, Children of Bodom, Papa Roach and others
October 18, 2009	Chiba	Japan	Loud Park Festival
North America, Leg No. 1 Supported by: Nekromantix and Captain Clegg & The Night Creatures
October 29, 2009	Phoenix	United States	Dodge Theatre
October 30, 2009	Paradise	United States	Pearl Concert Theater
October 31, 2009	Los Angeles	United States	Hollywood Palladium
November 1, 2009	Anaheim	United States	The Grove of Anaheim
November 3, 2009	San Jose	United States	San Jose Events Centre
November 5, 2009	Magna	United States	The Great Salt Air Theatre
November 6, 2009	Denver	United States	The Fillmore
November 8, 2009	Tulsa	United States	The Brady Theater
November 10, 2009	Austin	United States	Austin Music Hall
November 11, 2009	Houston	United States	Verizon Wireless Theater
November 13, 2009	Dallas	United States	Palladium Ballroom
November 14, 2009	Kansas City	United States	Uptown Theater
November 15, 2009	St. Louis	United States	The Pageant
November 16, 2009	Indianapolis	United States	Murat Theater
November 17, 2009	Akron	United States	Akron Civic Centre
November 19, 2009	Milwaukee	United States	Eagles Ballroom
November 20, 2009	Saint Paul	United States	Roy Wilkins Auditorium
November 21, 2009	Des Moines	United States	Val Air Ballroom
November 22, 2009	Chicago	United States	Aragon Ballroom
November 24, 2009	Louisville	United States	Broadbent Arena
November 25, 2009	Columbus	United States	The LC Pavilion
November 27, 2009	Detroit	United States	The Fillmore Detroit
November 28, 2009	Toronto	Canada	The Sound Academy
November 29, 2009	Montreal	Canada	Métropolis
December 1, 2009	New York City	United States	Hammerstein Ballroom
December 2, 2009	Boston	United States	House of Blues
December 3, 2009	Uncasville	United States	Mohegan Sun Arena
December 4, 2009	Philadelphia	United States	Electric Factory
December 5, 2009	Washington, D.C.	United States	9:30 Club
North America, Leg No. 2
Co-Headlining with: Alice Cooper
April 8, 2010	Los Angeles	United States	Nokia Theatre^{[1]}
April 26, 2010	Winnipeg	Canada	MTS Centre
April 27, 2010	Saskatoon	Canada	Credit Union Centre
April 28, 2010	Edmonton	Canada	Rexall Place
April 29, 2010	Calgary	Canada	Stampede Corral
May 1, 2010	Vancouver	Canada	Pacific Coliseum
May 2, 2010	Kennewick	United States	Toyota Center
May 4, 2010	Billings	United States	MetraPark Arena
May 5, 2010	Casper	United States	Casper Events Center
May 7, 2010	Springfield	United States	Shrine Mosque Auditorium
With: Godsmack, Seether, Papa Roach and others
May 8, 2010	Little Rock	United States	North Shore Riverwalk ^{[2]}
Co-Headlining with: Alice Cooper
May 9, 2010	Park City	United States	Hartman Arena
May 11, 2010	Rochester	United States	Mayo Civic Center
May 12, 2010	Duluth	United States	Duluth Entertainment Convention Center
With: Three Days Grace, Godsmack, Alice Cooper and others
May 14, 2010	Council Bluffs	United States	Indianola Balloon Grounds ^{[2]}
Co-Headlining with: Alice Cooper"|
May 15, 2010	Kearney	United States	Viaero Event Center
May 18, 2010	Knoxville	United States	James White Civic Coliseum
May 19, 2010	Charlotte	United States	Uptown Amphitheatre
May 21, 2010	Toronto	Canada	Molson Amphitheatre
May 22, 2010	Lewiston	United States	Artpark
With: Limp Bizkit, Seether, Slash and others
May 23, 2010	Columbus	United States	Columbus Crew Stadium ^{[4]}
North America, Leg No. 3 (Mayhem Festival) With: Korn, Lamb of God, Five Finger Death Punch and others
July 10, 2010	San Bernardino	United States	San Manuel Amphitheater
July 11, 2010	Mountain View	United States	Shoreline Amphitheatre
July 13, 2010	Auburn	United States	White River Amphitheatre
July 14, 2010	Nampa	United States	Idaho Center Amphitheatre
July 16, 2010	Phoenix	United States	Cricket Wireless Pavilion
July 17, 2010	Albuquerque	United States	Journal Pavilion
July 18, 2010	Greenwood Village	United States	Comfort Dental Amphitheatre
July 20, 2010	Maryland Heights	United States	Verizon Wireless Amphitheater
July 21, 2010	Cincinnati	United States	Riverbend Music Center
July 23, 2010	Camden	United States	Susquehanna Bank Center
July 24, 2010	Hartford	United States	Meadows Music Theater
July 25, 2010	Montreal	Canada	Parc Jean-Drapeau ^{[5]}
July 27, 2010	Mansfield	United States	Comcast Center
July 28, 2010	Holmdel	United States	PNC Bank Arts Center
July 30, 2010	Tinley Park	United States	First Midwest Bank Amphitheatre
July 31, 2010	Noblesville	United States	Verizon Wireless Music Center
August 1, 2010	Atlanta	United States	Lakewood Amphitheatre
August 3, 2010	Raleigh	United States	Time Warner Cable Music Pavilion
August 4, 2010	Virginia Beach	United States	Virginia Beach Amphitheater
August 6, 2010	Clarkston	United States	DTE Energy Music Theatre
August 7, 2010	Burgettstown	United States	First Niagara Pavilion
August 8, 2010	Bristow	United States	Jiffy Lube Live
August 10, 2010	Tampa	United States	Ford Amphitheatre
August 11, 2010	West Palm Beach	United States	Cruzan Amphitheatre
August 13, 2010	Dallas	United States	SuperPages.com Center
August 14, 2010	Oklahoma City	United States	Zoo Amphitheatre
North America, Leg No. 4 Co-Headlining with: Alice Cooper & Supported by: Murderdolls
September 30, 2010	Los Angeles	United States	Gibson Amphitheatre
October 1, 2010	Valley Center	United States	Harrah's Rincon
October 2, 2010	Tucson	United States	Anselmo Valencia Tori Amphitheater
October 4, 2010	West Valley City	United States	USANA Amphitheatre
October 6, 2010	Independence	United States	Independence Events Center
October 7, 2010	St. Charles	United States	Family Arena
October 8, 2010	Bloomington	United States	U.S. Cellular Coliseum
October 9, 2010	Youngstown	United States	Covelli Centre
October 10, 2010	Johnstown	United States	Cambria County War Memorial Arena
October 12, 2010	Binghamton	United States	Broome County Veterans Memorial Arena
October 14, 2010	Portland	United States	Cumberland County Civic Center
October 15, 2010	Uncasville	United States	Mohegan Sun Arena
October 16, 2010	Worcester	United States	DCU Center
October 17, 2010	Columbia	United States	Merriweather Post Pavilion
October 19, 2010	Roanoke	United States	Roanoke Performing Arts Theater
October 20, 2010	Nashville	United States	Nashville Municipal Auditorium
October 21, 2010	North Little Rock	United States	Verizon Arena
October 23, 2010	Grand Prairie	United States	Verizon Theatre at Grand Prairie
October 24, 2010	Corpus Christi	United States	Concrete Street Amphitheater
North America, Leg No. 5 Supporting Alice Cooper
December 18, 2010	Phoenix	United States	Comerica Theatre
North America, Leg No. 6
February 6, 2011	Santa Cruz	United States	The Catalyst Nightclub
February 9, 2011	Chico	United States	The Senator Theatre
February 10, 2011	Sacrmento	United States	Ace of Spades
Europe, Leg No. 1 Supported by: Skindred and Revoker
February 16, 2011	London	England	Brixton Academy
February 17, 2011	Manchester	England	Manchester Apollo
February 18, 2011	Newcastle	England	O2 Academy Newcastle
February 20, 2011	Glasgow	Scotland	O2 Academy Glasgow
February 21, 2011	Leeds	England	O2 Academy Leeds
February 22, 2011	Birmingham	England	O2 Academy Birmingham
Australia (Soundwave Festival) With: Iron Maiden, Queens of the Stone Age, One Day as a Lion, Slayer and others
February 26, 2011	Brisbane	Australia	RNA Showgrounds
February 27, 2011	Sydney	Australia	Eastern Creek Raceway
March 3, 2011	Melbourne	Australia	Festival Hall ^{[6]}
March 4, 2011	Melbourne	Australia	Melbourne Showgrounds
March 5, 2011	Adelaide	Australia	Bonython Park
March 7, 2011	Perth	Australia	Claremont Oval
Europe, Leg No. 2
June 3, 2011	Nürburgring	Germany	Rock am Ring
June 5, 2011	Nürnberg	Germany	Rock im Park
June 6, 2011	Oberhausen	Germany	Turbinenhalle
June 7, 2011	Berlin	Germany	Astroballe
June 10, 2011	Sölvesborg	Sweden	Sweden Rock Festival
June 12, 2011	Donington	England	Download Festival
June 14, 2011	Hamburg	Germany	Große Freiheit
June 15, 2011	Amsterdam	Netherlands	Paradiso
June 17, 2011	Clisson	France	Hellfest Summer Open Air
June 19, 2011	Lausanne	Switzerland	Docks
June 20, 2011	Vienna	Austria	Gasometer
June 21, 2011	Esch-sur-Alzette	Luxembourg	Rockhal
June 23, 2011	Vitoria	Spain	Azkena Rock Festival
June 25, 2011	Imola	Italy	Sonisphere Festival
June 26, 2011	Dessel	Belgium	Graspop Metal Meeting
North America, Leg No. 7
July 14, 2011	Cardott	United States	Rock Fest
July 15, 2011	Sioux Falls	United States	KRRO Fest
July 17, 2011	Tulsa	United States	Brady Theater ^{[5]}
July 20, 2011	Reading	United States	Sovereign Center
July 22, 2011	Detroit	United States	DTE Amphitheatre
July 23, 2011	Pittsburgh	United States	Stage AE
July 24, 2011	Toronto	Canada	Heavy T.O. Festival
July 27, 2011	Winnipeg	Canada	MTS Centre
July 29, 2011	Saskatoon	Canada	Credit Union Centre
July 30, 2011	Calgary	Canada	Scotiabank Saddledome
July 31, 2011	Edmonton	Canada	Rexall Place
August 2, 2011	Victoria	Canada	Save-On-Foods Memorial Centre
August 3, 2011	Vancouver	Canada	Rogers Arena
August 5, 2011	Portland	United States	Rose Quarter Memorial Coliseum
August 6, 2011	Seattle	United States	WaMu Theater
North America, Leg No. 8
May 11, 2012	Holmdel	United States	PNC Bank Arts Center
May 12, 2012	Scranton	United States	Toyota Pavilion at Montage Mountain
May 16, 2012	Pittsburgh	United States	Stage AE
May 18, 2012	Grand Rapids	United States	The Deltaplex
May 20, 2012	Columbus	United States	Rock on the Range Festival
May 22, 2012	La Crosse	United States	La Crosse Center
May 24, 2012	Sioux City	United States	Tyson Events Center
May 25, 2012	Park City	United States	Hartman Arena
May 26, 2012	Pryor	United States	Rocklahoma Festival

- 1 = Performance at the Revolver Golden Gods Awards ceremony
- 2 = Co-headlining performance at Lazerfest
- 3 = Headlining performance, not a part of the Soundwave Festival
- 4 = Rescheduled from February 8, 2011
- 5 = Headlining performance with Slayer

== Cancelled dates ==
Date	City	Country	Venue	R
June 28, 2011	Dublin	Ireland	The Olympia Theatre	1
June 29, 2011	Belfast	Northern Ireland	Ulster Hall	1
June 30, 2011	Edinburgh	Scotland	Edinburgh Corn Exchange	1
July 1, 2011	Roskilde	Denmark	Roskilde Festival	1
July 2, 2011	Helsinki	Finland	Sonisphere Festival – Kalasatama	1

- 1 Dates cancelled due to the band needing to return to the United States

== Personnel ==
- Rob Zombie – lead vocals
- John 5 – guitars, backing vocals
- Piggy D. – bass, backing vocals
- Ginger Fish – drums, percussion (February 6, 2011 – February 10, 2011; May 25, 2011 – August 6, 2011)
- Joey Jordison – drums, percussion (April 8, 2010 – December 18, 2010; February 16, 2011 – March 7, 2011)
- Tommy Clufetos – drums, percussion (October 15, 2009 – December 5, 2009)

== Songs performed ==
Originals

- "American Witch"
- "Demon Speeding"
- "Demonoid Phenomenon"
- "Dragula"
- "House of 1000 Corpses"
- "Jesus Frankenstein"
- "Let It All Bleed Out"
- "Living Dead Girl"
- "Mars Needs Women"
- "Never Gonna Stop (The Red Red Kroovy)"
- "Pussy Liquor"
- "Scum of the Earth"
- "Sick Bubblegum"
- "Superbeast"
- "The Devil's Rejects"
- "The Lords of Salem"
- "Werewolf Women of the SS"
- "What?"
- "What Lurks on Channel X?"

Covers

- "Beat It" (Michael Jackson) (snippet)
- "Black or White" (Michael Jackson) (snippet)
- "Boats n' Hoes" (Step Brothers) (snippet)
- "Creature of the Wheel" (White Zombie)
- "Electric Head, Pt. 2 (The Ecstasy)" (White Zombie)
- "Enter Sandman" (Metallica)
- "Heartbreaker" (Led Zeppelin) (snippet)
- "Highway to Hell" (AC/DC) (snippet)
- "Jesse's Girl" (Rick Springfield) (snippet)
- "More Human than Human" (White Zombie)
- "School's Out" (Alice Cooper)
- "Super-Charger Heaven" (White Zombie)
- "Sweet Dreams" (Marilyn Manson)
- "Thunderkiss '65" (White Zombie)

== Support acts ==
- Alice Cooper (Co-Headliner) (April 26 – May 22, 2010; September 30 – October 24, 2010)
- Black Label Society (October 17, 2010)
- Captain Clegg & The Night Creatures (October 29 – December 5, 2009)
- Children of Bodom (October 17, 2010)
- Clutch (October 17, 2010)
- Dommin (March 3, 2011)
- Duff McKagan's Loaded (June 6, 2011)
- Eyes Set To Kill (February 6–10, 2011)
- Exodus (July 20 – August 6, 2011)
- Lacuna Coil (May 11–25, 2012)
- Megadeth (Co-Headliner) (May 11–26, 2012)
- Monster Magnet (March 3, 2011)
- Murderdolls (September 30 – October 24, 2010; March 3, 2011)
- Nekromantix (October 29 – December 5, 2009)
- Revoker (February 16–22, 2011)
- Slayer (Co-Headliner) (July 20 – August 6, 2011)
- Skindred (February 16–22, 2011)
- Wayne Static (June 6–30, 2011)
