= Mad City =

Mad City may refer to:

- Mad City (film), a 1997 film starring John Travolta and Dustin Hoffman
- "Mad City" (Gotham), the subtitle of the first half of season 3 of Gotham
- Mad City, a 1988 Japanese video game released internationally as The Adventures of Bayou Billy
- "Mad City", nickname of Madison, Wisconsin

== See also ==
- "M.A.A.D City", a 2012 song by Kendrick Lamar
- "Mad City", a track on the 2016 mini-album NCT 127 (EP)
