= When the World Becomes Undone =

Studio album by A Pale Horse Named Death
- Released: January 18, 2019
- Genres: Gothic metal, doom metal, alternative metal
- Length: 61:58
- Label: Long Branch / SPV America

A Pale Horse Named Death chronology
Lay My Soul to Waste (2013)	When the World Becomes Undone (2019)	Infernum in Terra (2021)

When the World Becomes Undone is the third release by American metal band A Pale Horse Named Death, released on January 18, 2019. The first single, "Love the Ones You Hate", was released on November 16, 2018, initially exclusively via Loudwire.com.

The album was also released as a limited edition box set featuring two colored LPs (transparent green with black streaks), a CD version of the album, a beanie, patch, guitar pick and sticker. This version is serially numbered with only 550 copies released worldwide.

== Background ==
A five-year gap preceded When the World Becomes Undone as Sal Abruscato rejoined Life of Agony, which he co-founded, for a triumphant comeback tour and contributed musical arrangements on the 2017 album, "A Place Where There's No More Pain".

However, the album title "When the World Becomes Undone" stayed with him as he toured around the globe.

"The phrase When the World Becomes Undone came to me in 2014," he explains. "You could see what was beginning to happen in the world at large. Just turn on the news or look around. At the same time, there were a lot of crazy things happening in my personal life. Those struggles all became fuel for the music. It was like I had this partial sketch a while ago, and we finally filled it out this year. It evolved into what we have here."

== Concept ==
Sal explained the album's concept to Kerrang!: "The album is very dark and depressing about personal things that have gone on in my life, too. It's a conceptual ride about dark things that have gone on in my life. I try not to write too specifically, so people can interpret it into their own situations. The record goes on a long, tribal, funeral [sic], up-and-down kind of vibe. The first two singles were the most upbeat songs on the album; everything else just goes at a kill yourself tempo. By the end of the album, everything is so dark, that by the time you get to the closer, which is a recording of an actual outdoor funeral with a priest speaking over a casket, it takes you really down and dark. But, you also hear a bird singing in the background, which gives it a sense of enlightenment, of something to look forward to in the end. It's a journey — I like things very cinematic and grand."

== Track listing ==
The box set version of the album

1. "As It Begins" – 1:44
2. "When the World Becomes Undone" – 6:37
3. "Love the Ones You Hate" – 3:56
4. "Fell in My Hole" – 5:54
5. "Succumbing to the Event Horizon" – 1:25
6. "Vultures" – 6:08
7. "End of Days" – 6:31
8. "The Woods" – 2:40
9. "We All Break Down" – 6:10
10. "Lay with the Wicked" – 5:05
11. "Splinters" – 5:44
12. "Dreams of the End" – 7:02
13. "Closure" – 3:02

== Singles ==
=== Love the Ones You Hate ===
Of the debut single, Sal stated: "Love the Ones You Hate" is one of my favorite songs. It brings back the early '90s alternative goth metal that inspired us back then," comments vocalist and guitarist Sal Abruscato (ex-Type O Negative, ex-Life Of Agony). He adds, "The song is about moving on from friends that have intentionally hurt or betray you and it's time to forget them, let go of the grudge and the hate towards them. I wrote this song at my home in upstate New York and finally had the fuel to finish the lyrics this past year."

=== Vultures ===
The second single debuted on December 14, 2018 at Consequence of Sound. Of the song, Sal stated: "'Vultures' is about being used until you have nothing left to give — friends and family coming around only when they need you or when you have something they want and of course waiting for your demise."

=== When the World Becomes Undone ===
On January 10, 2019, the third single and title track, "When the World Becomes Undone", premiered on Metal Injection. Of the song, Sal said: "'When the World Becomes Undone' was a concept I came up with in late 2014 in regards to the global chaos that was happening. Sure enough 5 years later and it could not be more accurate. The world is in disarray and it has become undone."

=== Fell in My Hole ===
Spotify added "Fell in My Hole" to their "new metal tracks" playlist on March 15, 2019. On June 13, 2019, the official music video for the song was released.

== Production ==
- Maor Appelbaum - mastering engineer
