= A Pale Horse Named Death =

American metal band

- Origin: Brooklyn, New York, U.S.
- Genres: Alternative metal; gothic metal; doom metal; post-grunge
- Years active: 2010–present
- Label: SPV
- Members: Sal Abruscato; Joe William Taylor; Oddie McLaughlin; Chris Hamilton
- Past members: Bobby Hambel; Tommy Spano; Matt Brown; Johnny Kelly; Eric Morgan; Sam Shearon; David Bizzigotti
- Website: apalehorsenameddeath.com

A Pale Horse Named Death is an American metal band from Brooklyn, New York. It was formed in 2010 by Sal Abruscato (vocals/guitar, formerly drums for Type O Negative and Life of Agony) and produced/engineered by Matt Brown of Seventh Void and Uranium 235. The band has released four studio albums to date – And Hell Will Follow Me (2011), Lay My Soul to Waste (2013), When the World Becomes Undone (2019) and Infernum in Terra (2021).

== History ==
=== And Hell Will Follow Me (2011–2012) ===
A Pale Horse Named Death was formed in Brooklyn, New York by Sal Abruscato. Critique went with the June 2011 release of their album And Hell Will Follow Me. Abruscato's partner on the album is Matt Brown, sound engineer and former guitarist of Seventh Void. "The chemistry between me and Matt is unique and flawless; very rare in today's music. We are the murdering evil version of Lennon and McCartney," says Abruscato. Brown adds, "Sal asked me if I would help to take these songs to the next level. I took on this project for my friend, to find some closure in rough times. The album cover was made by Sam Shearon also known as o'Mister-Sam', who has also done work for Rob Zombie, Fear Factory and Rammstein, and has a 20 page booklet with artwork for each song. Also, the double LP version has a bonus track called "Pickup Truck". Life of Agony's Mina Caputo gave background vocals to four tracks and Lou Reed's saxophonist Ulrich Krieger plays on "Die Alone". Bobby Hambel from the band Biohazard - who has played with the band live at gigs played the guitar leads on three songs. Alongside Abruscato, Brown and Hambel, the live line-up put former Type O Negative and Seventh Void drummer Johnny Kelly on the drums, and Eric Morgan on bass. "This is my pinnacle creation, the best album I have ever done," commented Abruscato. "And after listening, most people are tending to agree." And Hell Will Follow Me was ranked No. 5 album of 2011 by Revolver Magazine.

=== Lay My Soul to Waste (2013–2016) ===
On January 21, 2013, Lay My Soul to Waste was announced. It was released in North America on May 21, 2013 and in Germany, Switzerland, and Austria on May 23, 2013. Its European release was May 24, 2013.

Sal Abruscato talked about the album by saying

"I can't express in words how proud I am of our accomplishment. To finally complete our sophomore album, sit back and listen to what we have done is a great feeling. From our performances to Matt Brown's mixes and finally having the album blessed by engineer and mastering great Ted Jensen, this album sounds bigger than the Grand Canyon. This album will surpass all expectations; it will be a privilege and an honor to present this album to all the fans."

=== When the World Becomes Undone (2017–2019) ===
On December 23, 2017, a new album was announced on the band's Twitter page. On January 29, 2018, it was announced on the band's website that the band had replaced both Matt Brown and Johnny Kelly with Joe Taylor of Lita Ford, Doro Pesch, Corey Glover and Cycle of Pain and Tommy Spano of Corey Glover and Sekond Skyn as new guitarist and drummer for the band. On April 5, 2018, it was announced that the band had signed a new deal with SPV and that the new album would be released on the label's Long Branch Records imprint. It was also revealed that Johnny Kelly has rejoined the band on drums.

On October 24, 2018, A Pale Horse Named Death announced that their first album in six years, titled When the World Becomes Undone, would be released on January 18, 2019.

On October 11, 2019, the band released a two-track EP titled Uncovered, featuring a cover of Three Dog Night's "One" and a cover of The Cure's "Prayers for Rain". It was made available as a 7" vinyl and as a digital download limited to 300 physical copies.

=== Infernum in Terra (2019–present) ===
When asked in November 2019 interview about the recording process and musical direction of When the World Becomes Undone, A Pale Horse Named Death drummer Sal Abruscato commented on a possible fourth album:

"I don't know what I wanna do with the next record; keep it the same as this one or again, do something different, work with different people, it's just an ever-lasting experience. To me, the most important thing though is the song writing. If you have the tunes, then the biggest battle is accomplished. If you don't have the songs, then you could go in there with the biggest guys like Rick Rubin or Bob Rock and it don't matter, the songs are gonna suck and no matter how much you polish it, you can't polish a turd!"

A Pale Horse Named Death announced on February 5, 2021, via Facebook that they had completed demos for their fourth studio album planned for release later in the year.

The band announced the new album title and track listing on May 17, 2021, through their bandcamp page. Featuring 11 songs, the fourth full-length album is titled Infernum in Terra, was released on September 24, 2021.

== Musical style ==
In his review of And Hell Will Follow Me, AllMusic critic Alex Henderson described the band's music as alternative metal with elements of doom metal, gothic metal, grunge, and stoner rock. He compared the album to Type O Negative, Alice in Chains, Soundgarden, Black Sabbath, and Metallica's Load album. Metal.de reviewer Marc Thorbrügge described the sound as "dark and pissed-off" gothic metal in the vein of Type O Negative with elements of modern post-grunge and some stoner rock riffs. In his biography for AllMusic, James Christopher Monger described the band as a combination of gothic metal and post-grunge. BraveWords called them a doom metal band.

Sal Abruscato's vocals have drawn comparisons with deceased Alice in Chains singer Layne Staley.

== Members ==
- Sal Abruscato – vocals, guitars, drums
- Chis Hamilton – drums
- Eric Morgan – bass
- Eddie Heedles – guitars
- Joe Taylor – guitars

Former

- Bobby Hambel – guitars
- Matt Brown – producer/engineer/guitars
- Tommy Spano – drums
- Dave Bizzigotti – bass
- Johnny Kelly – drums

== Discography ==
Studio albums

- And Hell Will Follow Me (2011)
- Lay My Soul to Waste (2013)
- When the World Becomes Undone (2019)
- Infernum in Terra (2021)

Extended plays

- Uncovered (2019)
