= Hellbilly Deluxe 2 =

Studio album by Rob Zombie
- Released: February 2, 2010
- Recorded: 2008
- Genres: Alternative metal; industrial metal
- Length: 46:20
- Labels: Roadrunner; Loud & Proud
- Producer: Rob Zombie

Rob Zombie chronology
Zombie Live (2007)	Hellbilly Deluxe 2 (2010)	Mondo Sex Head (2012)

Alternative cover
- Cover art for Hellbilly Deluxe II reissue

Singles from Hellbilly Deluxe 2
- 1. "What?" Released: October 6, 2009; 2. "Sick Bubblegum" Released: January 11, 2010

Audio
- "Album" playlist on YouTube

Hellbilly Deluxe 2: Noble Jackals, Penny Dreadfuls and the Systematic Dehumanization of Cool is the fourth solo studio album by American musician Rob Zombie. The album is a sequel to his debut album Hellbilly Deluxe. It was released on February 2, 2010, through Roadrunner Records. This is the first album with bassist Piggy D and the last with drummer Tommy Clufetos.

== Background ==
Rob Zombie had finished recording the album before the end of 2008, but the release had been delayed until November 2009 due to his commitments with Halloween II, and again until February 2010 due to a lack of promotion. According to Rob Zombie, there was not enough time to release advance copies to the press or create a music video for the first single, "What?", before their tour. Though originally intended to be released through Geffen Records, Zombie's record label of 18 years starting with White Zombie, the album was released through Roadrunner Records/Loud & Proud Records.

Hellbilly Deluxe 2 is also the first release where Rob Zombie worked with his full touring band. Previous albums were written and recorded by Rob Zombie himself and a rotating set of musicians. Commenting on the change, Zombie stated, "I've always had a revolving roster of studio and touring musicians, but the three guys in my band now have been on tour with me for years. So we're making it as a band. It's called Rob Zombie, but we're treating it like a band."

Rob Zombie enlisted the help of artists Dan Brereton (creator of Nocturnals), Alex Horley (of Image Comics and DC Comics) and David Hartman (storyboard artist) to create the album artwork. British dark/horror/science fiction/steampunk artist Sam Shearon aka 'Mister Sam Shearon' (artwork for Godhead, Ministry, Slayer, IDW Publishing, Clive Barker, and tour merchandise for Iron Maiden and HIM) also contributed to the artwork of Hellbilly Deluxe 2.

Rob Zombie began touring in support of the new album shortly before its release date. The first leg of the Hellbilly Deluxe 2 World Tour featured Nekromantix and Captain Clegg & The Night Creatures, the fictional band from Halloween II. Uncle Seymour Coffins, also from Halloween II, hosted the Los Angeles show on Halloween night.

The lead single "What?" debuted on radio stations on October 6 and was released on iTunes on October 13. Another new song, "Burn", was released on Rock Band on October 27 as part of a triple pack which also includes the hits "Dragula" and "Superbeast". "Burn" was later released as a free download on December 17, 2009, on the band's website.

== Reissue ==
The drummer on the studio recordings for Hellbilly Deluxe 2, Tommy Clufetos, left the band in early 2010 to play drums on Ozzy Osbourne's album Scream. Clufetos was replaced by Murderdolls guitarist and Slipknot drummer Joey Jordison, initially as a touring member. Before joining the 2010 Mayhem Festival, though, Jordison joined Zombie, John 5 and Piggy D. to record new songs. These tracks were described by Zombie as "some of the fastest and heaviest tracks we have recorded in a long, long time." The three new tracks recorded with this lineup, "Devil's Hole Girls and the Big Revolution," "Michael" and "Everything Is Boring," were released as bonus tracks on the reissue of Hellbilly Deluxe 2 as tracks 1, 14 and 8 respectively.

John Tempesta, former member of White Zombie and drummer on Zombie's early solo albums, also was expected to join those sessions, to be featured on a song called "Loving the Freaks." Zombie said later that the work with Tempesta never took place due to schedule conflicts.

The reissued version was released on September 28, 2010, through Roadrunner Records. Along with new artwork, the reissue also contains a new version of "The Man Who Laughs", most notably replacing the original drum solo with a mandolin solo instead and is about two minutes shorter than the original. The intro to "Mars Needs Women" has been separated into the track "Theme for an Angry Red Planet". Also included is a bonus DVD containing a 30-minute tour documentary titled "Transylvanian Transmissions."

== Reception ==
Professional ratings
Aggregate scores
Source	Rating
Metacritic	63/100
Review scores
Source	Rating
AbsolutePunk	62%
AllMusic	3/5 stars
Alternative Press	2.5/5 stars
Billboard	3.5/5 stars
Entertainment Weekly	B−
Los Angeles Times	3.5/4 stars
Kerrang!	4/5 stars
PopMatters	6/10
Uncut	2/5 stars
USA Today	3/4 stars

Hellbilly Deluxe 2 received generally positive reviews from critics. On Metacritic, the album earned a score of 63/100 based on ten reviews. The album debuted at No. 8 on the Billboard 200 chart, selling 49,000 copies in its first week of release.

== Track listing ==
=== Original version ===
All tracks are written by Rob Zombie and John 5, except "The Man Who Laughs" written by Rob Zombie, John 5, Piggy D., and Tommy Clufetos.

No.	Title	Length
1.	"Jesus Frankenstein"	5:21
2.	"Sick Bubblegum"	3:44
3.	"What?"	2:47
4.	"Mars Needs Women"	4:58
5.	"Werewolf, Baby!"	4:00
6.	"Virgin Witch"	3:38
7.	"Death and Destiny Inside the Dream Factory"	2:19
8.	"Burn"	3:04
9.	"Cease to Exist"	3:39
10.	"Werewolf Women of the SS"	3:01
11.	"The Man Who Laughs"	9:44
Total length:		46:20

iTunes bonus tracks
No.	Title	Length
12.	"What?" (The Naughty Cheerleader mix)	2:54
13.	"Jesus Frankenstein" (Halfway to Hell and Loving It mix)	6:18
14.	"Sick Bubblegum" (Men Or Monsters... Or Both? mix)	5:11
15.	"Werewolf, Baby!" (Las Noches del Hombre Lobo remix (pre-order only))	3:53
Total length:		64:16

=== Reissue ===
CD
No.	Title	Length
1.	"Devil's Hole Girls and the Big Revolution"	4:07
2.	"Jesus Frankenstein"	5:19
3.	"Sick Bubblegum"	3:42
4.	"What?"	2:46
5.	"Theme for an Angry Red Planet"	1:32
6.	"Mars Needs Women" (without intro)	3:24
7.	"Werewolf, Baby!"	3:57
8.	"Everything Is Boring"	3:32
9.	"Virgin Witch"	3:37
10.	"Death and Destiny Inside the Dream Factory"	2:16
11.	"Burn"	2:58
12.	"Cease to Exist"	3:36
13.	"Werewolf Women of the SS"	2:59
14.	"Michael"	3:27
15.	"The Man Who Laughs" (new version)	7:27
Total length:		54:10

DVD
No.	Title	Length
1.	"Mars Needs Women"	3:45
2.	"School's Out" (Alice Cooper cover)	4:36
3.	"Transylvanian Transmissions"	26:16

== Personnel ==
- Rob Zombie – vocals, lyrics, producer, photography, art direction, package design
- John 5 – guitars
- Piggy D. – bass
- Tommy Clufetos – drums
- Joey Jordison – drums on tracks 1, 8, 14 (for reissue)
- Tyler Bates – string arrangements
- Chris Baseford – keyboards and programming, recording, mixing
- The Chop Shop, Hollywood, California – recording and mixing location
- Tom Baker – mastering
- Dan Brereton – artwork
- Alex Horley – artwork
- David Hartman – artwork
- Sam Shearon – artwork
- Piggy D. – photography, including cover
- Wayne Toth – makeup, photography
- Bart Mixon – makeup

== Charts ==
Chart (2010)	Peak position
Australian Albums (ARIA)	23
Austrian Albums (Ö3 Austria)	72
Canadian Albums (Billboard)	11
French Albums (SNEP)	136
German Albums (Offizielle Top 100)	60
Greece Albums (IFPI)	11
New Zealand Albums (RMNZ)	31
Scottish Albums (Official Charts)	66
Swiss Albums (Schweizer Hitparade)	64
UK Albums (OCC)	65
US Billboard 200	8
US Top Hard Rock Albums (Billboard)	1
US Top Rock Albums (Billboard)	1
