= Revolution Rise =

Studio album by Kill Devil Hill
- Released: October 29, 2013
- Genre: Heavy metal, hard rock
- Length: 55:50
- Label: Century Media
- Producer: Jeff Pilson

Kill Devil Hill chronology
Kill Devil Hill (2012)	Revolution Rise (2013)

Revolution Rise is the second studio album by the American hard rock supergroup Kill Devil Hill. It is the band's final album to feature drummer Vinny Appice and bassist Rex Brown due to their departures in March 2014 and January 2019, respectively.

== Track listing ==
No.	Title	Length
1.	"No Way Out"	4:01
2.	"Crown of Thorns"	4:40
3.	"Leave It All Behind"	4:41
4.	"Why"	3:30
5.	"Wake Up the Dead"	5:22
6.	"Long Way from Home"	5:34
7.	"Where Angels Dare to Roam"	5:05
8.	"Stained Glass Sadness"	4:43
9.	"Endless Static"	4:01
10.	"Stealing Days"	4:20
11.	"Life Goes On" (includes bonus track)	9:53

== Personnel ==
- Jason Bragg – vocals
- Rex Brown – bass
- Vinny Appice – drums
- Mark Zavon – guitars

=== Additional personnel ===
- Jay Ruston – mixing
- Sam Shearon – artwork
