= Smoke Hollow =

American rock band

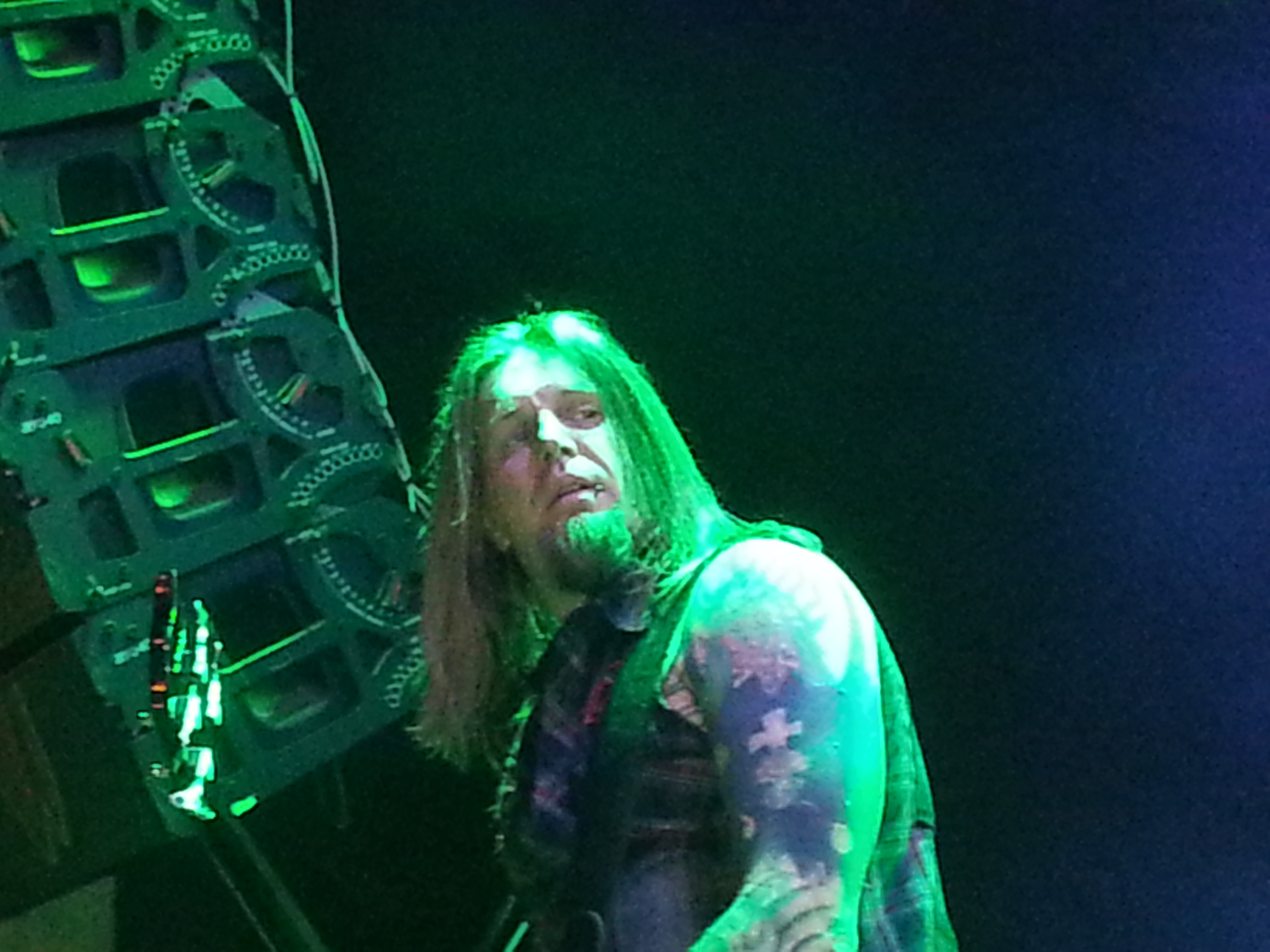
- Bass guitarist John Exall

Background information
- Origin: United States
- Genres: Heavy metal, hard rock
- Years active: 2015–present
- Labels: CMC21 Productions
- Members: John Exall; Jason Williams; Dewey Bragg; Ralf Mueggler
- Past members: Diego "Ashes" Ibarra
- Website: Smoke Hollow on Facebook

Smoke Hollow is an American heavy metal band formed in 2015. In 2017, the ensemble released their debut studio album entitled Salvation.

== History ==
In July 2015, a rock band was started by bass guitarist John Exall, formerly of Texas Hippie Coalition, lead guitarist Diego "Ashes" Ibarra of Static-X, vocalist Jason "Dewey" Bragg of Kill Devil Hill, and drummer Ralf Mueggler of Crowned by Fire. Soon after the band was started, Jason Williams of heavy metal band Delphian replaced Ibarra. In August 2015, the band began an Indiegogo crowdfunding campaign to assist with the recording of their debut album.

In June 2017, they published an audio recording for "Edge of Tomorrow", followed by an Independence Day release of "Nowhere to Run" near the beginning of the month following. On July 28, 2017, their debut studio album, Salvation, was released. In December 2018, the band announced that they were creating a music video for "Salvation", the title track for their debut album.

== Personnel ==
=== Current ===
- Jason "Dewey" Bragg – vocals (2015–present)
- Jason Williams – lead guitar (2015–present)
- John Exall – bass guitar (2015–present)
- Ralf Mueggler – drums (2015–present)

=== Former ===
- Diego "Ashes" Ibarra – lead guitar (2015)

== Discography ==
- Salvation (2017)
