= What? (Rob Zombie song) =

Single by Rob Zombie

from the album Hellbilly Deluxe 2
- Released: 2009
- Recorded: 2008
- Length: 2:45
- Label: Roadrunner
- Songwriters: Rob Zombie, John 5

Rob Zombie singles chronology
"Foxy Foxy" (2006)	"What?" (2009)	"Sick Bubblegum" (2010)

"What?" is the first single release from Rob Zombie's album Hellbilly Deluxe 2 (full title Hellbilly Deluxe 2: Noble Jackals, Penny Dreadfuls and the Systematic Dehumanization of Cool), released in early 2010 on Roadrunner Records/Loud & Proud Records.

The song was released on the radio on October 6, 2009, and was released on iTunes October 13.

The intro to the song is a dialogue sampled from the 1977 horror film The Child.

== Personnel ==
Music

- Rob Zombie – vocals
- John 5 – guitar
- Piggy D. – bass
- Tommy Clufetos – drums

Art & design

- Dan Brereton – artwork
- Alex Horley – artwork
- David Hartman – artwork
- Sam Shearon – artwork
- Piggy D. – cover photo
- Rob Zombie – cover art
