= Sal Abruscato =

American musician

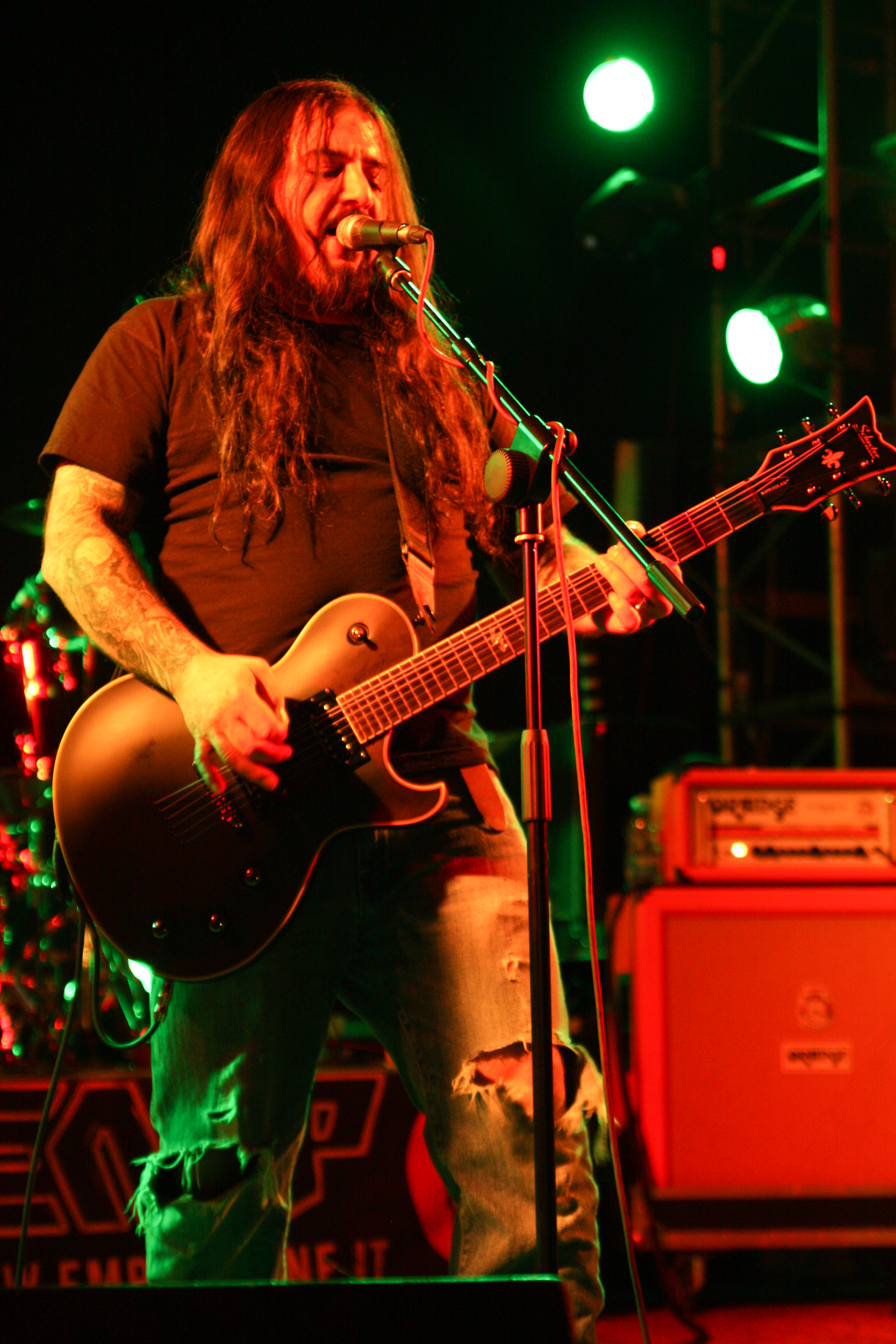
- Abruscato in 2012

Background information
- Born: July 18, 1970 (age 56)
- Origin: Brooklyn, New York City, U.S.
- Genres: Gothic metal; doom metal; alternative metal
- Occupations: Musician; singer; songwriter
- Instruments: Drums; vocals; guitar
- Member of: A Pale Horse Named Death
- Formerly of: Type O Negative; Life of Agony; Supermassiv; Toximia
- Website: apalehorsenameddeath.com

Sal Abruscato (born July 18, 1970) is an American drummer, guitarist, singer, and songwriter, best known as the original drummer for Brooklyn metal bands Type O Negative and Life of Agony.

He is currently the frontman for doom metal band A Pale Horse Named Death, with whom he has released four albums: And Hell Will Follow Me (2011), Lay My Soul to Waste (2013), When the World Becomes Undone (2019) and Infernum in Terra (2021).

== Discography ==
=== Type O Negative ===
- Slow Deep and Hard (1991)
- The Origin of the Feces (1992)
- Bloody Kisses (1993)
- After Dark DVD (1994)
- Life Is Killing Me (2003) (Guest backing vocals on "I Like Goils")

=== Life of Agony ===
- River Runs Red (1993)
- Ugly (1995)
- River Runs Again (2003)
- Broken Valley (2005)
- A Place Where There's No More Pain (2017)

=== A Pale Horse Named Death ===
- And Hell Will Follow Me (2011)
- Lay My Soul to Waste (2013)
- When the World Becomes Undone (2019)
- Infernum in Terra (2021)
