= Lay My Soul to Waste =

Studio album by A Pale Horse Named Death
- Released: May 21, 2013
- Genre: Gothic metal, doom metal, alternative metal
- Length: 50:26
- Label: SPV America
- Producer: Matt Brown

A Pale Horse Named Death chronology
| And Hell Will Follow Me (2010) | Lay My Soul to Waste (2013) | When the World Becomes Undone (2019) |

Professional ratings
Review scores
| Source | Rating |
|---|---|
| Blabbermouth.net | 9/10 |
| Metal Hammer | 4/5 stars |

Lay My Soul to Waste is the second release by American metal band A Pale Horse Named Death, released by SPV America on May 21, 2013.

A music video (the very first for the band) was released for the track "DMSLT".

The album was also released on limited edition, translucent green marbled vinyl.

== Reception ==
Blabbermouth.net wrote "Think Alice in Chains, only harder, angrier and with a more perverse view of the world, as if they were reared in a row house in Bensonhurst, as opposed to the rainy landscape of Seattle, all the while feasting on a steady diet of Black Sabbath records".

== Track listing ==
The vinyl version of Lay My Soul to Waste

Written by Sal Abruscato.

1. "Lay My Soul to Waste" – 1:13
2. "Shallow Grave" – 5:18
3. "The Needle in You" – 4:16
4. "In the Sleeping Death" – 5:35
5. "Killer by Night" – 3:33
6. "Growing Old" – 3:32
7. "Dead of Winter" – 3:23
8. "Devil Came with a Smile" – 4:05
9. "Day of the Storm" – 7:39
10. "DMSLT" – 4:38
11. "Cold Dark Mourning" – 7:15

== Song notes ==
- "DMSLT" stands for "Doesn't Make Sense Living Today".
