= Julie Smith (novelist) =

American writer (born 1944)

- Born: November 25, 1944 (age 81); Annapolis, Maryland, U.S.
- Occupation: Author
- Writing career
- Genre: Mystery fiction
- Notable awards: Edgar Allan Poe Award for Best Novel (1991)
- Website: juliesmithauthor.com

Julie Smith (born November 25, 1944) is an American mystery writer, the author of nineteen novels and several short stories. She received the 1991 Edgar Award for Best Novel for her sixth book, New Orleans Mourning (1990).

== Works ==
=== Novels ===
- Death Turns A Trick (Walker & Co., 1982)
- The Sourdough Wars (Walker & Co., 1984)
- True-Life Adventure (Mysterious Press, 1985)
- Tourist Trap (Mysterious Press, 1986)
- Huckleberry Fiend (Mysterious Press, 1987)
- New Orleans Mourning (St. Martin's Press, 1990)
- The Axeman's Jazz (St. Martin's Press, 1991)
- Dead in the Water (Ivy, 1991)
- Other People's Skeletons (Ivy, 1993)
- Jazz Funeral (Fawcett/Columbine, 1993)
- New Orleans Beat (Fawcett/Columbine, 1994)
- House of Blues (Fawcett/Columbine, 1995)
- The Kindness of Strangers (Fawcett/Columbine, 1996)
- Crescent City Kill (Fawcett/Columbine, 1997)
- 82 Desire (Fawcett/Columbine, 1998)
- Louisiana Hotshot (Forge, 2001)
- Louisiana Bigshot (Forge, 2002)
- Mean Woman Blues (Forge, 2003)
- Louisiana Lament (Forge, 2004)
- P.I. On A Hot Tin Roof (Forge, 2005)
- Murder on Magazine (booksBnimble, 2018)
- The Big Crazy (booksBnimble, 2019)

=== Short stories ===
- "Grief Counselor", Mike Shayne Mystery Magazine, 1978; reprinted in Miniature Mysteries: 100 Malicious Little Mystery Stories, edited by Isaac Asimov, Martin H. Greenberg, and Joseph D. Olander (Taplinger, 1981), and in Last Laughs: The 1986 Mystery Writers of America Anthology, edited by Gregory McDonald (Mysterious Press, 1986)
- "The Wrong Number", Mike Shayne Mystery Magazine, 1979
- "Crime Wave in Pinhole", Alfred Hitchcock's Mystery Magazine, 1980; reprinted in The Arbor House Treasury of Mystery and Suspense, edited by Bill Pronzini, Barry N. Malzberg, and Martin H. Greenberg (Arbor House, 1981)
- "Project Mushroom", Ellery Queen's Mystery Magazine 1983; reprinted in 101 Mystery Stories, edited by Bill Pronzini and Martin H. Greenbery (Avenel, 1986)
- "Red Rock", Raymond Chandler's Philip Marlowe: A Centennial Celebration, edited by Byron Preiss (Knopf, 1988)
- "Blood Types", Sisters In Crime, edited by Marilyn Wallace (Berkley, 1989)
- "Cul-de-Sac", Sisters In Crime II, edited by Marilyn Wallace (Berkley, 1990)
- "Montezuma's Other Revenge", Justice for Hire, edited by Robert J Randisi (Mysterious Press, 1990)
- "A Marriage Made in Hell", Eye of a Woman, edited by Sara Paretsky (Delacorte Press, 1991)
- "Silk Strands", Deadly Allies, edited by Marilyn Wallace and Robert J. Randisi (Bantam, 1992)
- "Strangers on a Plane", Unusual Suspects, edited by James Grady, (Black Lizard Press, 1996)
- "The End of the Earth", Detective Duos, edited by Marcia Muller and Bill Pronzini (Oxford University Press, 1997)
- "Where The Boys Are", Mary Higgins Clark Mystery Magazine, September 1998
- "Too Mean to Die", Blue Lightning, edited by John Harvey (Slow Dancer Press, 1998)
- "Fresh Paint", Irreconcilable Differences, edited by Lia Matera (HarperCollins, 1999)
- "Always Othello", Mary Higgins Clark Mystery Magazine, June 1999
- "Let's Go Knock Over Seaside", Murder and Magnolias (HarperCollins 2000)
- "Kid Trombone", Murder And All That Jazz (Signet, 2004)

=== Fiction by series ===
==== Skip Langdon ====
- New Orleans Mourning (St. Martin's Press, 1990)
- The Axeman's Jazz (St. Martin's Press, 1991)
- Jazz Funeral (Fawcett/Columbine, 1993)
- New Orleans Beat (Fawcett/Columbine, 1994) (later reissued as Death Before Facebook, see Amazon author page)
- House of Blues (Fawcett/Columbine, 1995)
- The Kindness of Strangers (Fawcett/Columbine, 1996)
- Crescent City Kill (Fawcett/Columbine, 1997)
- 82 Desire (Fawcett/Columbine, 1998 - introduces Talba Wallis)
- Mean Woman Blues (Forge, 2003)
- Murder on Magazine (booksBnimble, 2018)
- The Big Crazy (booksBnimble, 2019)

==== Rebecca Schwartz ====
- Death Turns A Trick (Walker & Co., 1982)
- The Sourdough Wars (Walker & Co., 1984)
- Tourist Trap (Mysterious Press, 1986)
- Dead in the Water (Ivy, 1991)
- Other People's Skeletons (Ivy, 1993)

==== Talba Wallis ====
- Louisiana Hotshot (Forge, 2001)
- Louisiana Bigshot (Forge, 2002)
- Louisiana Lament (Forge, 2004)
- P.I. On A Hot Tin Roof (Forge, 2005)

==== Paul MacDonald ====
- True-Life Adventure (Mysterious Press, 1985)
- Huckleberry Fiend (Mysterious Press, 1987)

=== Essay ===
- "Splendor in the Mildew", A Place Called Home, edited by Mickey Perlman (St. Martin's Press, 1996)

=== Progressive novel ===
- I'd Kill For That, edited by Marcia Talley (St. Martin's, 2004) (With twelve other writers, including Rita Mae Brown, Linda Fairstein, Kathy Reichs, Jennifer Crusie, Anne Perry, and Katherine Neville)

=== Edited ===
- New Orleans Noir (Akashic, 2007)

== Awards ==
Smith's 1990 novel, New Orleans Mourning, won the 1991 Edgar Award for "Best Novel" and was nominated for the Anthony Award for the same honor in the same year.
