= The Adventures of Bayou Billy =

1988 video game

- North American box art
- Developer: Konami
- Publisher: Konami
- Designers: Nakamoto Ichigou; Moon Nakamoto; Susumu Kusaka; Azusa Fujimoto
- Programmers: Kazuhiro Aoyama; Mitsuaki Ogawa; Tsukasa Hiyoshi; Etsunobu Ebisu
- Composers: Jun Funahashi; Kiyohiro Sada; Hidenori Maezawa; Atsushi Fujio; Tsutomu Ogura
- Platform: Nintendo Entertainment System
- Release: JP: August 12, 1988; NA: June 1989; PAL: January 24, 1991
- Genre: Beat 'em up
- Mode: Single-player

The Adventures of Bayou Billy, known in Japan as Mad City (マッド・シティ), is a 1988 beat 'em up video game developed and published by Konami for the Nintendo Entertainment System.

== Plot ==
Billy West, otherwise named Bayou Billy, is a vigilante from the bayous of Louisiana, who has fought against a local crime boss, known as Godfather Gordon. In retaliation for interfering with his smuggling operations, Gordon kidnaps Billy's girlfriend Annabelle Lane in order to lure Billy into one final battle. Billy's quest to save Annabelle consists of nine stages that takes him from the swamplands to Bourbon Street, as he battles Gordon's henchmen and eventually arrives at his estate to face him.

== Gameplay ==
Screenshot of the first level

Most of the game follows a side-scrolling beat-'em-up format where the player character must engage in hand-to-hand combat against every enemy he encounters to proceed from one area to the next until reaching the end of each stage before his health runs out. Billy's basic attacks consists of a punch, a kick and a jump kick performed by pressing the A and B buttons simultaneously. The player can also arm Billy with one of three melee weapons dropped by certain enemies: a throwing knife, a club and a whip. Picking up a new weapon while in possession of one will replace it. Billy can also pick up guns, which the player can draw or withdraw at any time by pressing the Select button (when Billy is using a gun, the number next to the "bullet" indicator at the top of the screen will start flashing). Other power-ups in these stages include a chicken drumstick that refills Billy's health and body armor which protects Billy from enemy bullets and reduces the damage he takes from different attacks. While most the enemies in the beat-'em-up stages are human, the player will occasionally fight animals as well such as crocodiles, eagles and guard dogs.

In Stages 2 and 7, the game adopts a rail shooting format viewed from a first-person perspective, which can be played with a standard controller or with an NES Zapper, depending on the mode chosen by the player at the start. In these stages, the player must shoot as many gunmen as possible and then destroy the boss at the end without running out of health or ammunition. Certain enemies will drop additional ammo and health kits, as well as other power-ups such as an hourglass that gives Billy unlimited ammo for a brief moment, a bulletproof vest that leaves him invulnerable for a while, and a star that destroys all on-screen enemies.

In Stages 4 and 5, the player must drive Billy's jeep through the freeway from the grasslands to the suburbs before time runs out. In these two stages, the player steers and accelerates the jeep with the d-pad, while the A and B buttons are used to launch grenades at airborne enemy vehicles and shoot at other cars in front of the jeep. These are the only stages where the player does not have a health gauge and as a result, a single collision with an enemy vehicle, bomb explosion or any other road hazard will cause a life to be lost. The player can pick up gasoline cans along the way to extend the time limit.

In addition to the main mode, there is also a practice mode featuring shorter versions of select stages in order to help players familiarize themselves with the controls for each gameplay style. Completing a practice stage will award the player with a power-up that can be used in the main game.

== Regional differences ==
The game was originally released for the Famicom in Japan under the title of Mad City and was retitled The Adventures of Bayou Billy when it was converted to the NES for the international market, undergoing many extensive changes during the localization process. The NES version is more difficult than the Famicom version. Enemies in the beat-'em-up stages are more aggressive and have more health, the player starts the shooting stages with less ammunition, and the driving stages have narrower roads. The driving stages in the Famicom version also give Billy's jeep a health gauge, allowing it to withstand collision from enemy vehicles and road hazards, a benefit not available in the NES version. The Famicom version has four possible endings, whereas the NES version only has one.

The NES version also features many audio and visual changes. Enemy characters and backgrounds are colored differently and the game's heroine, Annabelle, wears more revealing clothing in the NES version (having been changed from a v-neck dress to denim shorts and a midriff T-shirt). DPCM-coded voice samples were added, such as an announcer declaring the title when the player starts the game and Gordon laughing between stages. In the Japanese version, four different endings can be achieved by using certain operations. If played in Easy mode, Billy will save Annabelle, but also comments on "something lost". The game then proceeds with a notice of playing in a harder mode. Beating the game normally results in the usual ending. Beating the game, but not coming to Annabelle after rescuing her will result in a "bad ending" where Annabelle leaves Billy. A fourth ending can be achieved by certain operations and in this ending, Billy and Annabelle will speak in Kansai dialect.

== Release ==
The Adventures of Bayou Billy was re-released for the Wii U via Virtual Console in 2016.

== Reception ==
Reception

Review score
Publication	Score
Nintendo Life	5/10

Nintendo Life rated the game 5 out of 10.

== Related media ==
=== Comic ===
Archie Comics published a comic book series based on The Adventures of Bayou Billy written by Rich Margopoulos and illustrated by Amanda Conner, which lasted five bi-monthly issues dated from September 1989 to June 1990. The comic takes liberties with the plot and characterizations of the game and introduces an additional cast of supporting characters. Bayou Billy (whose full name is William Jackson West in the comic) is a bounty hunter assisted by his former military companions of Broadside, Sureshot and Tracker, as they protect the innocent from a local mob led by Giles Gordon and his two sons Rocky and Rocco (who were originally Gordon's bodyguards in the game). Annabelle Lane (who is renamed Annabel Lee) also appears in the comic as an assistant district attorney who becomes romantically involved with Billy after being rescued from Gordon's lackeys. The fourth issue reveals that Billy is a widower whose first wife was killed in an ordered hit by Gordon meant for him.

=== Television ===
Bayou Billy appears in the Captain N: The Game Master episode "How's Bayou", voiced by Garry Chalk.

== See also ==
- New Orleans in fiction
