= We Cast a Shadow =

2019 satirical novel by Maurice Carlos Ruffin

- Author: Maurice Carlos Ruffin
- Language: English
- Subject: Racism, parenthood, social stratification
- Genre: Dystopian, satire
- Set in: Near-future American South
- Publisher: One World
- Publication date: January 29, 2019
- Pages: 336
- Awards: Finalist for PEN/Faulkner Award for Fiction (2020)
- ISBN: 978-0525509097

We Cast a Shadow is a novel by Maurice Carlos Ruffin which features a father raising a biracial son in a dystopian future. The novel deals with themes of racism and parenthood. The novel was a finalist for the 2020 PEN/Falkner Award and longlisted for a Dublin Literary Award.

== Plot ==
The book takes place in a near-future American South, where an experimental procedure called "demelanization" allows black individuals to pass for white. The unnamed narrator's preteen son, Nigel, has a black birthmark which is growing larger as he ages. The narrator wants his son to undergo demelanization to protect him from ghettos, racism, and police violence.

To afford this procedure, the narrator needs to earn a bonus at his law firm, where he has been promoted to the chair of the diversity initiative. Getting the bonus means impressing the board, which is all white. He dresses in a Zulu costume and dances at a company party. He joins a local diversity group led by a white man who wears a dashiki. Even when he is involved in a car accident, and a terrorist attack leads to a police crackdown, he is single-minded in his goal to get his bonus.

== Reception ==
The book's use of racism and the changing of black bodies has been compared to the film Get Out. Reviews noted the narrator's self-hating behavior. Reviewers praised the fast-paced writing style and anxious tone. Ian Mond of Locus Magazine said that despite hating the narrator, he kept reading. The narrator was never portrayed as a villain or a caricature. The narrative has been called an allegory for the existential struggles of marginalised people in America.

== Awards ==
The novel was a finalist for a 2020 PEN/Faulkner Award. It was longlisted for a 2019 Center for Fiction First Novel Prize, and longlisted for a 2021 Dublin Literary Award.
