= Kill Devil Hill (band) =

American rock band

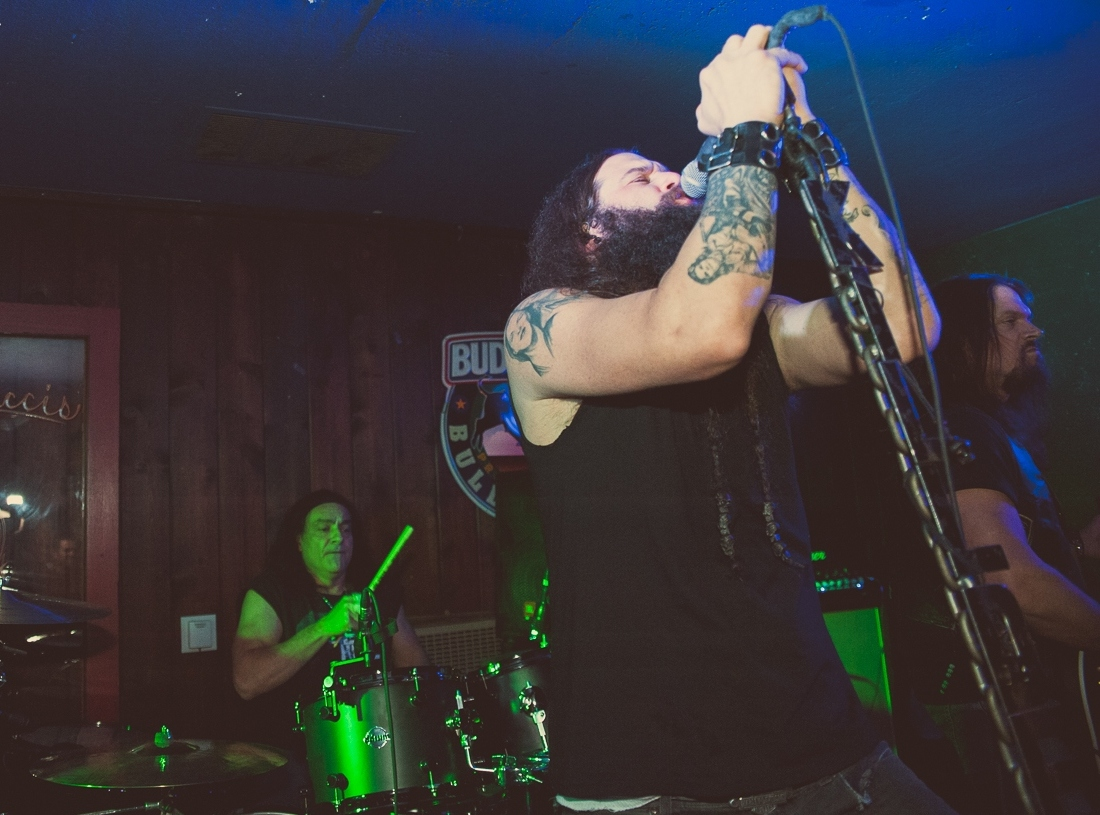
- Kill Devil Hill in 2012. L–R: Vinny Appice, Dewey Bragg, and Mark Zavon

Background information
- Origin: Kill Devil Hills, North Carolina, U.S.
- Genres: Heavy metal; hard rock; post-grunge
- Years active: 2011–present
- Label: SPV
- Members: Dewey Bragg; Mark Zavon; Johnny Kelly; Matt Snell
- Past members: Rex Brown; Vinny Appice; Nico D'Arnese
- Website: killdevilhillmusic.com

Kill Devil Hill is an American heavy metal supergroup, founded in 2011 by drummer Vinny Appice (formerly Black Sabbath, Heaven & Hell and Dio), bassist Rex Brown (Pantera and formerly Down), guitarist Mark Zavon (formerly 40 Cycle Hum), and lead vocalist Dewey Bragg. The band is named after the town of Kill Devil Hills, North Carolina, a location renowned from pirating days.

The band's sound has been described as "heavy and modern without succumbing to typical contemporary hardcore trappings – indecipherable vocals or overused blast beats."

== History ==
Kill Devil Hill released their self-titled debut album in May 2012. They toured the US with rock band Adrenaline Mob.

On March 10, 2014, it was announced that Vinny Appice had left the band in order to commit to other things and projects, and that former Type O Negative drummer Johnny Kelly was his replacement. Appice later stated his leaving the band was due to the lack of punctuality of his bandmates.

The band performed on Motörhead's Boat Cruise in September 2014 and after touring, the band started to write another album with their new member Johnny Kelly. They decided to record at Stagg Street Studios in California with help from engineer Josh Newell (Linkin Park, In This Moment).

On February 24, 2023, the band announced they had signed with Legend Recordings and would be releasing a new album the same year. They also released a new single titled "Blood in the Water" from their upcoming third album. On August 24, the band announced their third album, Seas of Oblivion, would be released on September 20.

== Band members ==
=== Current ===
- Dewey Bragg – vocals (2011–present)
- Mark Zavon – guitars (2011–present)
- Johnny Kelly – drums (2014–present)
- Matt Snell – bass (2021–present)

=== Former ===
- Rex Brown – bass (2011–2019)
- Vinny Appice – drums (2011–2014)
- Nico D'Arnese – bass (2019–2021)

== Discography ==
- Kill Devil Hill (2012)
- Revolution Rise (2013)
- Seas of Oblivion (2023)

== Trivia ==
- In July 2015, Texas Hippie Coalition bassist John Exall started a new musical ensemble called Smoke Hollow along with three musicians: Ashes from Static-X, Dewey Bragg from Kill Devil Hill, and Ralf Mueggler from Crowned by Fire.
- Kill Devil Hills, North Carolina, the town the band is named after, is best known as the site of the Wright brothers's first failed attempt at flying, resulting in the destruction of their catapulted projectile.
