= Sick Bubblegum =

Single by Rob Zombie

from the album Hellbilly Deluxe 2
- Released: October 3, 2009
- Recorded: 2008
- Genre: Hard rock; heavy metal; shock rock
- Length: 3:44
- Label: Roadrunner
- Songwriters: Rob Zombie, John 5

Rob Zombie singles chronology
"What?" (2009)	"Sick Bubblegum" (2009)	"Dead City Radio and the New Gods of Supertown" (2013)

Audio
- "Sick Bubblegum" on YouTube

Audio
- "Sick Bubblegum (Skrillex remix)" on YouTube

"Sick Bubblegum" is a song by American rock singer Rob Zombie. It was written by Zombie and John 5, and released on October 3, 2009 as the second and final single from his fourth solo album Hellbilly Deluxe 2.

== Production ==
On October 3, 2009 at 9:31 AM, Zombie allowed others to preview the song by posting a link to it via his Twitter page. “Check out the new ZOMBIE track SICK BUBBLEGUM”.

== Release ==
It was released on January 8, 2010 over Roadrunner Records/Loud & Proud Records and on January 22, 2010 the video premiered at AOL Noiscreep. Skrillex has released a remix of the song, which can be found on some web sites.

== Credits ==
Music

- Rob Zombie – vocals
- John 5 – guitar
- Piggy D. – bass
- Tommy Clufetos – drums
