= Patty Friedmann =

American novelist

- Born: October 29, 1946 (age 79)
- Education: Isidore Newman School; Temple University; University of Denver

Website
- pattyfriedmann.com

Patty Friedmann (born October 29, 1946) is a New Orleans–based dark comic novelist.

== Early life ==
Friedmann was born in New Orleans, Louisiana. She attended Isidore Newman School and is a 1968 graduate of Smith College. She holds a master's degree from Temple University and conducted doctoral work at the University of Denver.

== Career ==
Friedman's first novel The Exact Image of Mother was published in 1991 by Viking and is no longer in print. Eleanor Rushing, published in 1998 by Counterpoint, was a Barnes & Noble Discover New Writers selection, and a Borders Original Voices selection. In 2000 she wrote Odds, which was published by Counterpoint.

Friedman's novel Secondhand Smoke was published in 2004 by Counterpoint, and was a 2005 Berkley Signature, BookSense 76 selection. It was cited by Oxford American as one of 30 Most Underrated Southern Books. Later books were Side Effects published in 2006 by Avalon, A Little Bit Ruined 2007 Avalon, Taken Away 2010 Tiny Satchel Press, and Too Jewish 2010 booksBnimble. "Do Not Open for 50 Years" 2015 BBN. She also is the author of the comedic book, Too Smart to Be Rich, published in 1988 by the New Chapter Press, syndicated by The New York Times (not in print).

Friedmann has contributed essays, short stories, and reviews to such publications as Newsweek, Publishers Weekly, Oxford American, Speakeasy, Horn Gallery, New Orleans Review, Short Story, and Louisiana Literature, and has been included in the anthologies The Great New American Writers Cookbook, Above Ground, Christmas Stories from Louisiana, My New Orleans, New Orleans Noir, and Life in the Wake. Her stage pieces have been part of Native Tongues. She was the featured subject of the year-end issue of Riverbend Review in 2009.

== Personal ==
Friedman was previously married to Robert Skinner from 1979 to 1995, and married Edward Muchmore in 1999. They divorced in 2006. She has two children, Esme Roberson and Werner Friedmann II. Her three grandchildren are Summer Roberson, Kennedy Friedmann, and Carmine Friedmann.
