= And Hell Will Follow Me =

Studio album by A Pale Horse Named Death
- Released: 2010; June 14, 2011
- Genre: Gothic metal; doom metal; alternative metal
- Length: 53:37; 57:15 (vinyl version)
- Label: SPV America
- Producer: Matt Brown

A Pale Horse Named Death chronology
And Hell Will Follow Me (2010)	Lay My Soul to Waste (2013)

And Hell Will Follow Me is the debut album by American metal band A Pale Horse Named Death. It was originally released in 2010 in a slightly different, glossy digipak with the booklet signed by Sal Abruscato. The wide release came out in 2011.

== Track listing ==
The vinyl version of And Hell Will Follow Me

Written by Sal Abruscato.

1. "And Hell Will Follow Me" – 0:57
2. "As Black as My Heart" – 4:32
3. "To Die in Your Arms" – 3:36
4. "Heroin Train" – 3:10
5. "Devil in the Closet" – 3:42
6. "Cracks in the Walls" – 5:40
7. "Bad Dream" (instrumental) – 2:06
8. "Bath in My Blood (Schizophrenia in Me)" – 2:25
9. "Pill Head" – 5:38
10. "Meet the Wolf" – 5:27
11. "Serial Killer" – 4:38
12. "When Crows Descend upon You" – 4:11
13. "Die Alone" – 7:35

Notes

- The vinyl version of the album features an exclusive bonus track titled "Pickup Truck" (3:38) between "Serial Killer" and "When Crows Descend upon You".

== Reception ==
Professional ratings
Review scores
Source	Rating
AllMusic	3.5/5 stars
Metal Kaoz	8/10
Pavillon 666	8.5/10 stars
Revolver	4.5/5 stars
With Guitars	8/10

Jonathan Barkan of Bloody Disgusting wrote "And Hell Will Follow Me is a throwback to an era when rock and metal wasn't afraid to face, and even laud, the darkness that lurked behind the scenes".

Chris Storey of With Guitars suggested that "If in your CD collection you own albums by the likes of Alice in Chains [and] Down and Clutch, then this album is for you".
