= Alexandrea Weis =

American novelist

Alexandrea Weis (born in New Orleans) is an American novelist.

She was educated as a nurse. She has written a number of novels about New Orleans.

Her unique style and ability to exquisitely define characters, makes her one of a growing number of popular writers from the region. She uses her experiences with the people and culture of the area to bring a new approach to New Orleans fiction. She has received national recognition and won several writing awards for her work.

She is married; they live in New Orleans.

== Books ==
- To My Senses, Booksurge LLC, 2007, ISBN 978-1-4196-6111-2
- Recovery, CreateSpace, 2011, ISBN 978-1-4538-7570-4
- Sacrifice, World Castle Publishing, 2011, ISBN 978-1-937593-16-2
- Broken Wings, World Castle Publishing, 2012, ISBN 978-1-937593-36-0
- The Secret Brokers, World Castle Publishing, 2012, ISBN 978-1-938243-60-8
- Diary of a One-Night Stand, World Castle Publishing, 2012, ISBN 978-1-938243-93-6
- Acadian Waltz, World Castle Publishing, 2013, ISBN 978-1-938961-78-6
- The Satyr's Curse, World Castle Publishing, 2013, ISBN 978-1-939865-36-6
- The Ghosts of Rue Dumaine, World Castle Publishing, 2013, ISBN 978-1-939865-64-9
- Cover to Covers, World Castle Publishing, 2014, ISBN 978-1-629890-52-4
- The Riding Master, World Castle Publishing, 2014, ISBN 978-1-629890-82-1
- The Bondage Club, WEBA Publishing, 2014, ISBN 978-1-500396-06-0
- The Satyr's Curse II: The Reckoning, World Castle Publishing, 2014, ISBN 978-1-629891-58-3
- That Night with You, WEBA Publishing, 2014, ISBN 978-1-502800-10-7
- Behind the Door, with M. Clarke, WEBA Publishing, 2015, ISBN 978-1-507722-81-7
- Taming Me, WEBA Publishing, 2015, ISBN 978-1-507613-02-3
- Rival Seduction, WEBA Publishing, 2015, ISBN 978-1-517070-07-6
- The Art of Sin, WEBA Publishing, 2015, ISBN 978-1-511694-68-1
- Dark Perception, WEBA Publishing, 2016, ISBN 978-1-523925-29-2
- Dark Attraction, WEBA Publishing, 2016, ISBN 978-1-532872-29-7
- His Dark Canvas, WEBA Publishing, 2016, ISBN 978-1-536808-59-9
- The Satyr's Curse III: Redemption, WEBA Publishing, 2016, ISBN 978-1-537334-81-3
- Blackwell, Vesuvian Books, 2017, ISBN 978-1-944109-24-0
- Her Dark Past, WEBA Publishing, 2017, ISBN 978-1-541365-24-7
- Damned: A Magnus Blackwell Novel Book 1, Vesuvian Books, 2017, ISBN 978-1-944109-44-8
- Bound: A Magnus Blackwell Novel Book 2, Vesuvian Books, 2018, ISBN 978-1-944109-61-5
- Death by the River, Vesuvian Books, 2018, ISBN 978-1-944109-14-1
- Seize: A Magnus Blackwell Novel Book 3, Vesuvian Books, 2019, ISBN 978-1-944109-88-2
- Realm, Vesuvian Books, 2019, ISBN 978-1-944109-48-6
- The Secret Brokers, Vesuvian Books, 2020, ISBN 978-1-944109-20-2
- Sisters of the Moon, Vesuvian Books, 2020. ISBN 978-1-645480-55-6
- The Christmas Spirit, Rosewind Books, 2020, ISBN 978-1-645480-41-9
- Have You Seen Me?, Vesuvian Books, 2021, ISBN 978-1-645480-75-4
- River of Ashes, Book 1 St. Benedict Series, Vesuvian Books, 2022, ISBN 978-1-645480-98-3
- River of Wrath, Book 2 St. Benedict Series, Vesuvian Books, 2023, ISBN 978-1-645480-17-4
