= List of tenors in non-classical music =

The tenor is a type of male singing voice and is the highest male voice within the modal register. The typical tenor voice lies between C_{3} (C one octave below middle C), to the high C (C_{5}). The low extreme for tenors is roughly A_{2} (two octaves below middle C). At the highest extreme, some tenors can sing up to F one octave above middle C (F_{5}) in full voice.

The term tenor was developed in relation to classical and operatic voices, where the classification is based not merely on the singer's vocal range but also on the tessitura and timbre of the voice. For classical and operatic singers, their voice type determines the roles they will sing and is a primary method of categorization. In non-classical music, singers are primarily defined by their genre and their gender and not by their vocal range. When the terms soprano, mezzo-soprano, contralto, tenor, baritone, and bass are used as descriptors of non-classical voices, they are applied more loosely than they would be to those of classical singers and generally refer only to the singer's perceived vocal range.

The following is a list of singers in various music genres and styles (most of which can be found on the List of popular music genres) who have been described as tenors.

== List of names ==
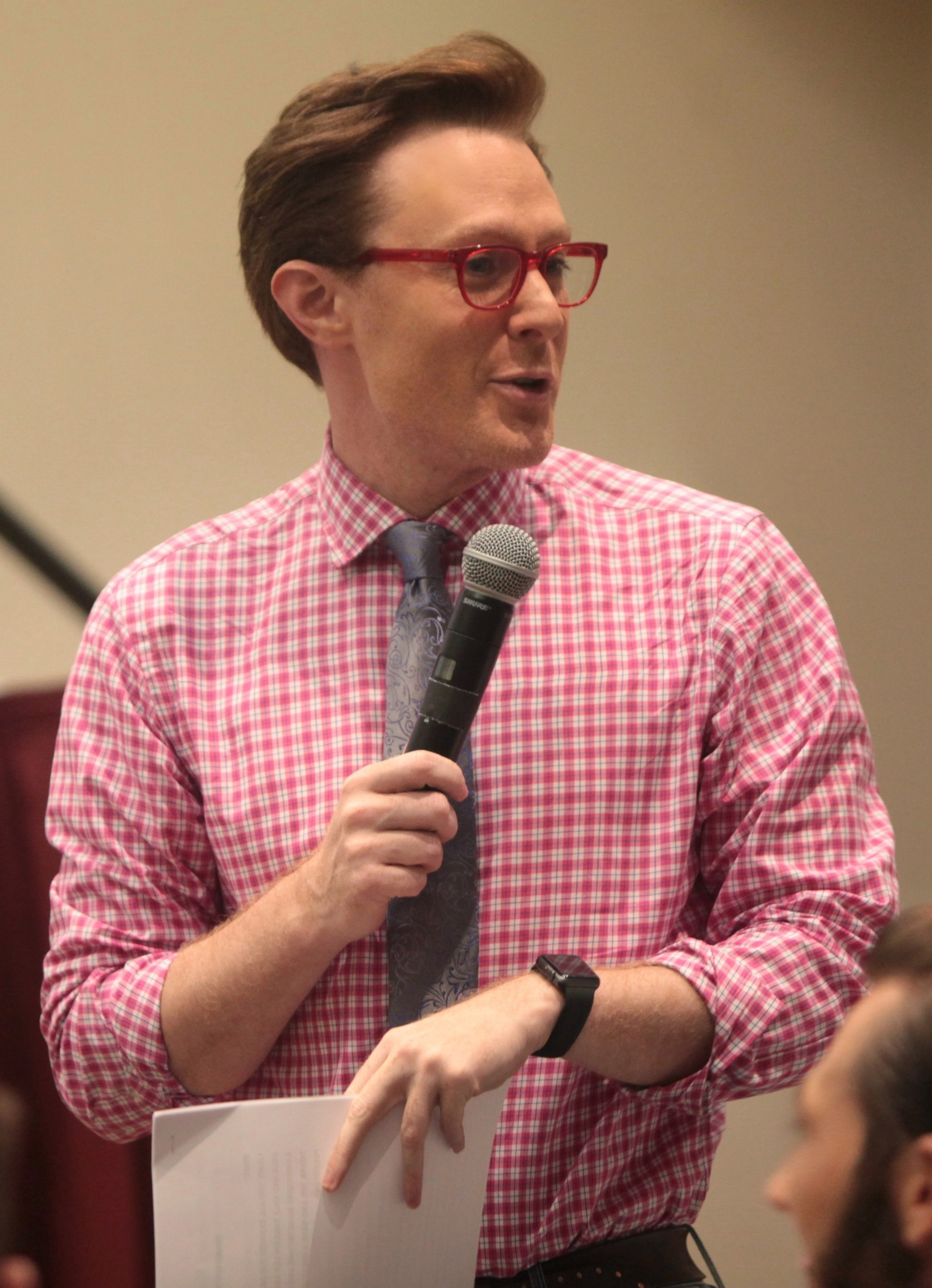
Clay Aiken

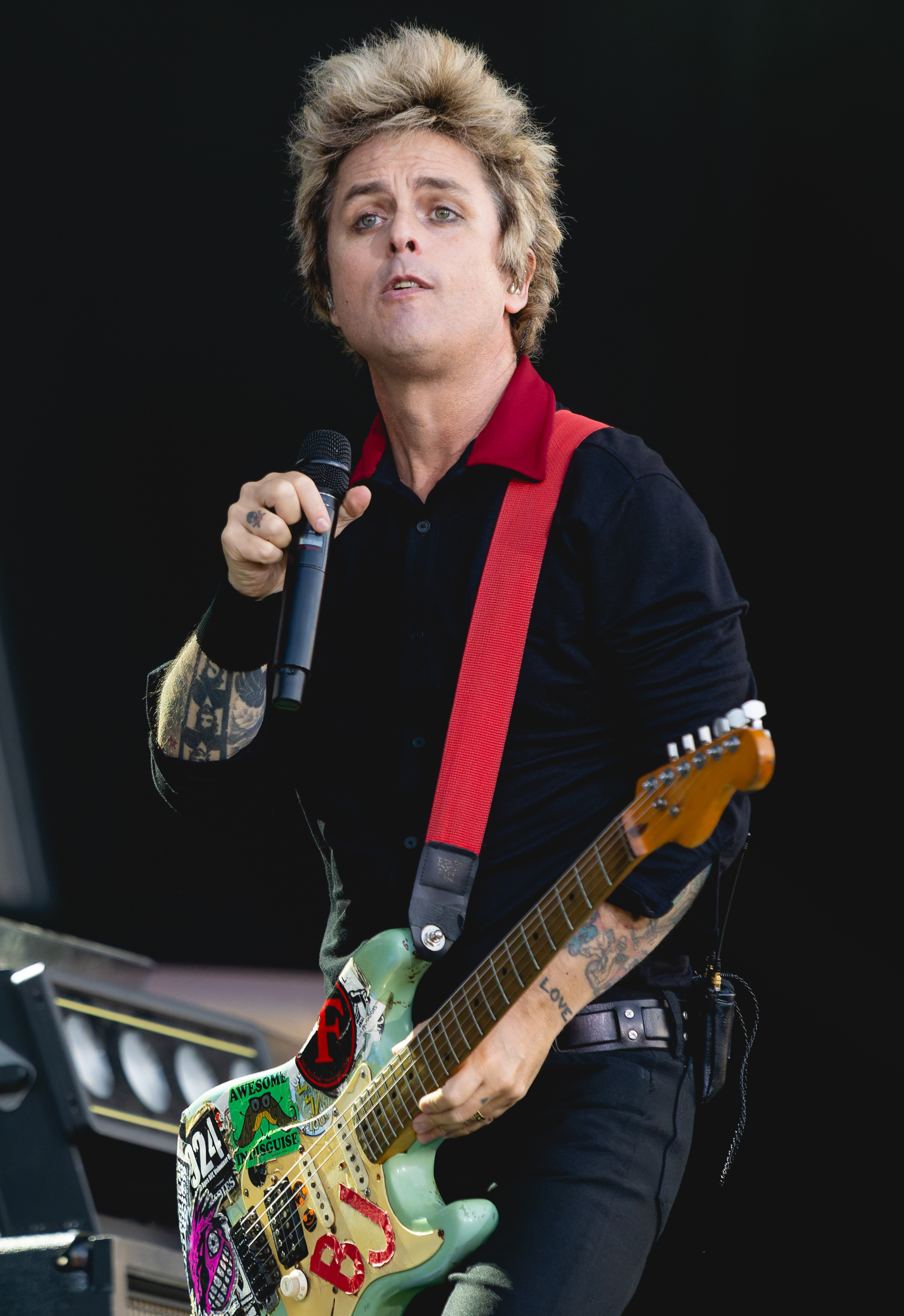
Billie Joe Armstrong

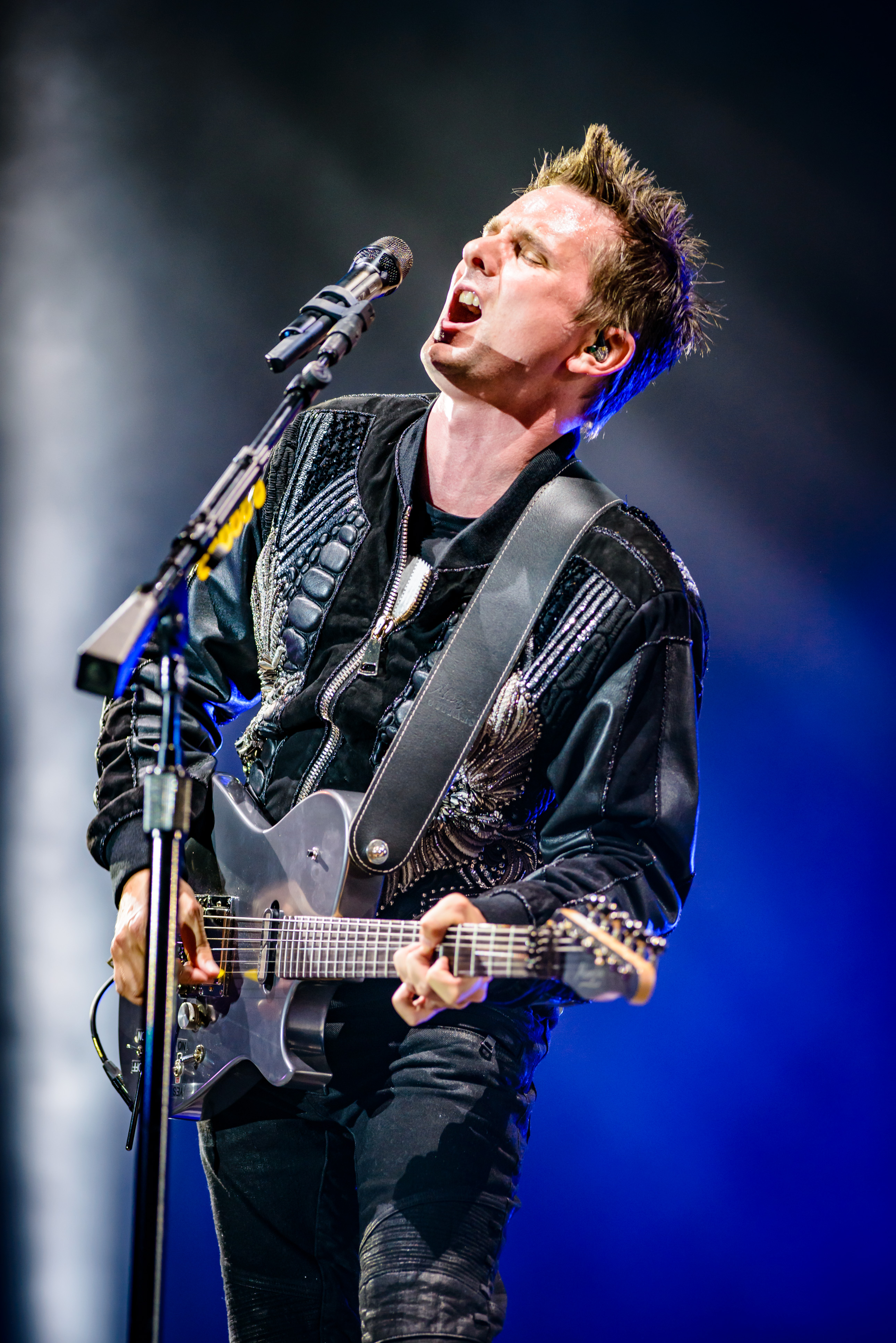
Matt Bellamy

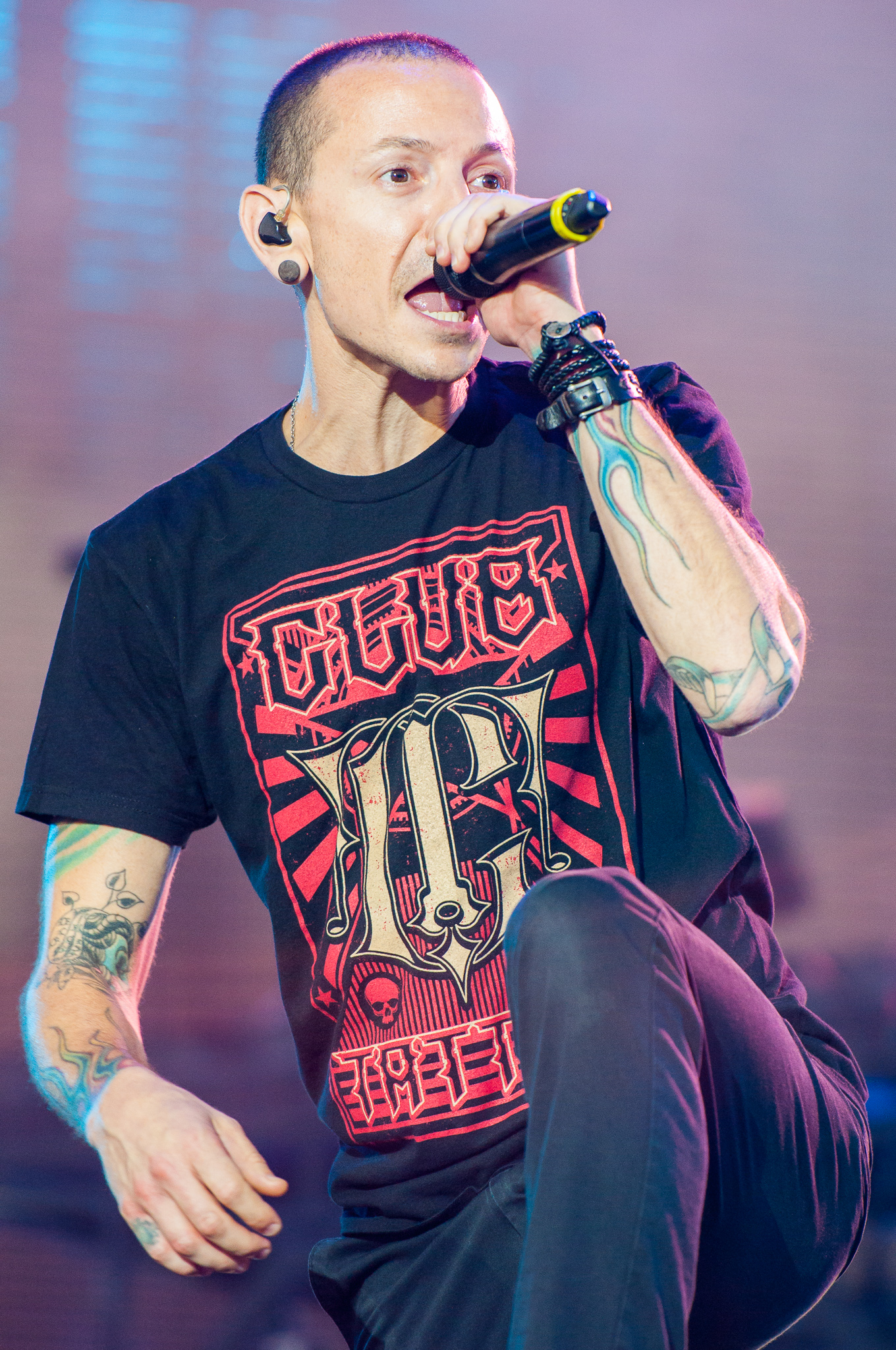
Chester Bennington

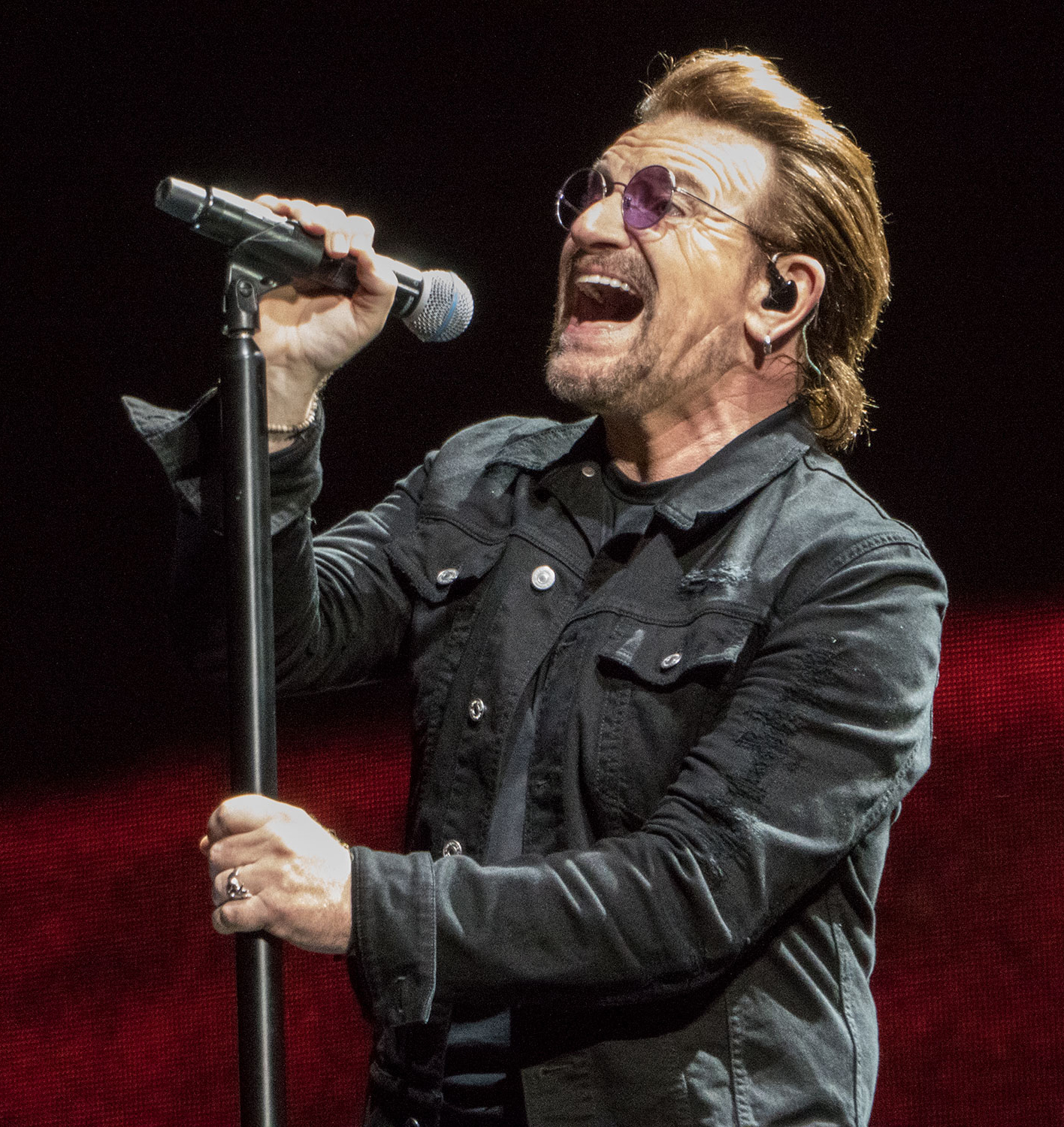
Bono

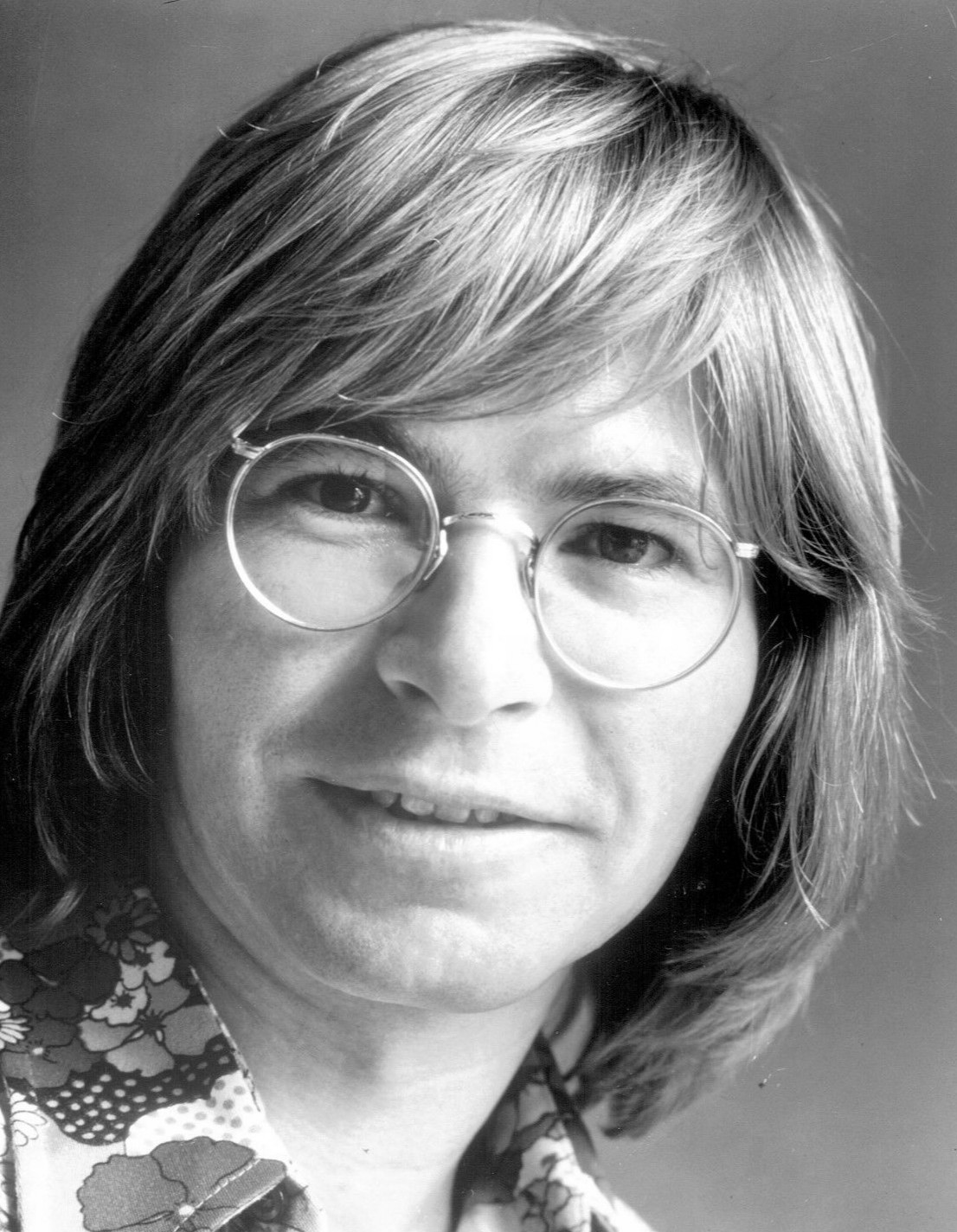
John Denver

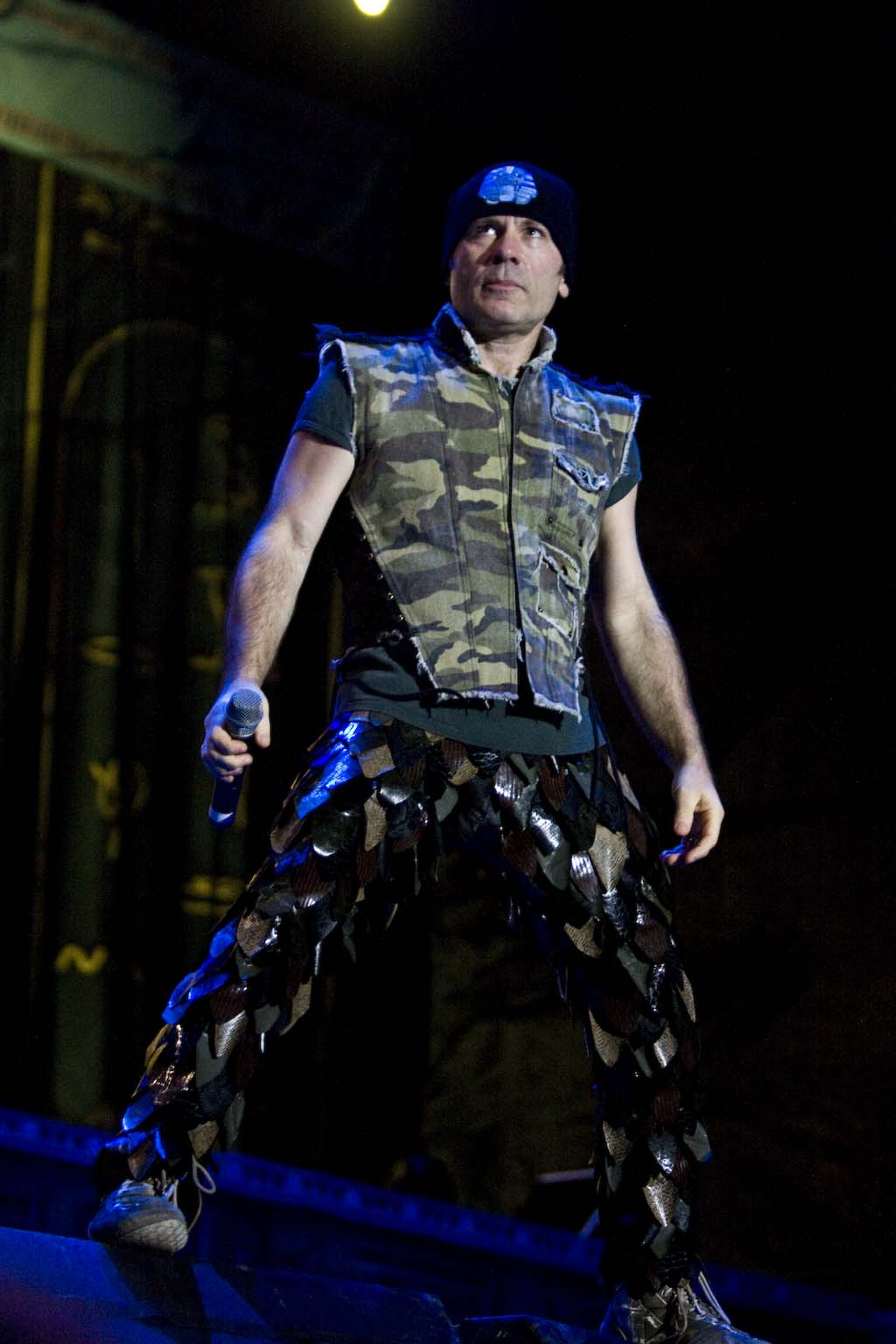
Bruce Dickinson

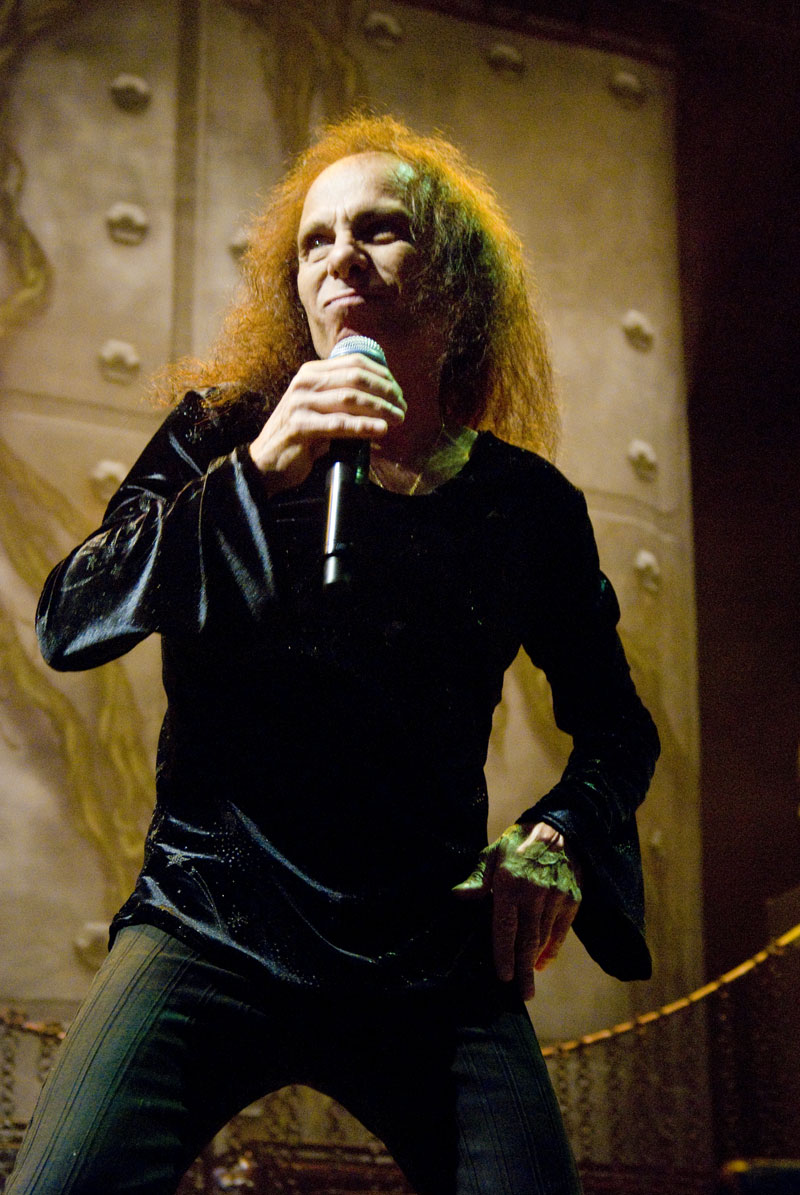
Ronnie James Dio

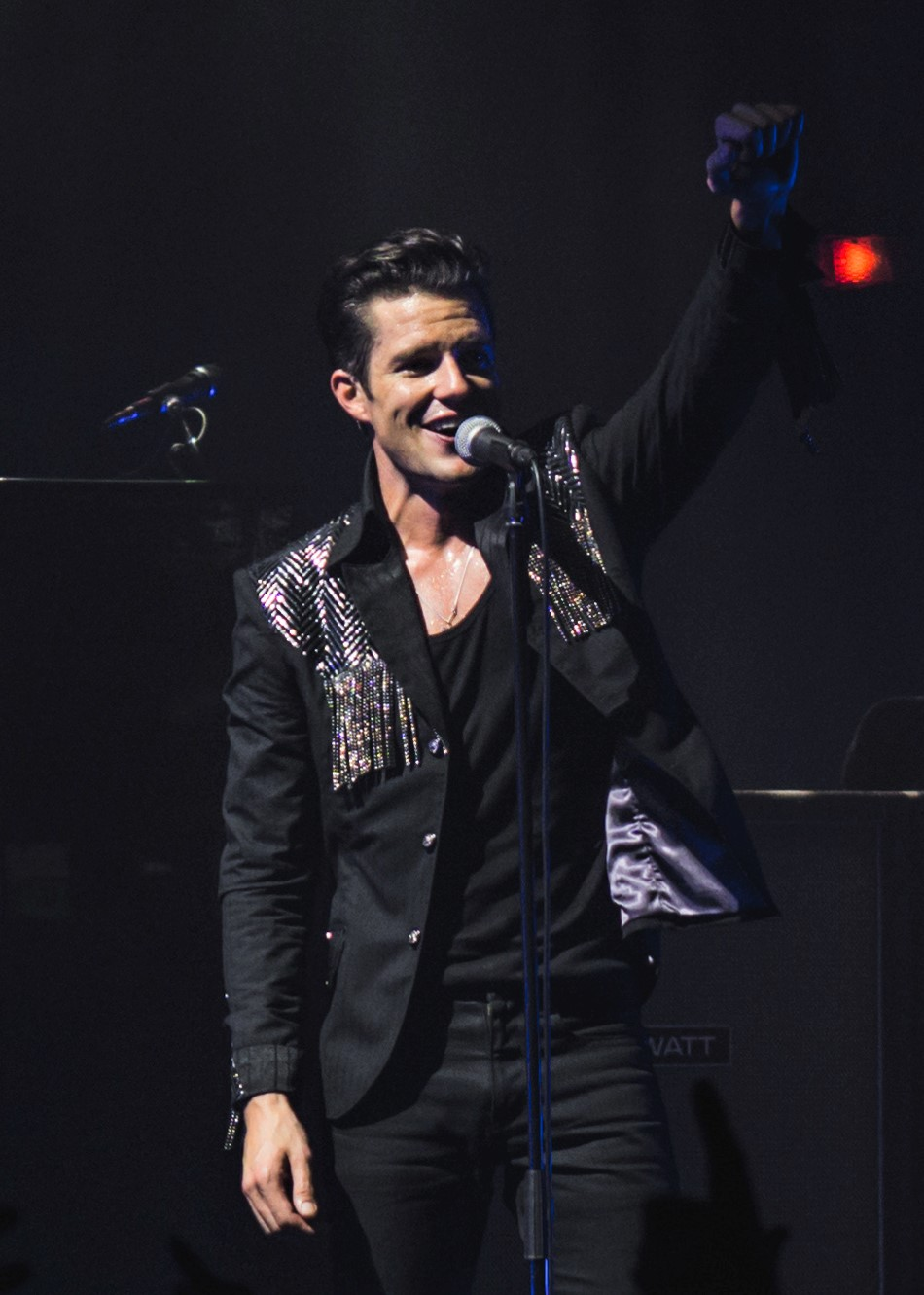
Brandon Flowers

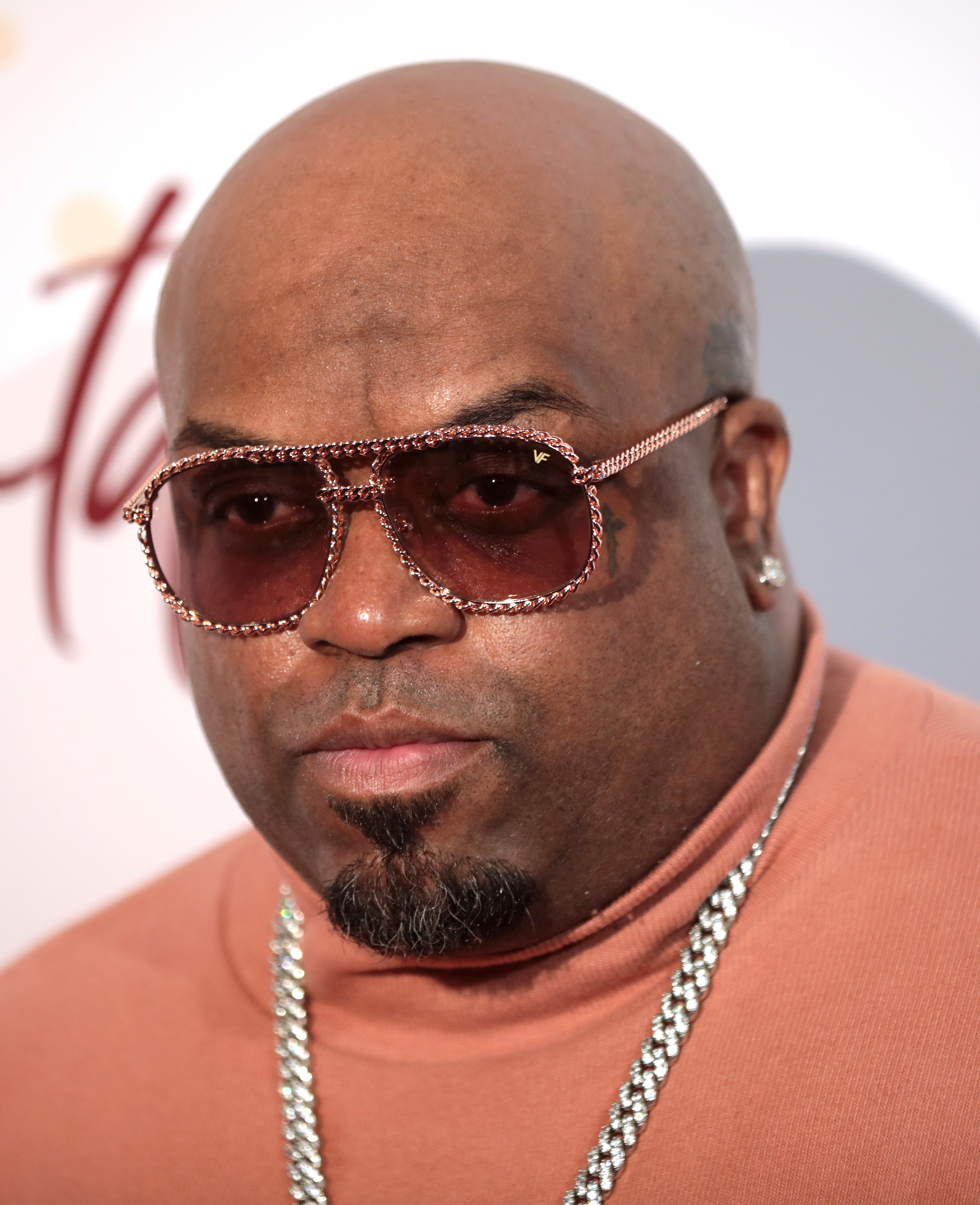
CeeLo Green

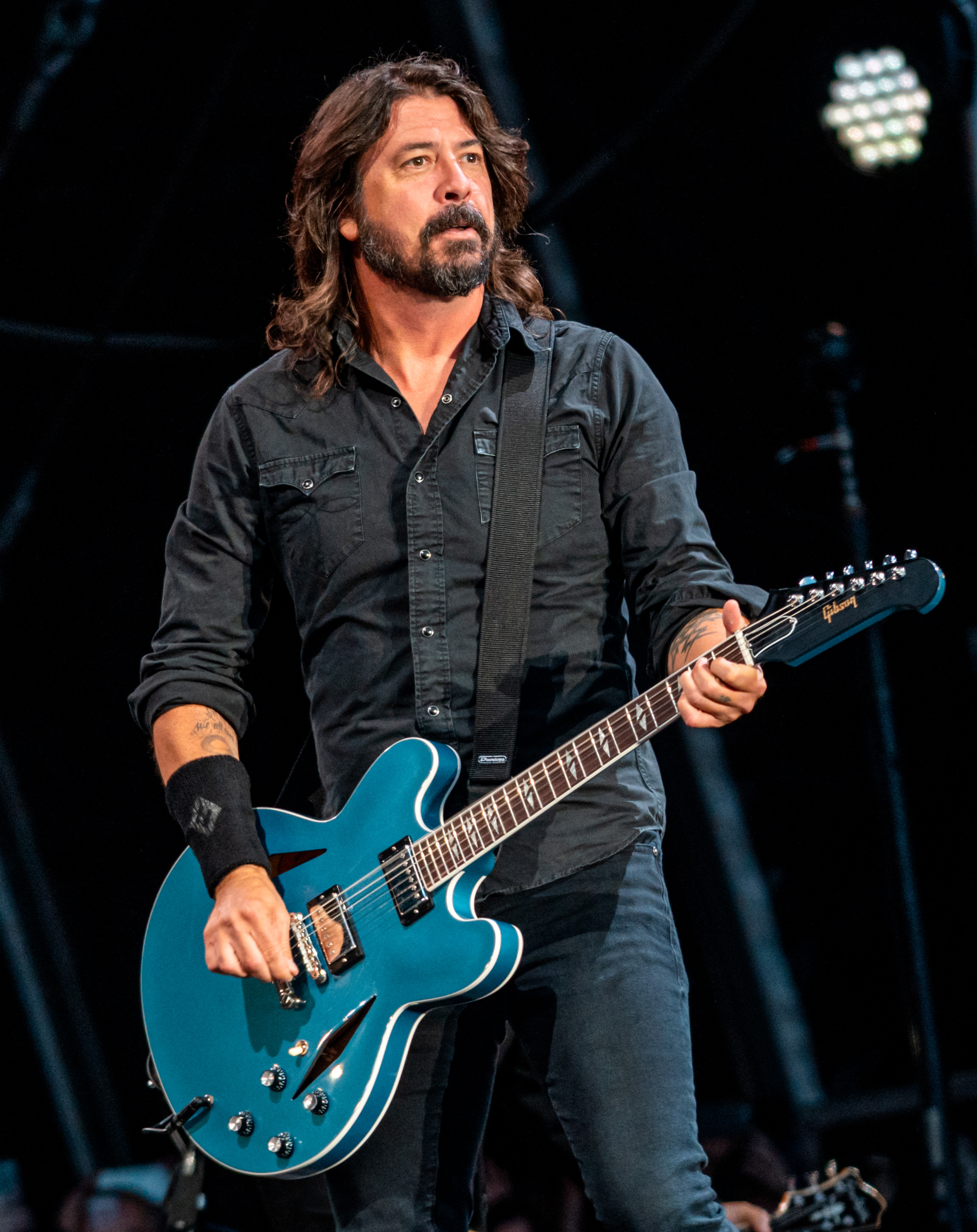
Dave Grohl

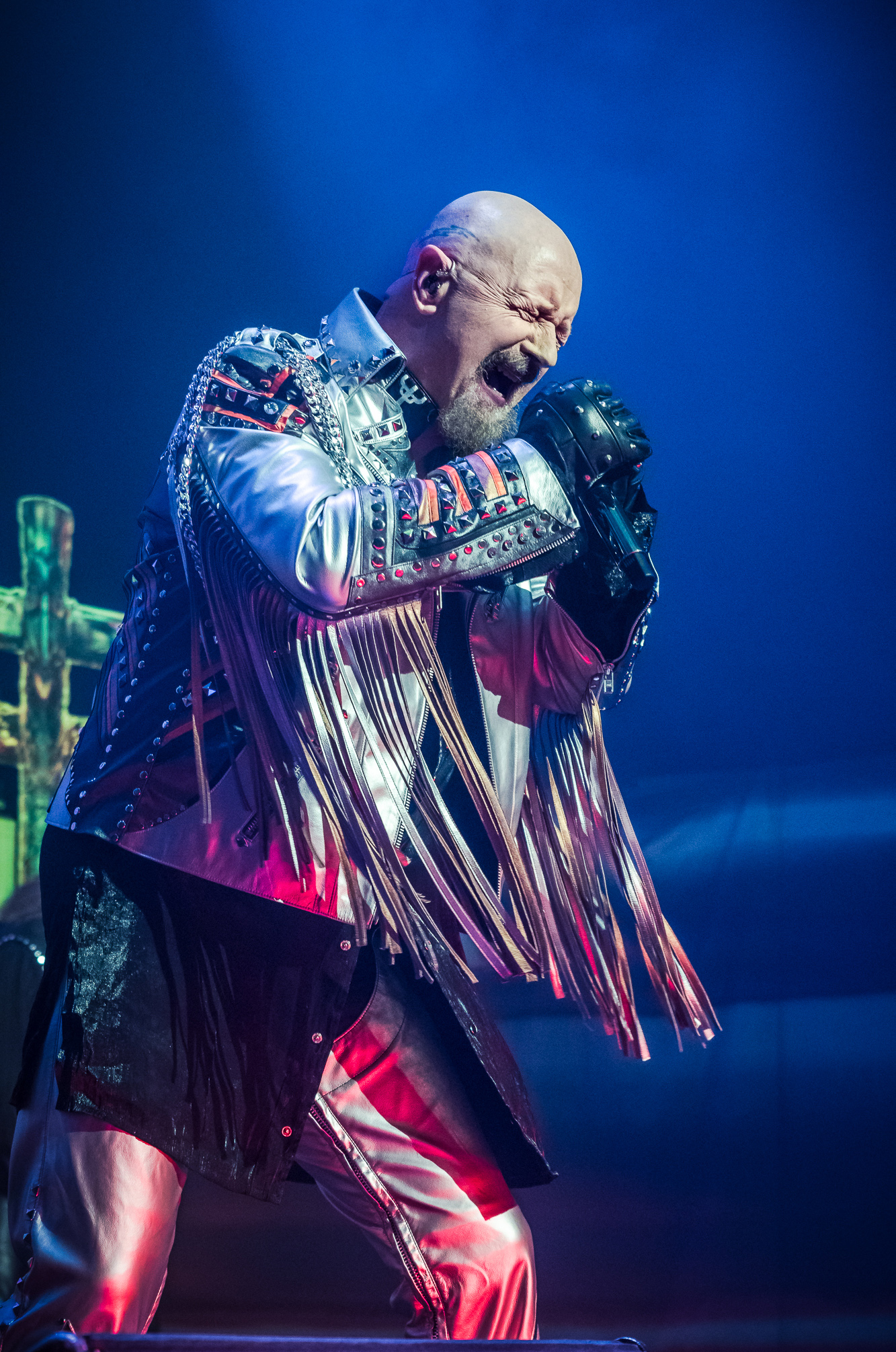
Rob Halford

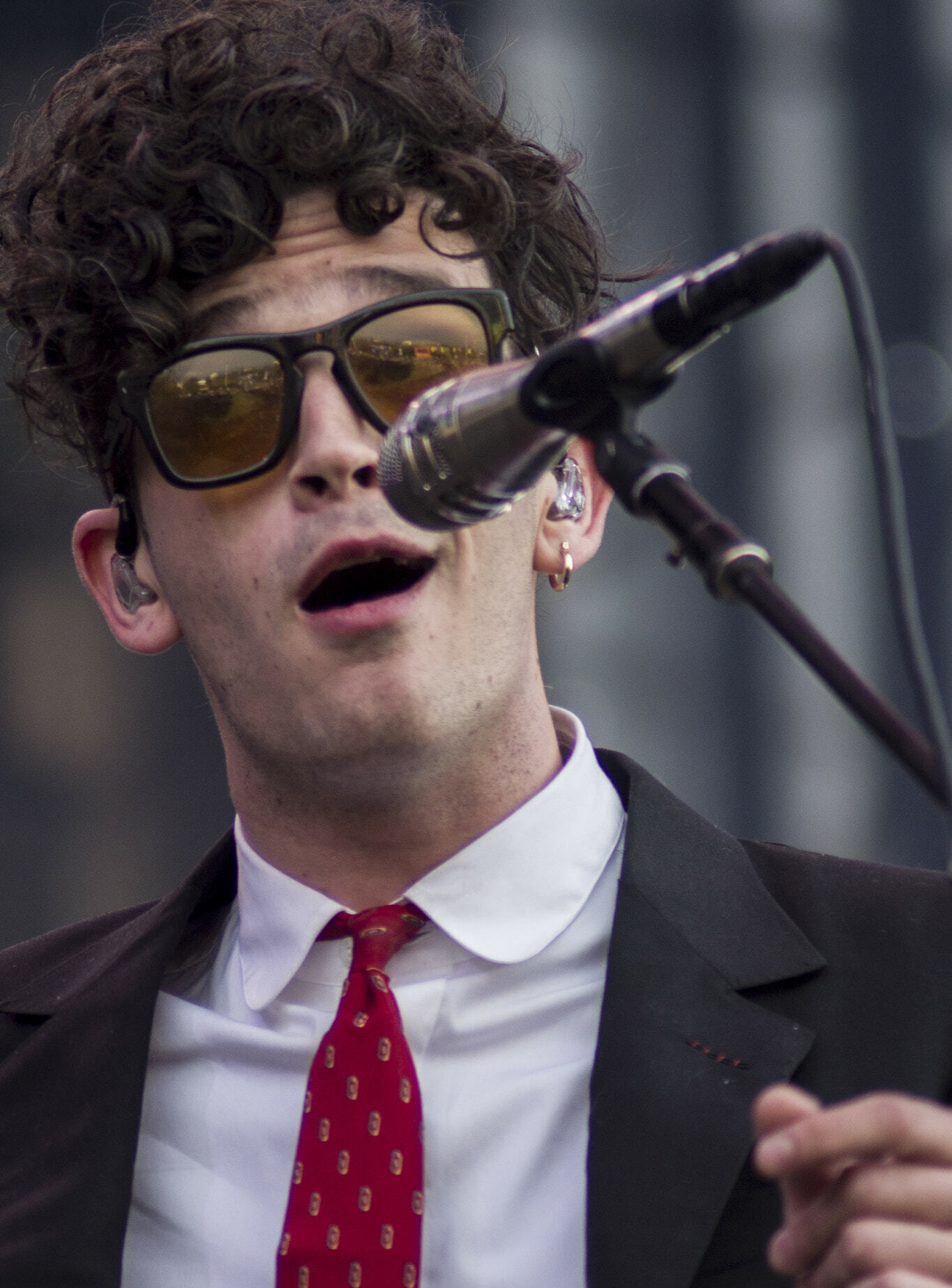
Matty Healy

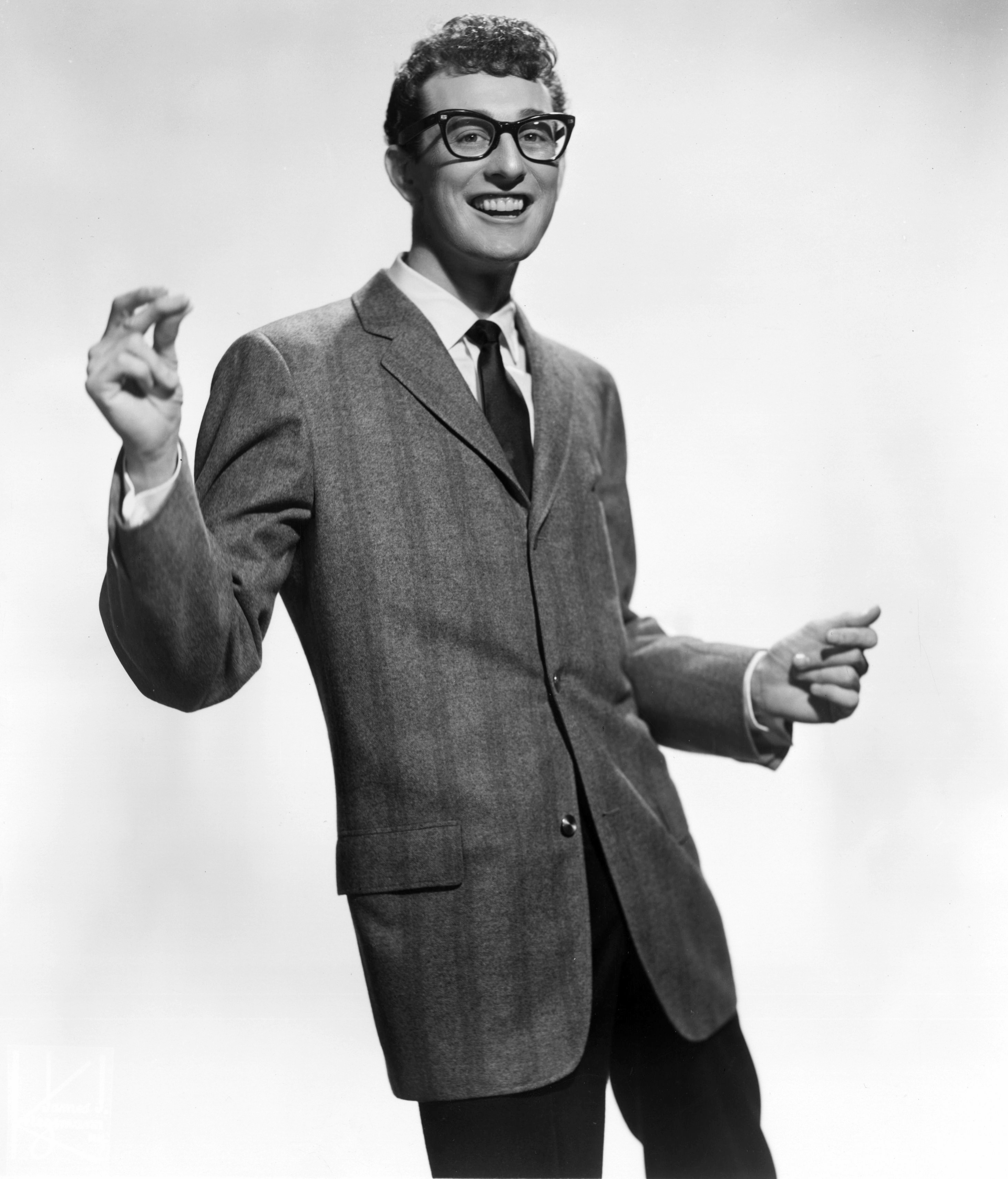
Buddy Holly

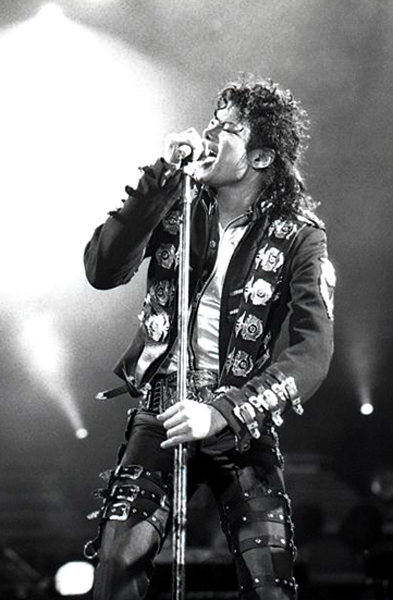
Michael Jackson

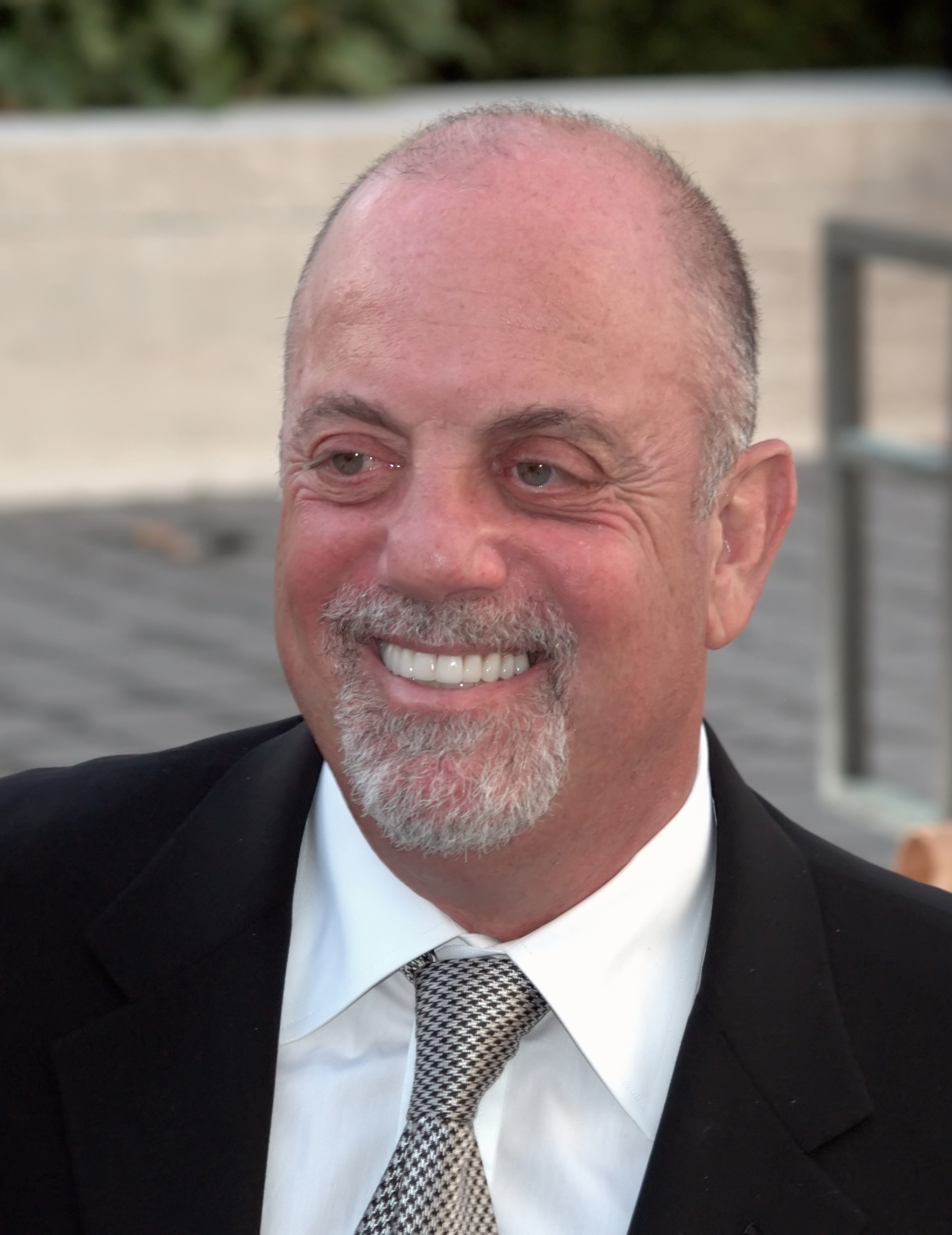
Billy Joel

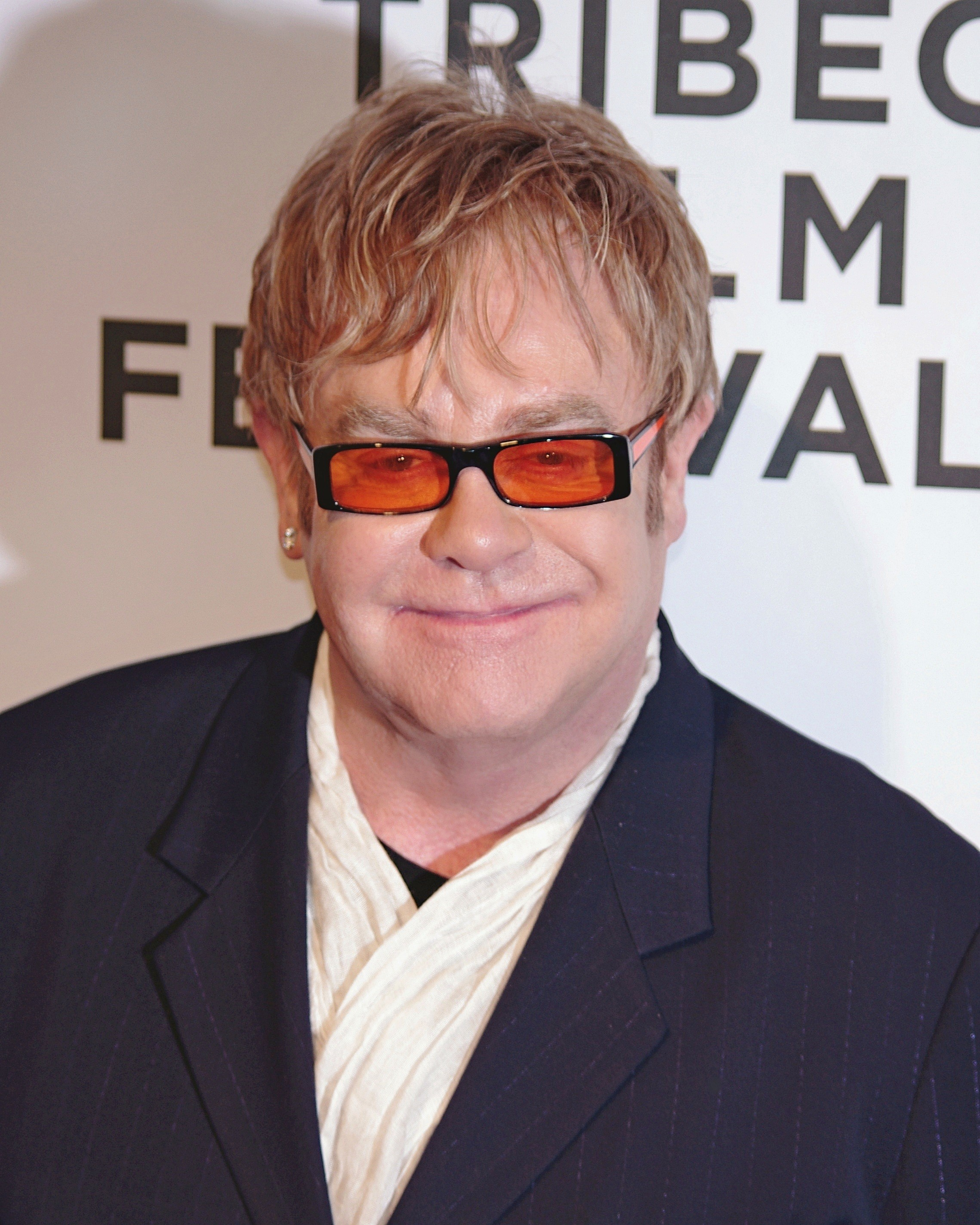
Elton John

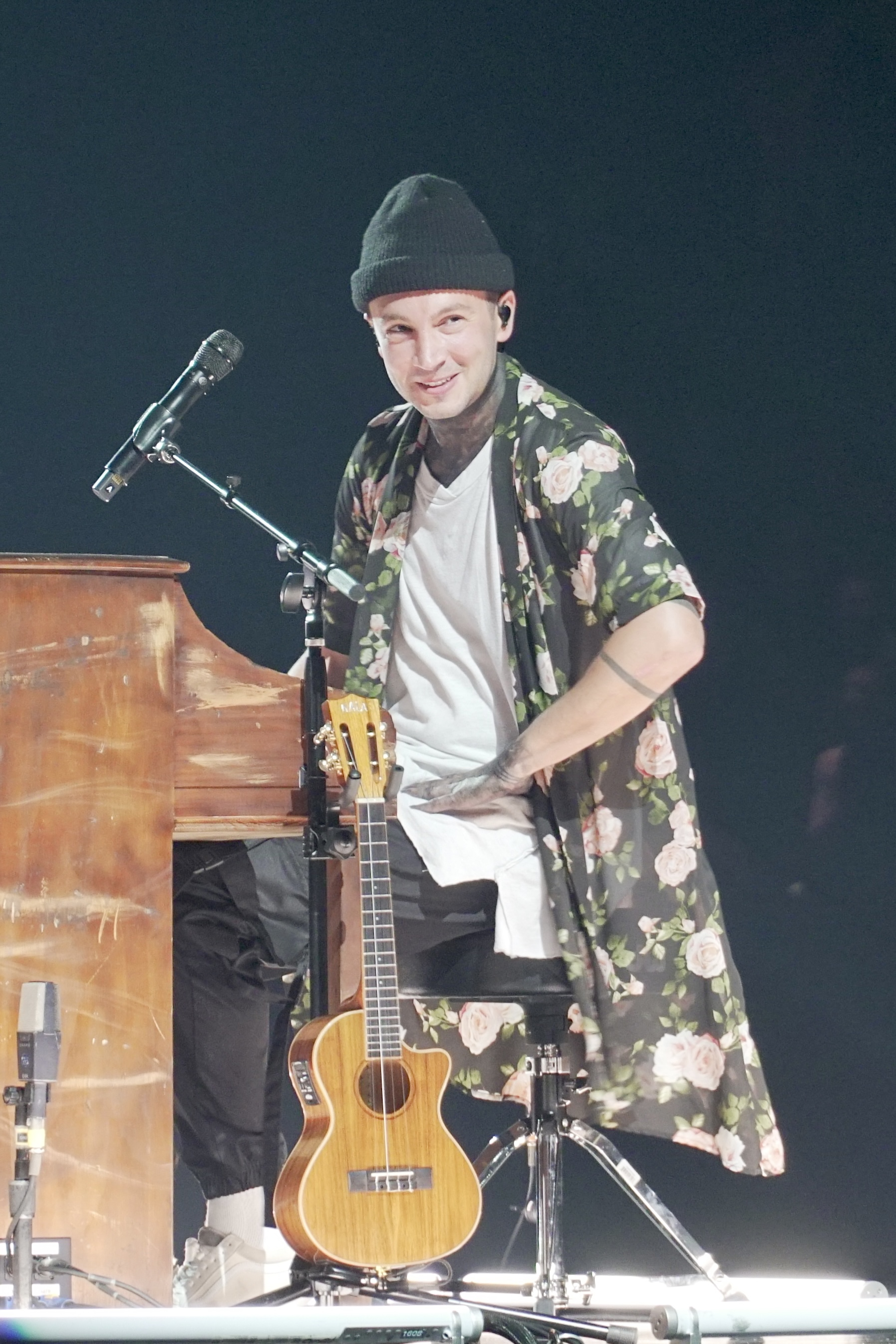
Tyler Joseph

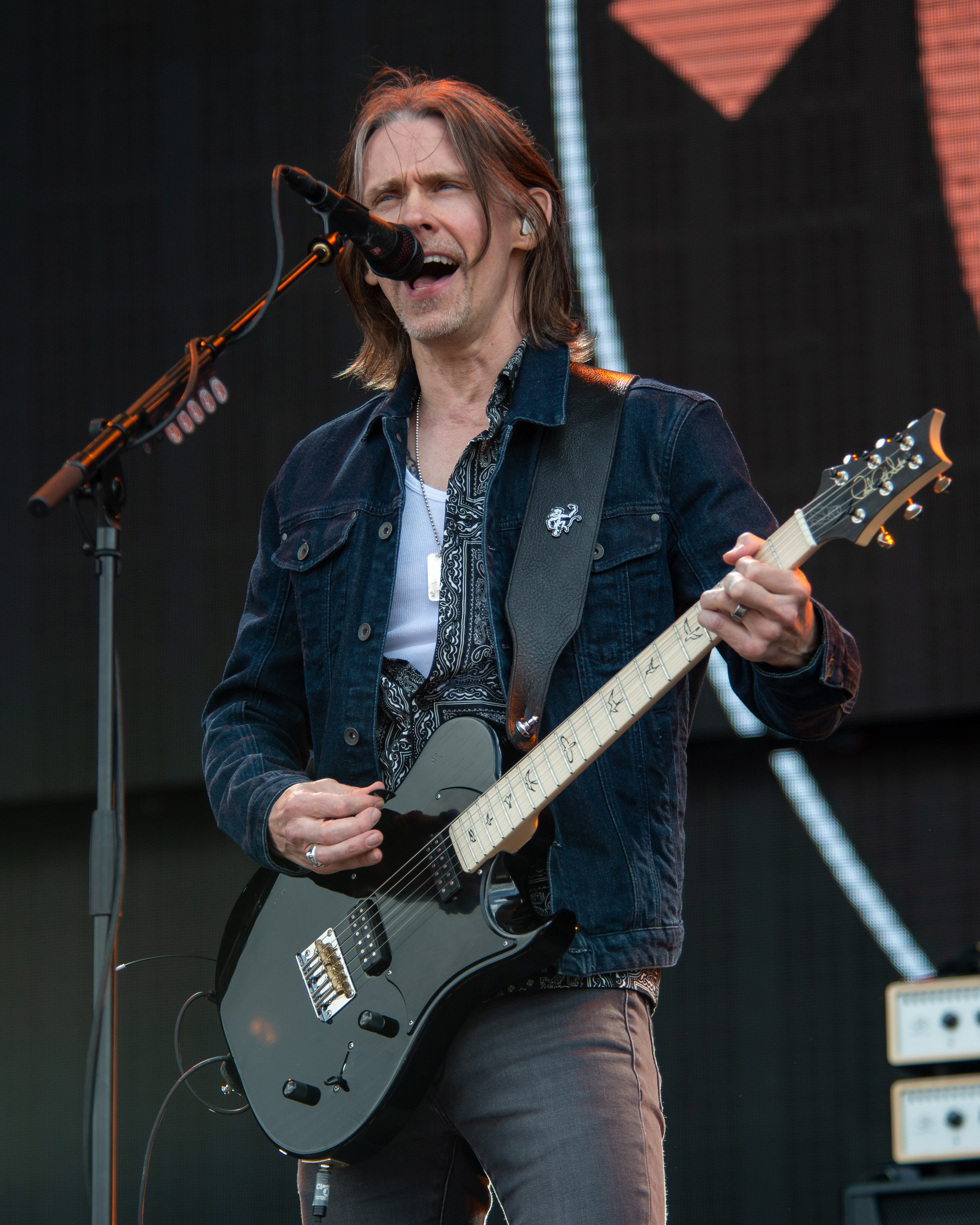
Myles Kennedy

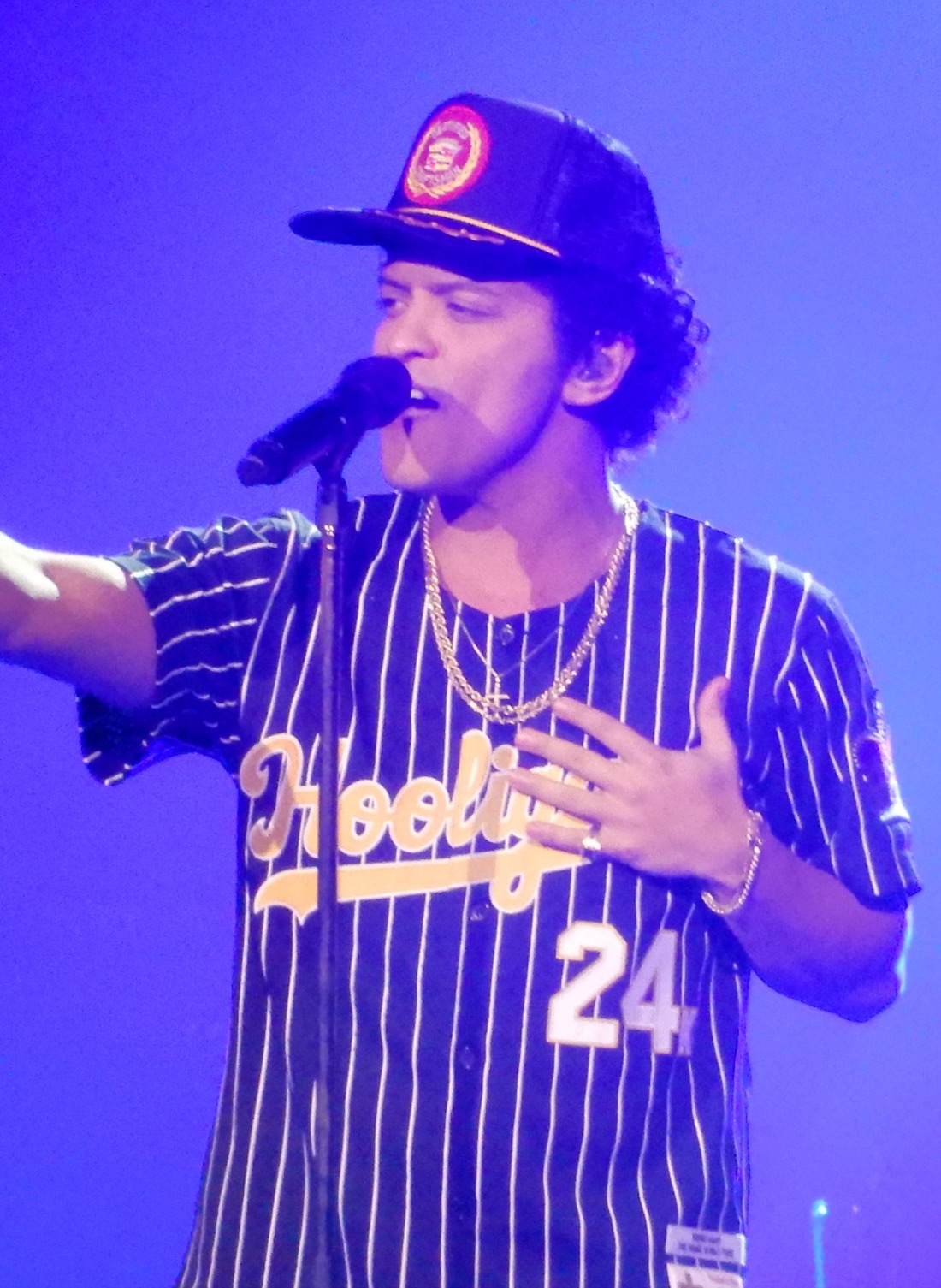
Bruno Mars

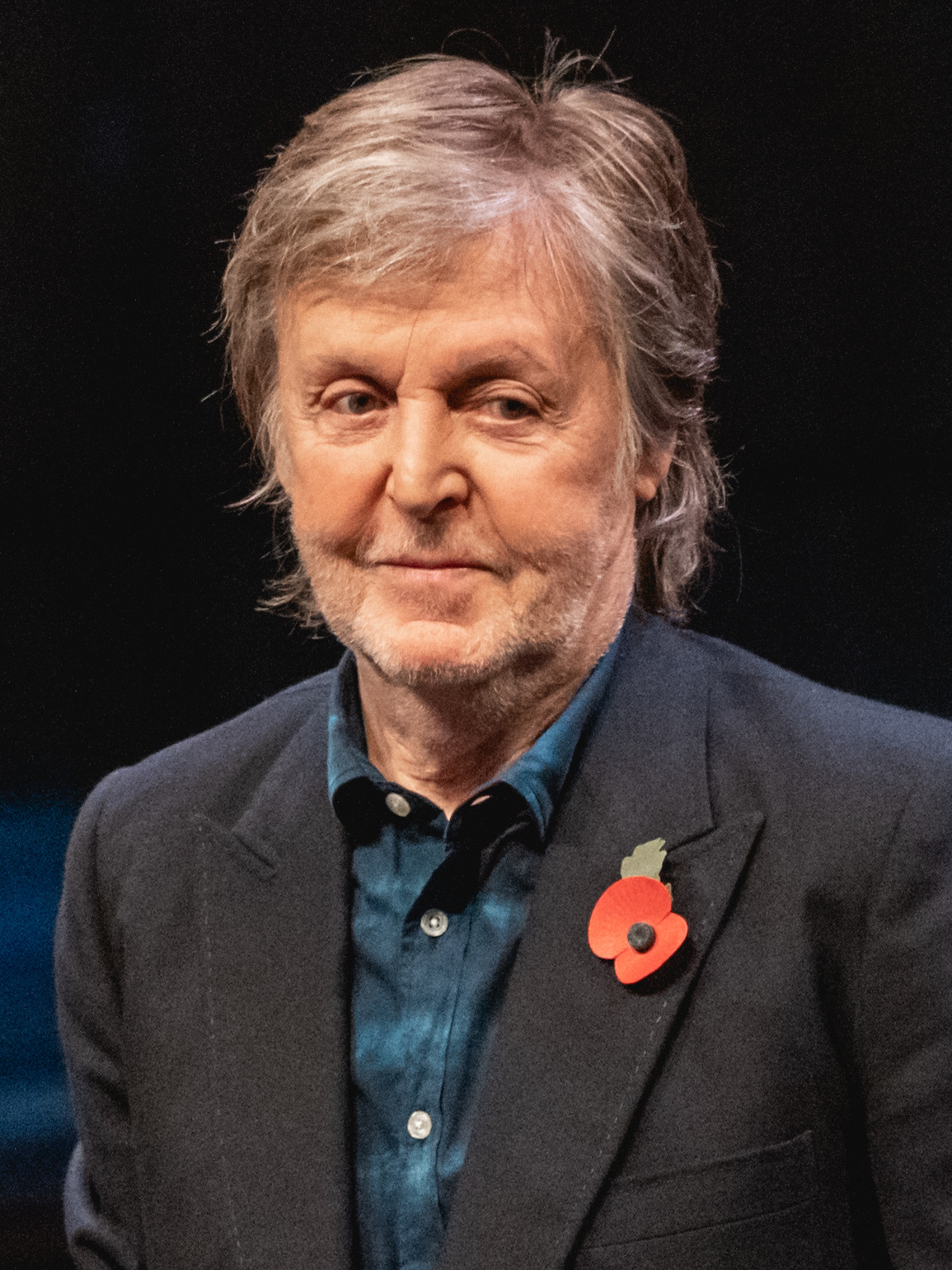
Paul McCartney

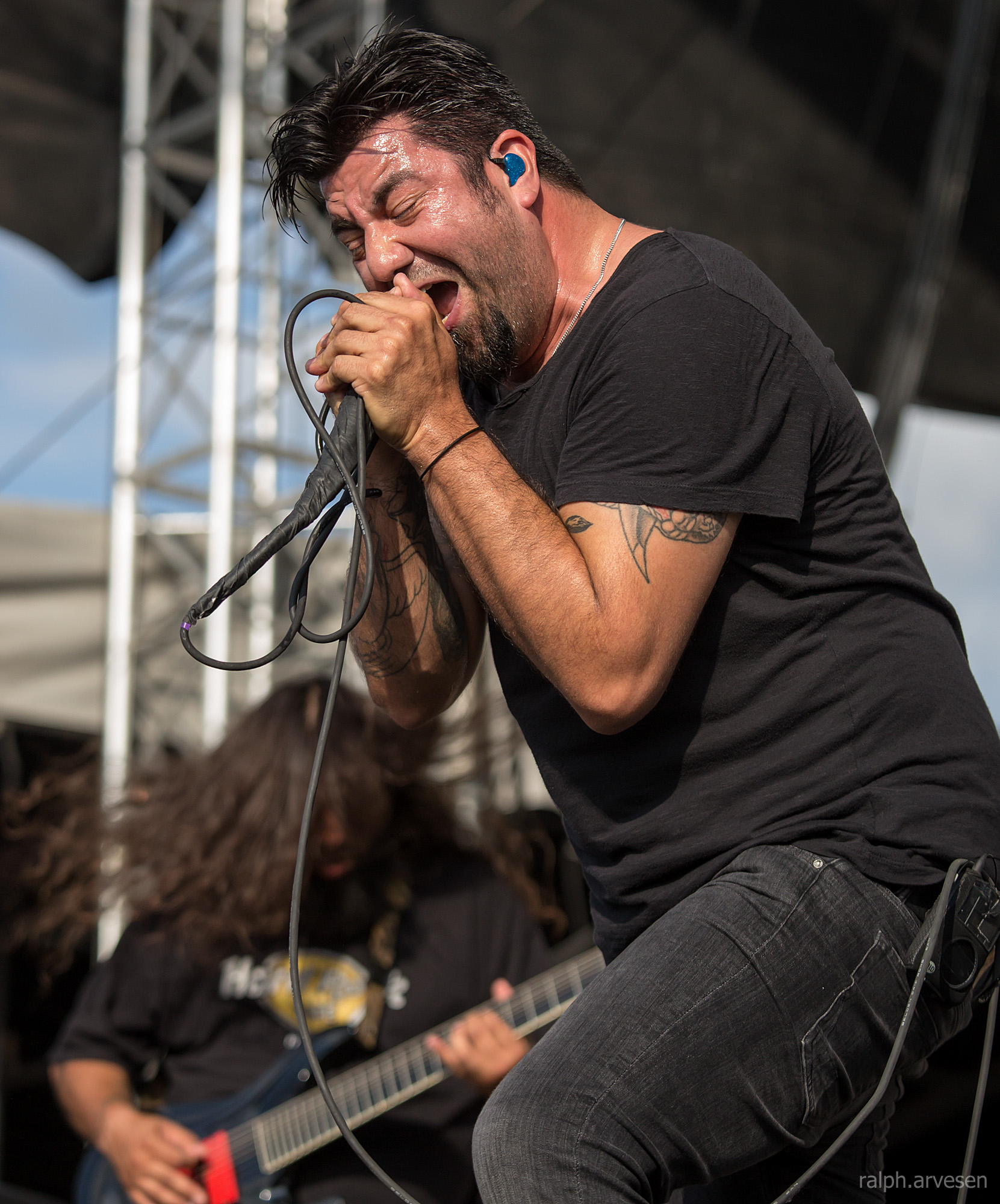
Chino Moreno

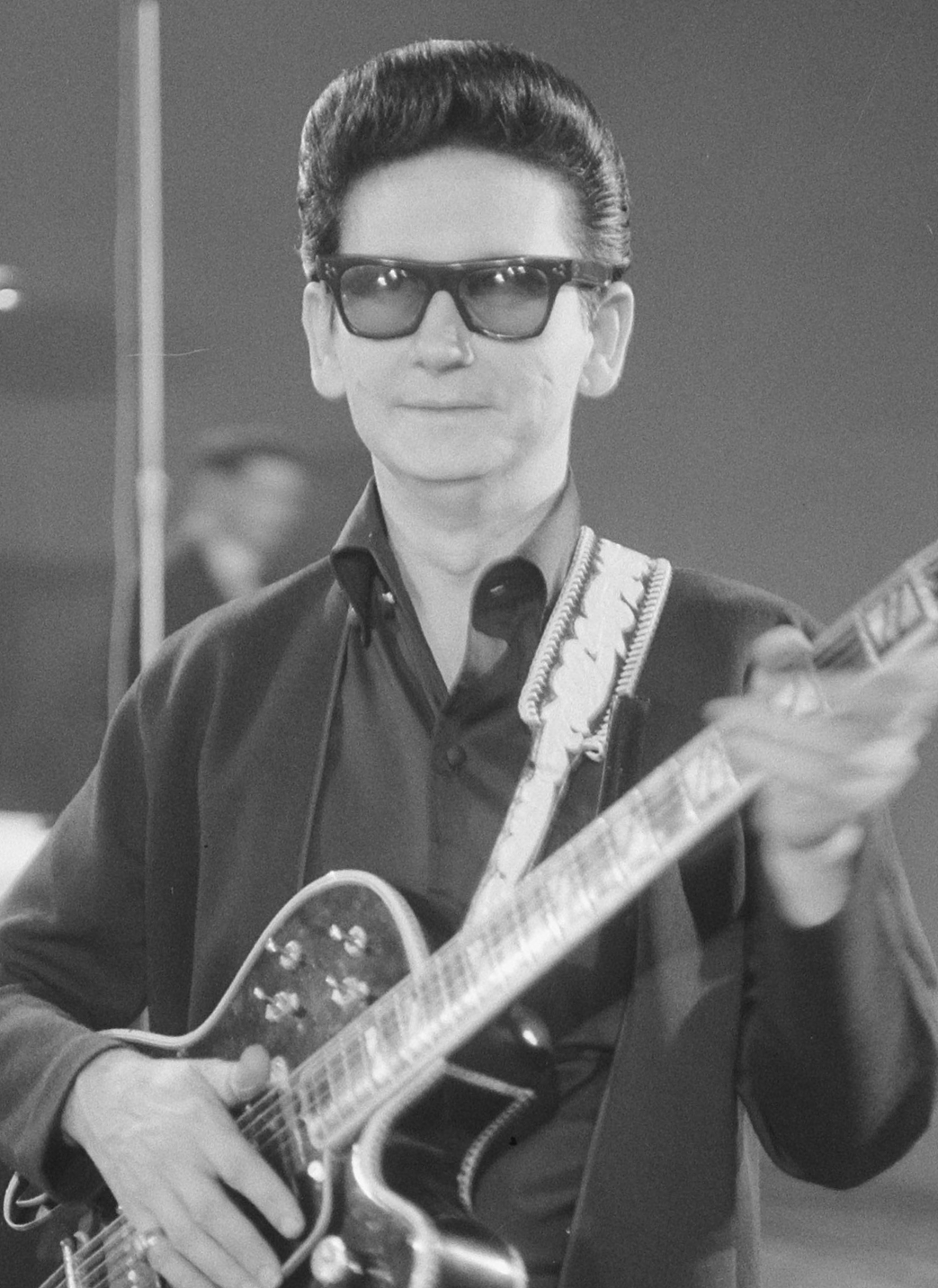
Roy Orbison

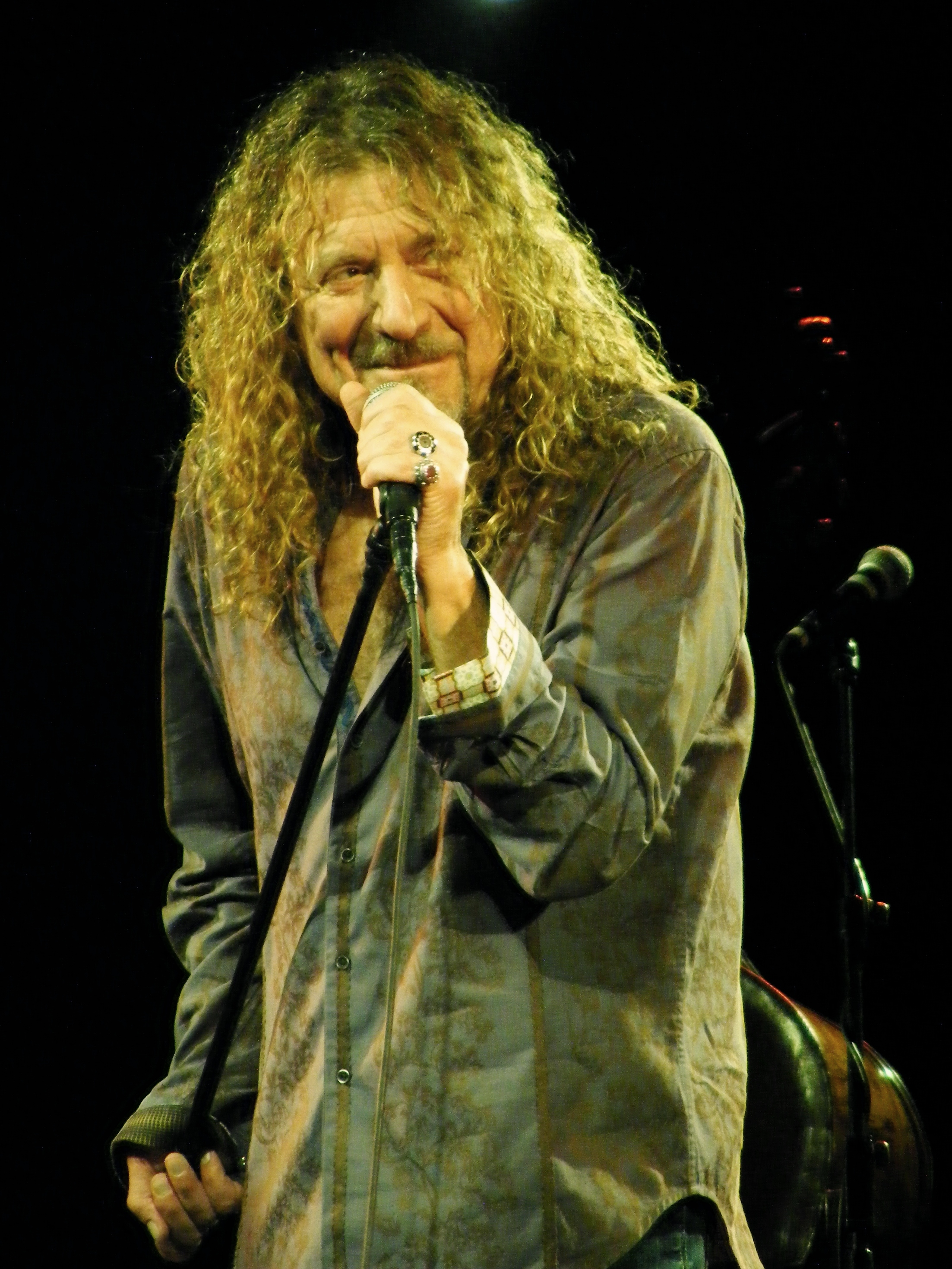
Robert Plant

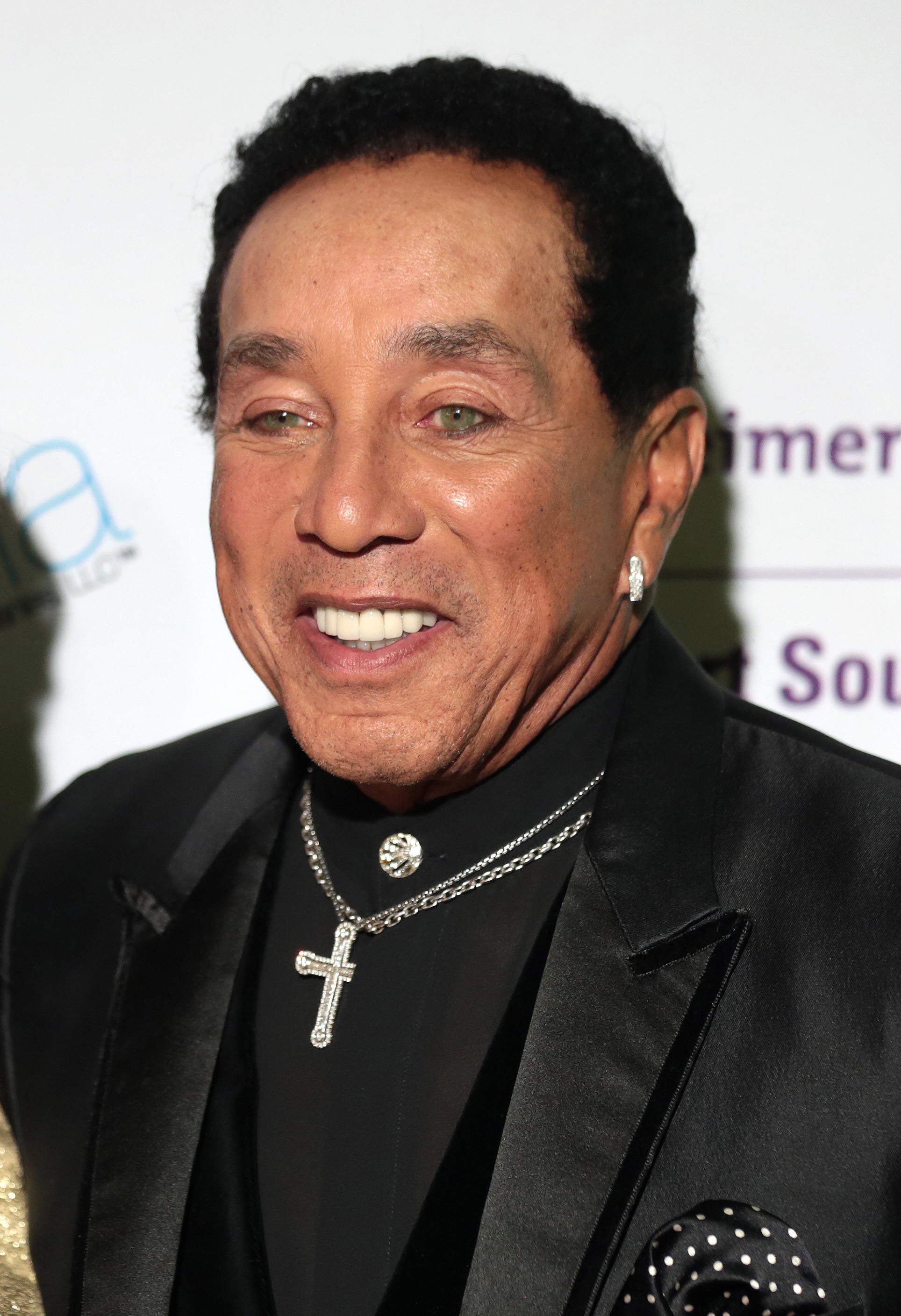
Smokey Robinson

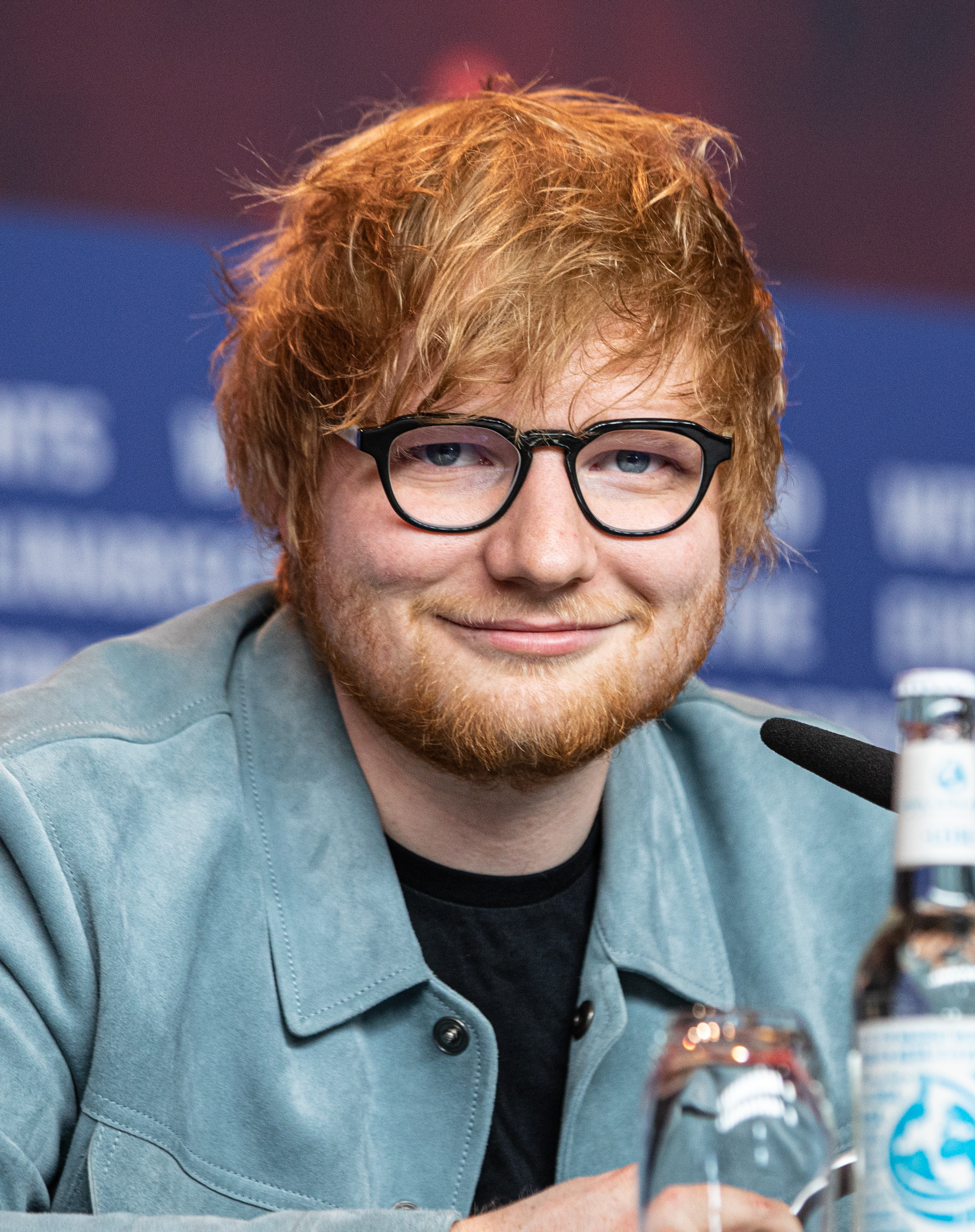
Ed Sheeran

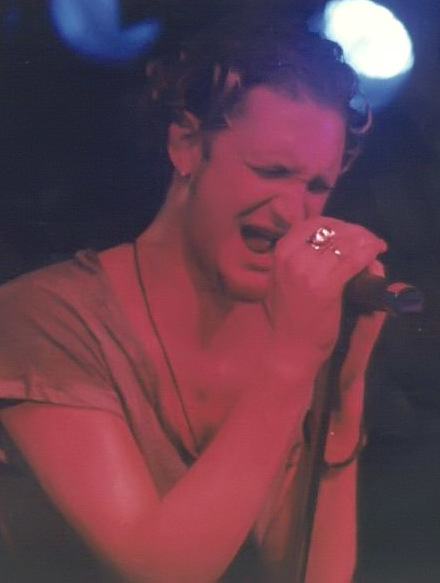
Layne Staley

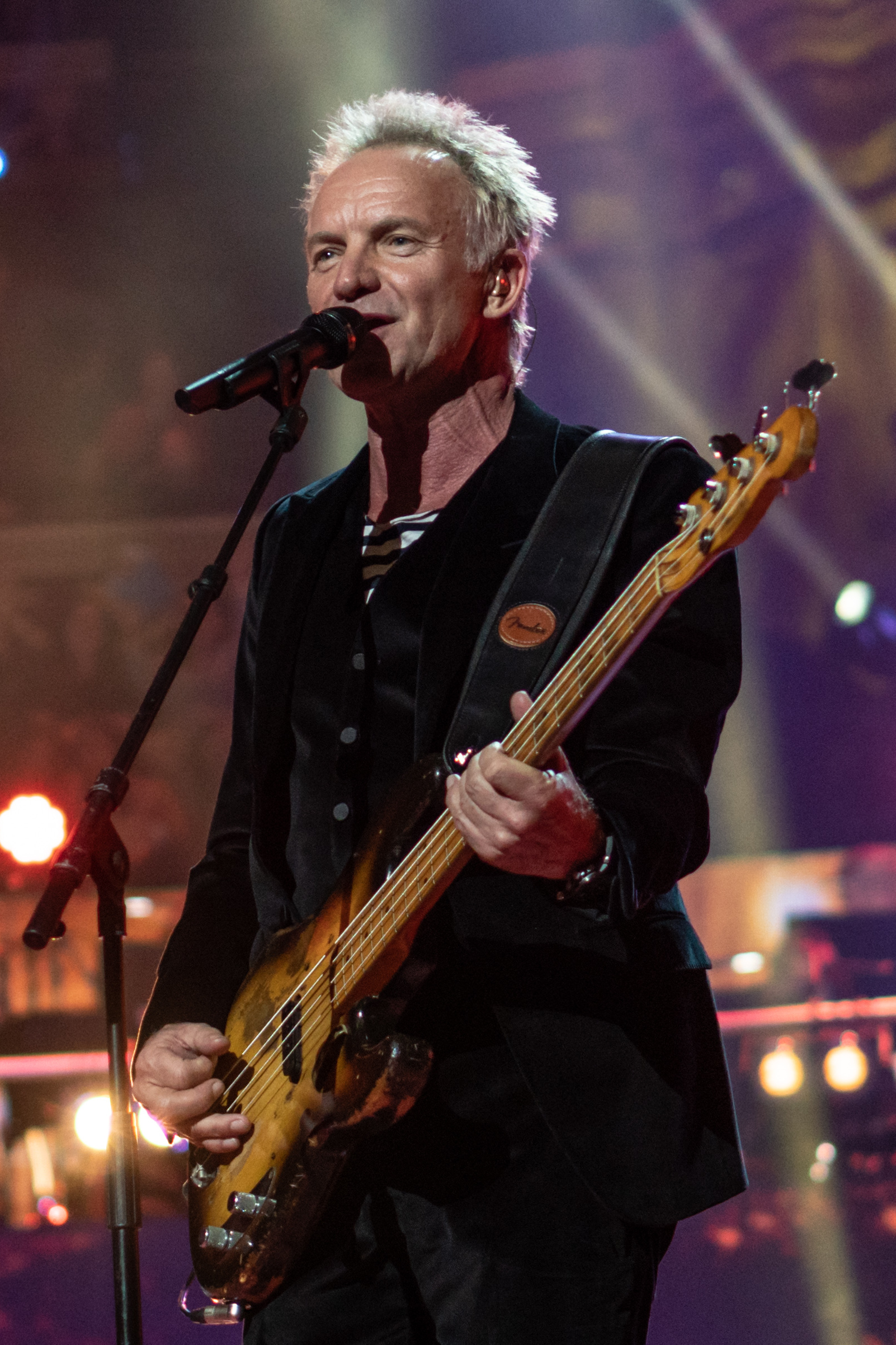
Sting

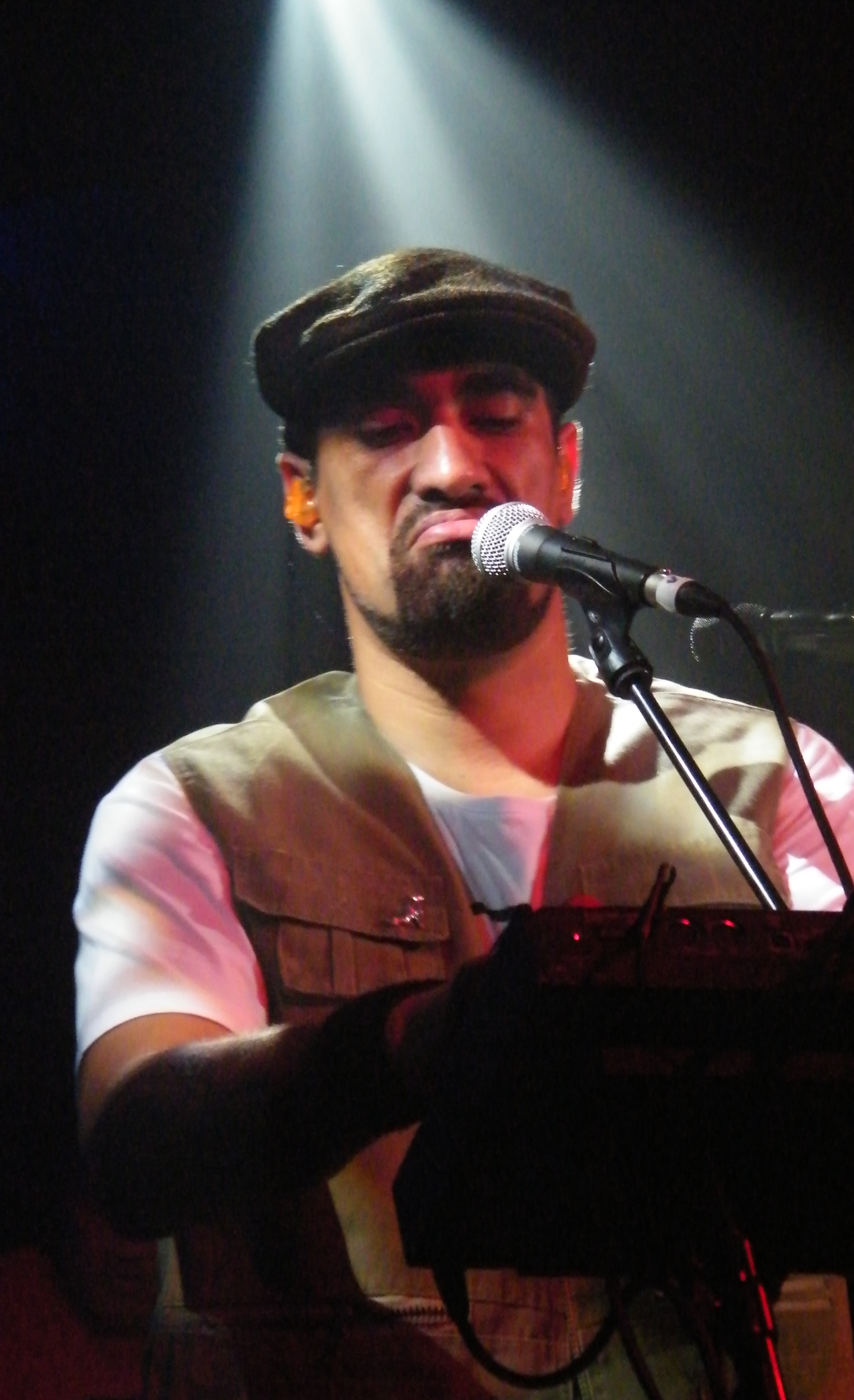
Dallas Tamaira

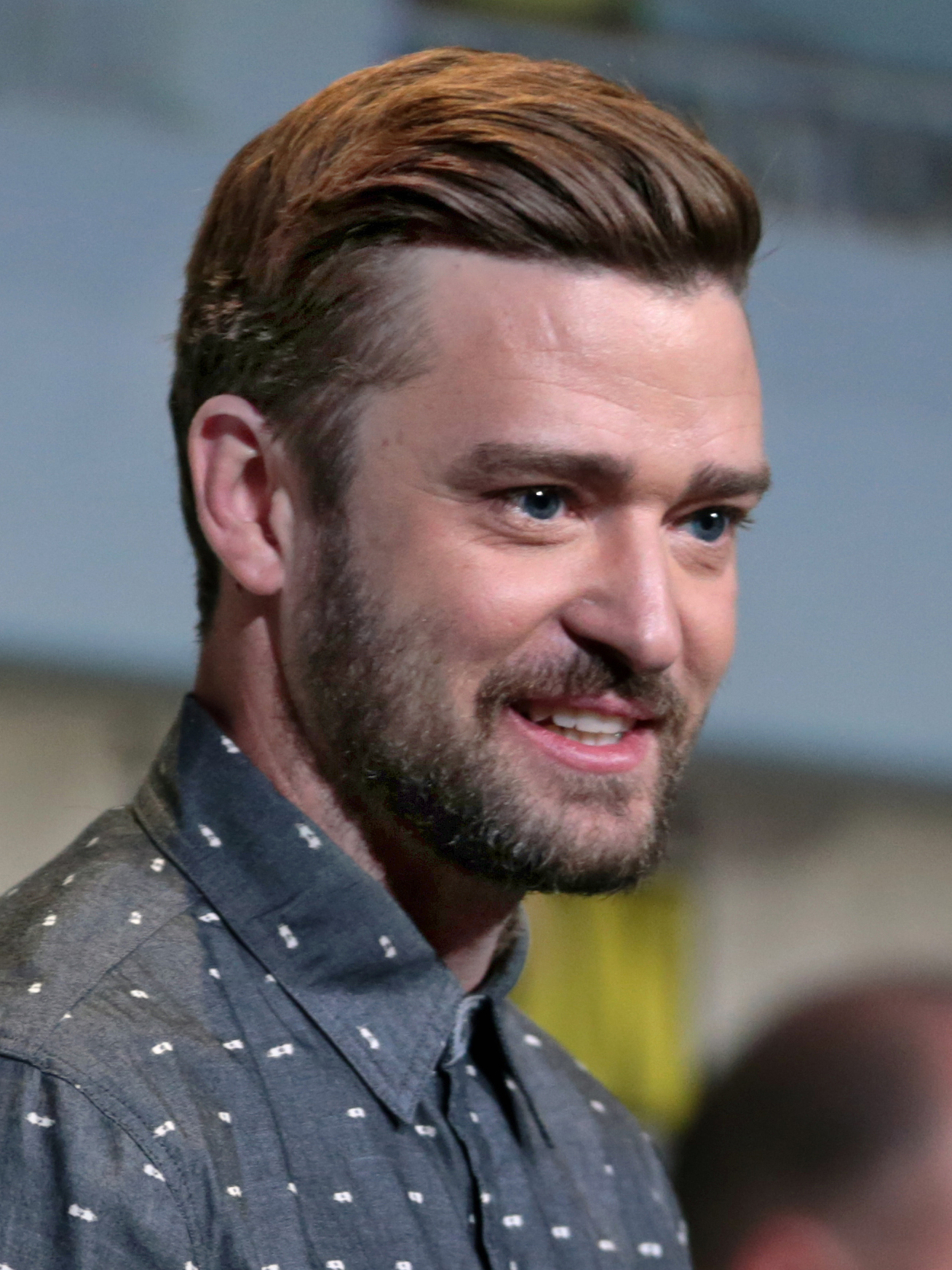
Justin Timberlake

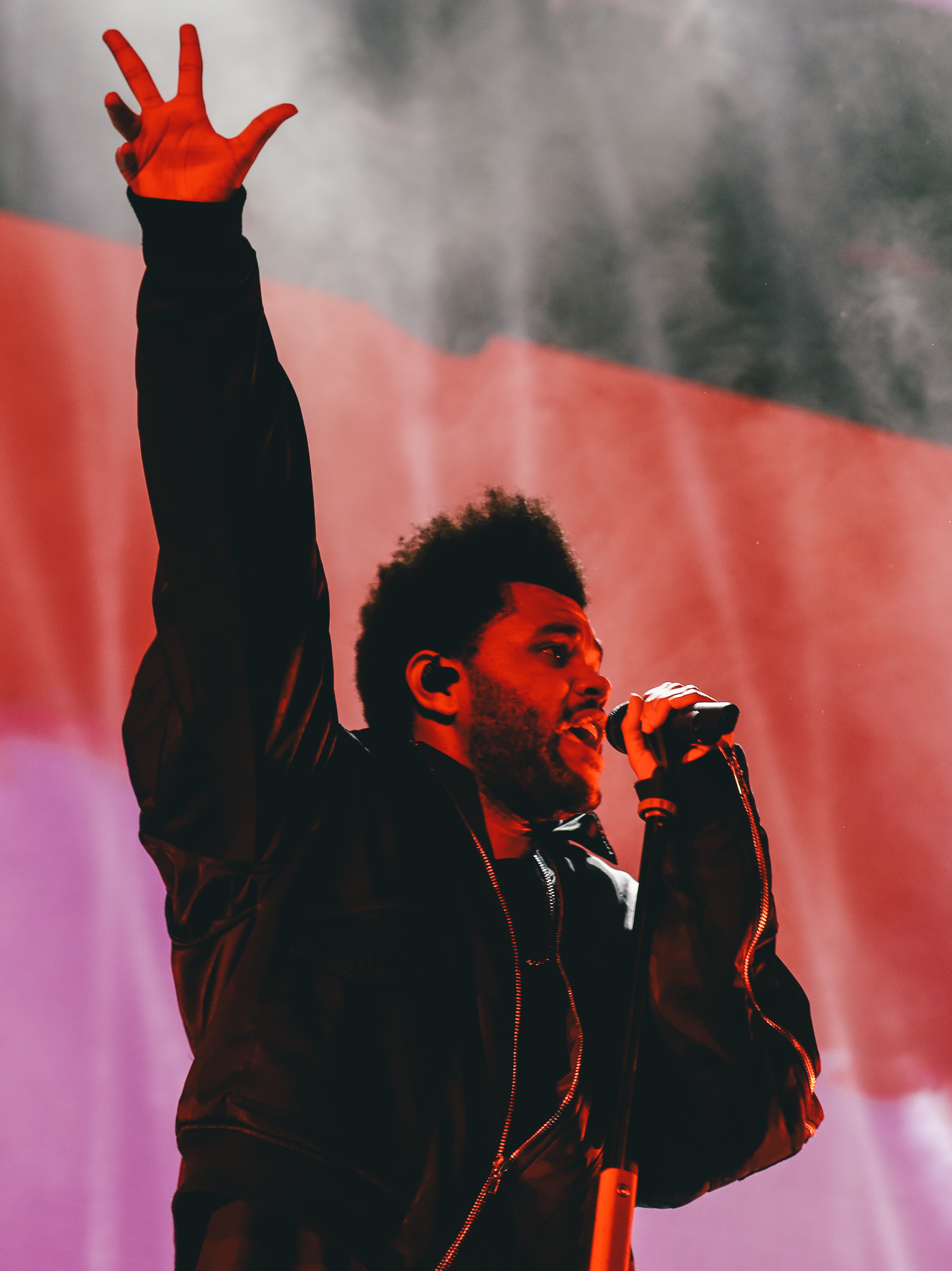
The Weeknd

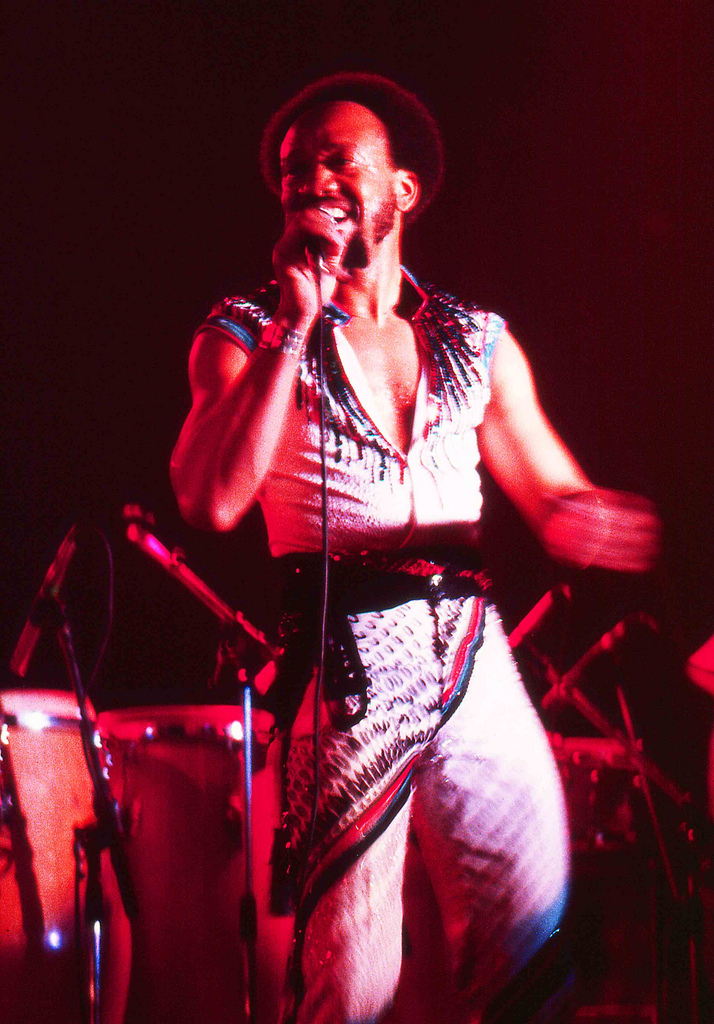
Maurice White

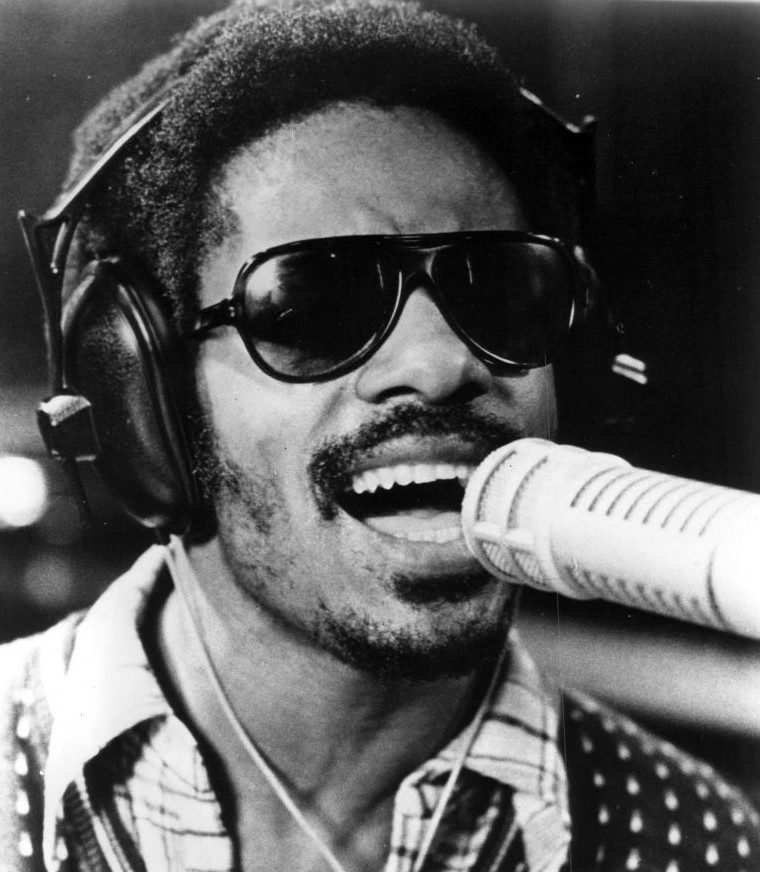
Stevie Wonder

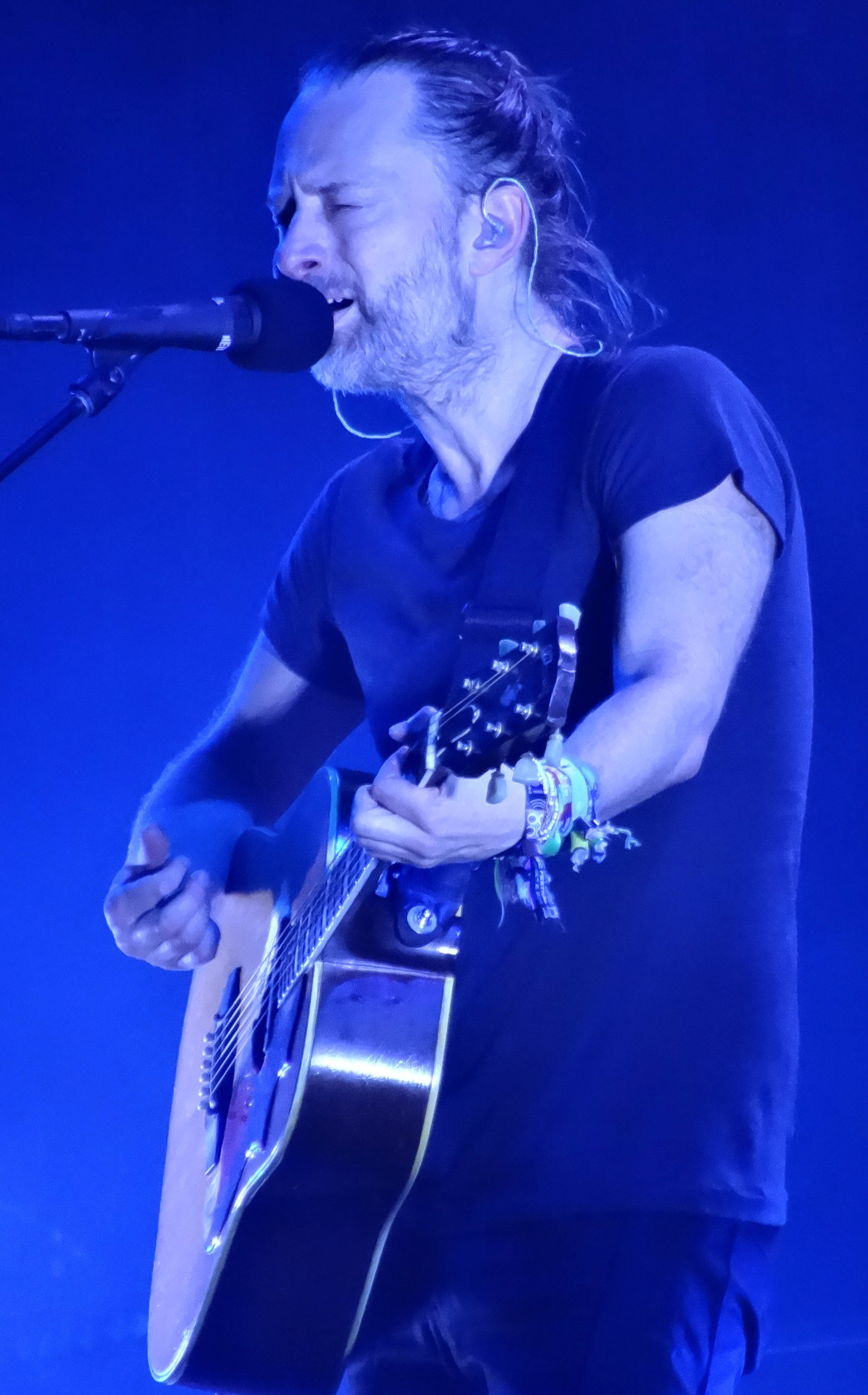
Thom Yorke

Name	Lifespan	Nationality	Associated act(s)	Ref.
Bryan Adams	1959–	Canadian		
Ryan Adams	1974–	American	Whiskeytown; Ryan Adams & the Cardinals; Ryan Adams & the Shining; The Finger; Pornography	
Jim Adkins	1975–	American	Jimmy Eat World; Go Big Casino	
Clay Aiken	1978–	American		
Akon	1973–	American		
Olly Alexander	1990–	English	Years & Years	
Rance Allen	1948–2020	American	The Rance Allen Group	
Marc Almond	1957–	English	Soft Cell; Marc and the Mambas; Flesh Volcano; The Immaculate Consumptive	
Jon Anderson	1944–	English	Yes	
Horace Andy	1951–	Jamaican		
Ted Ansani		American	Material Issue	
Marc Anthony	1968–	American		
John Arch	1959–	American	Fates Warning; Arch/Matheos	
David Archuleta	1990–	American		
Billie Joe Armstrong	1972–	American	Green Day; Pinhead Gunpowder; Foxboro Hot Tubs	
Carmine Appice	1946–	American	Vanilla Fudge; Cactus; Beck, Bogert & Appice; King Kobra; Blue Murder	
Fred Astaire	1899–1987	American		
Dan Auerbach	1979–	American	The Black Keys	
Milo Aukerman	1963–	American	Descendents	
Babyface	1959–	American		
Philip Bailey	1951–	American	Earth, Wind and Fire	
Marty Balin	1942–2018	American	Jefferson Airplane	
J Balvin	1985–	Colombian		
William Bell	1939–	American		
Joey Belladonna	1960–	American	Anthrax	
Matt Bellamy	1978–	English	Muse	
Jon Bellion	1990–	American		
Eric Benét	1966–	American		
George Benson	1943–	American		
Tony Bennett	1926–2023	American		
Chester Bennington	1976–2017	American	Linkin Park; Dead by Sunrise	
Dave Bickler	1953–	American	Survivor	
Justin Bieber (Note: Bieber is also referred to as a countertenor and a baritone)	1994–	Canadian		
Andrew Bird	1973–	American	Andrew Bird's Bowl of Fire; Squirrel Nut Zippers	
David Bisbal	1979–	Spanish		
Cedric Bixler-Zavala	1974–	American	The Mars Volta; At The Drive-In	
Blackbear	1990–	American		
Bizzy Bone	1976–	American	Bone Thugs-n-Harmony	
Wade Bowen	1977–	American		
James Blunt	1974–	English		
Michael Bolton	1953–	American	Blackjack	
Jon Bon Jovi	1962–	American	Bon Jovi	
Joe Bonamassa	1977–	American	Black Country Communion; Rock Candy Funk Party	
Bono (Note: Bono is also referred to as a baritone)	1960–	Irish	U2	
Joe Bonsall	1948–2024	American	The Oak Ridge Boys	
Benson Boone	2002–	American		
Christian Borle	1973–	American		
Pierre Bouvier	1979–	Canadian	Simple Plan; Reset; Artists Against Bullying	
Nino Bravo	1944–1973	Spanish		
Ben Bridwell	1978–	American	Band of Horses; Carissa's Wierd	
Bobby Brown	1969–	American	New Edition	
Chris Brown	1989–	American		
Dennis Brown	1957–1999	Jamaican		
Zac Brown	1978–	American	Zac Brown Band	
Jack Bruce	1943–2014	Scottish	Cream	
Aaron Bruno	1978–	American	Awolnation; Under the Influence of Giants; Home Town Hero	
Peabo Bryson	1951–2026	American		
Lindsey Buckingham	1949–	American	Fleetwood Mac	
Jeff Buckley	1966–1997	American	Gods and Monsters	
Urs Bühler	1971–	Swiss	Il Divo	
Solomon Burke	1936 or 1940–2010	American		
Bo Burnham	1990–	American		
Henry Burr	1882 or 1885–1941	Canadian	Peerless Quartet	
Johnny Bush	1935–2020	American		
Amick Byram	1955–	American		
David Byrne	1952–	Scottish-American	Talking Heads	
Baek-hyun Byun	1992–	South Korean	Exo; Exo-CBX; SuperM	
Ali Campbell	1959–	English	UB40	
Glen Campbell	1936–2017	American	The Wrecking Crew	
Tevin Campbell	1976– or 1978–	American		
Chris Carrabba	1975–	American	Dashboard Confessional; Twin Forks; Further Seems Forever	
Johnny Carter	1934–2009	American	The Flamingos; The Dells	
Nick Carter	1980–	American	Backstreet Boys	
Deen Castronovo	1964–	American	Journey; Bad English; Hardline; Revolution Saints; The Dead Daisies	
Peter Cetera	1944–	American	Chicago	
Changmin	1988–	South Korean	TVXQ; SM the Ballad	
Tom Chaplin	1979–	English	Keane	
Chen	1992–	South Korean	Exo; Exo-CBX; SM the Ballad	
Tyler Childers	1991–	American		
Jimmy Cliff	1944–2025	Jamaican		
Bruce Cockburn	1945–	Canadian		
Marc Cohn	1959–	American		
Phil Collins	1951–	English	Genesis; Flaming Youth	
Javier Colon	1978–	American	The Derek Trucks Band	
Sean Connery	1930–2020	Scottish		
Clay Cook	1978–	American	Zac Brown Band	
Sam Cooke	1931–1964	American	The Soul Stirrers; The Highway Q.C.'s	
Billy Corgan	1967–	American	The Smashing Pumpkins; Zwan; Starchildren	
Michael Crawford	1942–	English		
Jim Croce	1943–1973	American		
Kevin Cronin	1951–	American	REO Speedwagon	
Christopher Cross	1951–	American		
Alan Cumming	1965–	Scottish		
Rivers Cuomo	1970–	American	Weezer; Scott & Rivers; Homie	
D.O.	1993–	South Korean	Exo	
Angelo D'Aleo	1940–	American	Dion and the Belmonts	
Roger Daltrey	1944–	English	The Who; The RD Crusaders; No Plan B	
Britt Daniel	1971–	American	Spoon; Divine Fits	
Chris Daughtry (Note: Some sources also refer to Daughtry as a baritone)	1979–	American	Daughtry	
Jonathan Davis	1971–	American	Korn	
Gavin DeGraw	1977–	American		
Tom DeLonge	1975–	American	blink-182; Angels & Airwaves; Box Car Racer	
John Denver	1943–1997	American	The John Denver Band	
Jason Derulo	1989–	American		
Dennis DeYoung	1947–	American	Styx	
Bruce Dickinson	1958–	English	Iron Maiden; Samson	
Taye Diggs	1971–	American		
Dion DiMucci	1938– or 1939–	American	Dion and the Belmonts	
Ronnie James Dio	1942–2010	American	Elf; Rainbow; Black Sabbath; Dio; Heaven & Hell	
Joe Dolan	1939–2007	Irish		
Doyoung	1996–	South Korean	NCT 127	
Ed Droste	1978–	American	Grizzly Bear	
Thomas Dybdahl	1979–	Norwegian		
Dennis Edwards	1943–2018	American	The Temptations	
Taron Egerton	1989–	Welsh		
Eminem	1972–	American	D12; Bad Meets Evil	
Phil Everly	1939–2014	American	The Everly Brothers	
Brent Faiyaz	1995–	American		
Sam Fender	1994–	English		
Vicente Fernández	1940–2021	Mexican		
Neil Finn	1958–	New Zealander	Crowded House; Split Enz; Fleetwood Mac	
Michael Fitzpatrick	1970–	American	Fitz and the Tantrums	
Brandon Flowers	1981–	American	The Killers	
Dan Fogelberg	1951–2007	American		
Ben Folds	1966–	American	Ben Folds Five; The Bens; 8in8; Majosha; Fear of Pop	
Caleb Followill	1982–	American	Kings of Leon	
Santino Fontana (Note: Fontana is also referred to as a baritone)	1982–	American		
Lukas Forchhammer	1988–	Danish	Lukas Graham	
Tobias Forge	1981–	Swedish	Ghost	
Michael Fracasso		American		
Dennis "Fergie" Frederiksen	1951–2014	American	Angel; LeRoux; Toto	
Martin Fry	1958–	English	ABC; Vice Versa	
Vic Fuentes	1983–	American	Pierce The Veil; Isles & Glaciers	
Jack Fulton	1903–1993	American		
Peter Gabriel	1950–	British	Genesis	
Josh Gad	1981–	American		
Noel Gallagher	1967–	English	Oasis; Noel Gallagher's High Flying Birds	
Childish Gambino	1983–	American		
Art Garfunkel	1941–	American	Simon & Garfunkel	
Alex Gaskarth	1987–	English-American	All Time Low; Simple Creatures	
Bob Gaudio	1942–	American	The Four Seasons; The Royal Teens	
Marvin Gaye	1939–1984	American		
G-Dragon	1988–	South Korean	Big Bang; GD & TOP; GD X Taeyang	
Boy George	1961–	English	Culture Club	
Ben Gibbard	1976–	American	Death Cab for Cutie; The Postal Service	
Robin Gibb	1949–2012	English	Bee Gees	
Roland Gift	1961–	British	Fine Young Cannibals; Akrylykz	
Vince Gill	1957–	American	Eagles; Pure Prairie League; The Time Jumpers; The Notorious Cherry Bombs	
Ian Gillan	1945–	English	Deep Purple; Ian Gillan Band; Gillan; Black Sabbath	
Tyler Glenn	1983–	American	Neon Trees	
Corey Glover	1964–	American	Living Colour	
Zach Goode	1970–	American	Smash Mouth	
Martin Gore	1961–	English	Depeche Mode	
John Gourley	1981–	American	Portugal. The Man; Anatomy of a Ghost	
Lou Gramm	1950–	American	Foreigner	
Mitch Grassi (Note: Some sources also refer to Grassi as a countertenor)	1992–	American	Pentatonix; Superfruit	
Conan Gray	1998–	American		
Al Green (Note: Some sources also refer to Al Green as a baritone and a falsetto)	1946–	American		
Cee Lo Green	1974– or 1975–	American	Gnarls Barkley; Goodie Mob	
Dallas Green	1980–	Canadian	Alexisonfire; You+Me; City and Colour	
Steve Green	1956–	American	Gaither Vocal Band; White Heart	
Jonathan Groff	1985–	American		
Dave Grohl	1969–	American	Nirvana; Foo Fighters; Them Crooked Vultures; Queens of the Stone Age	
Kelly Groucutt	1945–2009	English	Electric Light Orchestra	
Ernie Haase	1964–	American	Cathedral Quartet; Ernie Haase & Signature Sound; The Old Friends Quartet	
Joel "JoJo" Hailey	1971–	American	K-Ci & JoJo; Jodeci	
Rob Halford	1951–	English	Judas Priest; Fight; Halford; 2wo	
Daryl Hall (Note: Hall is also referred to as a baritone)	1946–	American	Hall & Oates	
Evan Stephens Hall	1989–	American	Pinegrove	
Byron G. Harlan	1861–1936	American	Collins & Harlan	
Larnelle Harris	1947–	American	Gaither Vocal Band	
George Harrison	1943–2001	English	The Beatles; Traveling Wilburys	
William "Poogie" Hart	1945–2022	American	The Delfonics	
Bobby Hatfield	1940–2003	American	The Righteous Brothers	
Donny Hathaway	1945–1979	American		
Davey Havok	1975–	American	AFI; Blaqk Audio; Dreamcar; XTRMST; Son of Sam	
Colin Hay	1953–	Scottish-Australian	Men at Work	
Darren Hayes	1972–	Australian	Savage Garden	
Fran Healy	1973–	Scottish	Travis; BNQT	
Matty Healy	1989–	English	The 1975	
Luke Hemmings	1996–	Australian	5 Seconds of Summer	
Don Henley	1947–	American	Eagles	
Noddy Holder	1946–	English	Slade	
Dexter Holland	1965–	American	The Offspring	
Mark Hollis	1955–2019	English	Talk Talk	
Sterling Holloway	1905–1992	American		
Buddy Holly	1936–1959	American	The Crickets	
Niall Horan	1993–	Irish	One Direction	
Jacques Houdek	1981–	Croatian		
Billy Howerdel	1970–	American	A Perfect Circle; Ashes Divide	
Andy Hull	1986–	American	Manchester Orchestra; Bad Books; Right Away, Great Captain!	
I.N	2001–	South Korean	Stray Kids	
Tae-kyung Im	1973–	South Korean		
Fabien Incardona	1985–	French		
Chris Isaak	1956–	American		
Jason Isbell	1979–	American	Drive-By Truckers	
Ronald Isley	1941–	American	The Isley Brothers	
Iyaz	1987–	British Virgin Islander		
Sébastien Izambard	1973–	French	Il Divo	
Michael Jackson (Note: Some sources also refer to Jackson as a bass, baritone, and countertenor)	1958–2009	American	Jackson 5	
Michael Jagmin	1985–	American	A Skylit Drive	
Joshua James		American		
Jimi Jamison	1951–2014	American	Survivor; Cobra; Target	
Al Jarreau	1940–2017	American		
Jimin (Note: Jimin is also referred to as a countertenor)	1995–	South Korean	BTS	
Jin	1992–	South Korean	BTS	
Jo Kwon	1989–	South Korean	2AM; One Day	
Billy Joel	1949–	American	Billy Joel Band; The Hassles; Attila	
Elton John	1947–	English	Bluesology	
Roydel Johnson	1943–	Jamaican	The Congos	
Joe Jonas	1989–	American	Jonas Brothers; DNCE	
Nick Jonas	1992–	American	Jonas Brothers; Nick Jonas & the Administration	
Jonghyun	1990–2017	South Korean	Shinee	
Jónsi	1975–	Icelandic	Sigur Rós	
Jeremy Jordan	1984–	American		
Tyler Joseph	1988–	American	Twenty One Pilots	
Vance Joy	1987–	Australian		
Juanes	1972–	Colombian	Ekhymosis	
Jungkook	1997–	South Korean	BTS	
Noah Kahan	1997-	American		
Lokua Kanza	1958–	Congolese		
Ini Kamoze	1957–	Jamaican		
Theo Katzman	1986-	American	Vulfpeck	
Jay Kay	1969–	English	Jamiroquai	
Charles Kelley	1981–	American	Lady A	
Joe Keery	1992–	American		
Gene Kelly	1912–1996	American		
R. Kelly	1967–	American	Public Announcement	
Eddie Kendricks	1939–1992 or 1940–1992	American	The Temptations	
Myles Kennedy	1969–	American	Alter Bridge; Myles Kennedy & the Conspirators; Cosmic Dust; Citizen Swing; The Mayfield Four	
Nusrat Fateh Ali Khan	1948–1997	Pakistani		
Rahat Fateh Ali Khan	1974–	Pakistani		
Roy Khan (Note: Khan is also referred to as a baritone)	1970–	Norwegian	Conception; Kamelot	
Kihyun	1993–	South Korean	Monsta X	
Jae-hwan Kim	1996–	South Korean	Wanna One	
Jong-kook Kim	1976–	South Korean	Turbo; Running Man Brothers	
Tae-woo Kim	1981–	South Korean	g.o.d	
Bobby Kimball	1947–	American	Toto	
Ash King	1980–	Indian		
Sean Kingston	1990–	Jamaican-American		
Michael Kiske	1968–	German	Helloween; Unisonic; Avantasia; Place Vendome; Kiske/Somerville	
Josh Kiszka	1996–	American	Greta Van Fleet	
Josh Klinghoffer	1979–	American	Red Hot Chili Peppers	
Ed Kowalczyk	1971–	American	Live	
Dimash Kudaibergen (Note: Some sources also refer to Kudaibergen as a countertenor)	1994–	Kazakh		
Kyuhyun	1988–	South Korean	Super Junior; Super Junior-K.R.Y.; Super Junior-M; SM the Ballad	
James LaBrie	1963–	Canadian	Dream Theater	
Jesse Lacey	1978–	American	Brand New; Taking Back Sunday	
Nick Lachey	1973–	American	98 Degrees	
Greg Lake	1947–2016	English	Emerson, Lake & Palmer; King Crimson	
Kendrick Lamar	1987–	American		
Adam Lambert	1982–	American	Queen + Adam Lambert	
Jim Lauderdale	1957–	American		
Aaron Lazar	1976–	American		
Adam Lazzara	1981–	American	Taking Back Sunday	
Simon Le Bon	1958–	British	Duran Duran; Arcadia	
Amos Lee	1977–	American		
Geddy Lee	1953–	Canadian	Rush	
Swae Lee	1995–	American	Rae Sremmurd	
Shulem Lemmer	1989–	American		
John Lennon (Note: Lennon is also referred to as a baritone)	1940–1980	English	The Beatles; Plastic Ono Band	
Sean Lennon	1975–	British-American	Plastic Ono Band; Cibo Matto; The Ghost of a Saber Tooth Tiger; The Claypool Lennon Delirium	
Noah "Panda Bear" Lennox	1978–	American	Animal Collective; Jane	
Sondre Lerche	1982–	Norwegian		
Adam Levine	1979–	American	Maroon 5	
Gary LeVox	1970–	American	Rascal Flatts	
Lil Skies	1998–	American		
Fabio Lione	1973–	Italian	Rhapsody of Fire; Vision Divine; Angra; Labyrinth	
Aaron "Son Little" Livingston		American	Icebird	
Brian Littrell	1975–	American	Backstreet Boys	
Meat Loaf	1947–2022	American	Neverland Express	
Kenny Loggins	1948–	American	Loggins and Messina; Blue Sky Riders	
Lyle Lovett (Note: Some sources also refer to Lovett as a baritone)	1957–	American		
Jeff Lynne	1947–	English	Electric Light Orchestra	
Billy Mackenzie	1957–1997	Scottish	The Associates	
Daron Malakian	1975–	American	System of a Down; Scars on Broadway	
Zayn Malik	1993–	English	One Direction	
Raul Malo (Note: Malo is also referred to as a baritone)	1965–	American	The Mavericks	
Maluma	1994–	Colombian		
Mitch Margo	1947–2017	American	The Tokens	
Mario	1986–	American		
Bob Marley	1945–1981	Jamaican	Bob Marley and the Wailers	
Bruno Mars	1985–	American	The Smeezingtons	
Ricky Martin	1971–	Puerto Rican	Menudo	
Johnny Mathis	1935–	American		
Kristian Matsson	1983–	Swedish	Montezumas	
Maxwell	1973–	American		
Conor Maynard	1992–	British		
Michael Mayo (Note: Some sources also refer to Mayo as a baritone)	1992–	American		
Paul McCartney	1942–	English	The Beatles; Wings; The Fireman	
Bert McCracken	1982–	American	The Used	
Brian McFadden	1980–	Irish	Westlife	
Ewan McGregor	1971–	Scottish		
Tim McIlrath	1978–	American	Rise Against; Baxter; Arma Angelus; The Killing Tree; The Honor System; Yellow Priest Road	
Joey McIntyre	1972–	American	New Kids on the Block; NKOTBSB	
Jeremy McKinnon	1985–	American	A Day to Remember	
Brian McKnight	1969– or 1970–	American		
Klaus Meine	1948–	German	Scorpions	
Colin Meloy	1974–	American	The Decemberists	
Shawn Mendes	1998–	Canadian		
James Mercer	1970–	American	The Shins; Broken Bells	
Freddie Mercury (Note: Some sources also refer to Mercury as a baritone)	1946–1991	British	Queen	
George Michael	1963–2016	English	Wham!	
Raul Midón	1966–	American		
Miguel	1985–	American		
Mika	1983–	Lebanese-English		
Fred Milano	1939–2012	American	Dion and the Belmonts	
David Miller	1973–	American	Il Divo	
Mac Miller	1992–2018	American		
Steve Miller	1943–	American	Steve Miller Band	
Lin-Manuel Miranda	1980–	American		
Jason Molina	1973–2013	American		
Brian Molko	1972–	Scottish-American	Placebo	
Shay Mooney	1991–	American	Dan + Shay	
Daniel Martin Moore		American		
Sam Moore	1935–2025	American	Sam & Dave	
Patrick Monahan	1969–	American	Train	
Chino Moreno	1973–	American	Deftones; Team Sleep; Crosses; Palms	
Morgxn	1986 or 1987–	American		
Wanya Morris	1973–	American	Boyz II Men	
Matthew Morrison	1978–	American		
Van Morrison	1945–	Northern Irish	Them	
Pablo Moses	1948–	Jamaican		
Conor Murphy	1992/1993–	American	Foxing; Smidley	
Nakhane	1988–	South African		
Bob Nanna	1975–	American	Braid; Hey Mercedes; The City on Film; Lifted Bells; Jack & Ace; Friction; Certain People I Know; The Sky Corvair	
Graham Nash	1942–	British	The Hollies; Crosby, Stills, Nash & Young	
Johnny Nash	1940–2020	American		
Youssou N'Dour	1959–	Senegalese		
Neige	1985–	French	Alcest; Amesoeurs; Peste Noire	
Ne-Yo	1979– or 1982–	American		
Simon Neil	1979–	Scottish	Biffy Clyro	
Vince Neil	1961–	American	Mötley Crüe	
Aaron Neville	1941–	American	The Neville Brothers	
Harry Nilsson	1941–1994	American		
Nikolai Noskov	1956–	Russian	Gorky Park	
Donald Novis	1906–1966	American		
Gary Numan	1958–	English	Tubeway Army	
Conor Oberst	1980–	American	Bright Eyes; Desaparecidos; The Faint; Commander Venus; Park Ave.; Conor Oberst and the Mystic Valley Band; Monsters of Folk; Better Oblivion Community Center	
Ric Ocasek	1944–2019 or 1949–2019	American	The Cars	
Billy Ocean	1950–	Trinidadian-English		
Leslie Odom Jr.	1981–	American		
Daniel O'Donnell	1961–	Irish		
Sean O'Hagan	1959–	Irish	The High Llamas; Stereolab; Microdisney	
Kevin Olusola	1989–	Nigerian-American	Pentatonix	
Roy Orbison	1936–1988	American	Traveling Wilburys	
Benjamin Orr	1947-2000	American	The Cars	
Ozzy Osbourne	1948–2025	English	Black Sabbath	
Craig Owens	1984–	American	Chiodos; Destroy Rebuild Until God Shows; badXchannels; Isles & Glaciers; The Sound of Animals Fighting; Cinematic Sunrise; BEA5T	
Jae Park	1992–	South Korean-American	Day6	
Kevin Parker	1986–	Australian	Tame Impala	
Adam Pascal	1970–	American		
Steven Pasquale	1976–	American		
Alan Paul	1949–	American	The Manhattan Transfer	
Tilian Pearson	1987–	American	Dance Gavin Dance; Tides of Man; Emarosa	
Robin Pecknold	1986–	American	Fleet Foxes	
Joe Pernice	1967–	American	Scud Mountain Boys; Pernice Brothers; The New Mendicants	
Steve Perry	1949–	American	Journey	
Tom Petty	1950–2017	American	Tom Petty and the Heartbreakers	
David Phelps	1969–	American	Gaither Vocal Band	
Phillip Phillips	1990–	American		
Jonathan Pierce	1970–2020	American	Gaither Vocal Band; The Imperials	
Webb Pierce	1921–1991	American		
Justin Pierre	1976–	American	Motion City Soundtrack	
Robert Plant	1948–	English	Led Zeppelin; Band of Joy; The Honeydrippers; Page and Plant	
Ben Platt	1993–	American		
Gerry Polci	1954–	American	The Four Seasons	
Mike Posner	1988–	American	Mansionz	
Michael Prophet	1957–2017	Jamaican		
Gary Puckett	1942–	American	Gary Puckett & The Union Gap	
Eric Pulido		American	Midlake	
Charlie Puth	1991–	American		
Kellin Quinn	1986–	American	Sleeping with Sirens	
Daniel Radcliffe	1989–	English		
Ronnie Radke	1983–	American	Escape the Fate; Falling In Reverse	
Tyler Ramsey		American	Band of Horses	
Andrew Rannells	1978–	American		
Cove Reber	1985–	American	Saosin	
Eugene Record	1940–2005	American	The Chi-Lites	
Trippie Redd	1999–	American		
Eddie Redmayne	1982–	English		
Jason Reeves	1984–	American		
Lou Reid	1954–	American	Doyle Lawson & Quicksilver; The Seldom Scene; Lou Reid and Carolina	
Brandon Rhyder	1973–	American		
Damien Rice	1973–	Irish	Juniper	
Little Richard	1932–2020 or 1935–2020	American		
Lionel Richie	1949–	American	The Commodores	
Geoff Rickly	1979–	American	Thursday; No Devotion; United Nations; Ink & Dagger	
Rikrok	1976–	English-Jamaican		
Tyson Ritter	1984–	American	The All-American Rejects	
Smokey Robinson	1940–	American	The Miracles	
Paul Rodgers	1949–	British-Canadian	Bad Company; Queen + Paul Rodgers	
Randy Rogers		American	Randy Rogers Band	
Daniel Rossen (Note: Rossen is also referred to as a baritone)	1982–	American	Grizzly Bear; Department of Eagles	
Prince Royce	1989–	Dominican-American		
Nate Ruess	1982–	American	fun.; The Format	
Sandeul	1992–	South Korean	B1A4	
Timothy B. Schmit	1947–	American	Eagles; Poco; Coral Reefer Band	
Max Schneider	1992–	American		
Bon Scott	1946–1980	Scottish-Australian	AC/DC; Fraternity; The Valentines; The Spektors	
Curly Seckler	1919–2017	American	Nashville Grass	
Seulong	1987–	South Korean	2AM; One Day	
Del Shannon	1934–1990	American		
Ed Sheeran	1991–	English		
Will Sheff	1976–	American	Shearwater; Okkervil River	
Shownu	1992–	South Korean	Monsta X; Shownu X Hyungwon	
Matt Shultz	1983–	American	Cage the Elephant	
Ethan Slater	1992–	American		
Elliott Smith	1969–2003	American	Heatmiser	
Grant Maloy Smith	1957–	American		
Paul Smith	1979–	English	Maxïmo Park	
Robert Smith	1959–	English	The Cure; Siouxsie and the Banshees; The Glove	
Sam Smith	1992–	English		
Sombr	2005–	American		
Jimmy Somerville	1961–	Scottish	Bronski Beat; The Communards	
Trey Songz	1984–	American		
JD Souther	1945–2024	American	Longbranch Pennywhistle; Souther–Hillman–Furay Band	
Layne Staley	1967–2002	American	Alice in Chains; Mad Season; Class of '99	
Rod Stewart	1945–	British	Faces; The Jeff Beck Group; Shotgun Express; Steampacket	
Sting	1951–	English	The Police; Strontium 90	
Shawn Stockman	1972–	American	Boyz II Men	
Allen Stone	1987–	American		
Patrick Stump	1984–	American	Fall Out Boy	
Moses Sumney	1992–	Ghanaian-American		
Patrick Swayze	1952–2009	American		
Taeyang	1988–	South Korean	Big Bang; GD X Taeyang	
Dallas Tamaira	1993-	Māori	Fat Freddy's Drop; Pacific Underground	
İbrahim Tatlıses	1952–	Turkish		
James Taylor	1948–	American		
Ty Taylor	1969–	American	Vintage Trouble	
Ryan Tedder	1979–	American	OneRepublic	
Russell Thompkins Jr. (Note: Thompkins is also referred to as a baritone and a falsetto)	1951–	American	The Stylistics	
Glenn Tilbrook	1957–	English	Squeeze; Difford & Tilbrook	
Bryson Tiller	1993–	American		
Joshua Tillman	1981–	American	Father John Misty	
Justin Timberlake	1981–	American	NSYNC	
Tiny Tim	1932–1996	American		
Louis Tomlinson	1991–	English	One Direction	
Toshi	1965–	Japanese	X Japan	
Devin Townsend	1972–	Canadian	Strapping Young Lad; The Wildhearts; Bent Sea	
Pete Townshend	1945–	English	The Who	
Kurt Travis	1984–	American	Dance Gavin Dance; Royal Coda; Push Over	
Ralph Tresvant	1968–	American	New Edition	
Jeff Tweedy	1967–	American	Wilco; Loose Fur; Golden Smog; Tweedy	
Steven Tyler	1948–	American	Aerosmith; Chain Reaction; Kings of Chaos	
Keith Urban	1967–	New Zealand-Australian	The Ranch	
Midge Ure	1953–	Scottish	Ultravox; Visage; Band Aid	
Brendon Urie	1987–	American	Panic! at the Disco	
Usher	1978–	American		
Frankie Valli	1934–	American	The Four Seasons	
Vitas (Note: Some sources also refer to Vitas as a countertenor)	1979–	Russian		
Bunny Wailer	1947–2021	Jamaican	Bob Marley and the Wailers	
Rufus Wainwright	1973–	American-Canadian		
Patrick Watson	1979–	Canadian-American	Patrick Watson	
Wayne Watson	1954–	American		
Gerard Way	1977–	American	My Chemical Romance	
The Weeknd	1990–	Canadian		
Deryck Whibley	1980–	Canadian	Sum 41	
Bryan White	1974–	American		
Jack White	1975–	American	The White Stripes; The Dead Weather; The Raconteurs	
Maurice White	1941–2016	American	Earth, Wind and Fire	
Andy Williams	1927–2012	American	The Williams Brothers	
Hank Williams	1923–1953	American		
Alan "Blind Owl" Wilson	1943–1970	American	Canned Heat	
Brian Wilson	1942–2025	American	The Beach Boys; California Music	
Jackie Wilson	1934–1984	American	Billy Ward and his Dominoes	
Patrick Wilson	1973–	American		
Steve Winwood	1948–	English	Spencer Davis Group; Traffic; Blind Faith; Go	
Stevie Wonder	1950–	American		
Woohyun	1991–	South Korean	Infinite; Toheart	
Danny Worsnop	1990–	English	Asking Alexandria; We Are Harlot; Heaven's Basement	
Robert Wyatt	1945–	English	The Wilde Flowers; Matching Mole	
Thom Yorke	1968–	English	Radiohead; Atoms for Peace; The Smile	
Yoseob	1990–	South Korean	Highlight	
Neil Young	1945–	Canadian	Buffalo Springfield; Crazy Horse; Crosby, Stills, Nash & Young	
Robin Zander	1953–	American	Cheap Trick	
Jake Zyrus (Note: Prior to his transition from female to male, Zyrus was known under the mononym Charice and possessed a soprano pre-transition)	1992–	Filipino		

== See also ==
- List of basses in non-classical music
- List of baritones in non-classical music
- List of contraltos in non-classical music
- List of mezzo-sopranos in non-classical music
- List of sopranos in non-classical music
