= Slut (EP) =

EP by Flesh Volcano
- Released: 1987
- Recorded: April 1984 and September 1986
- Genre: Industrial
- Length: 16:44
- Label: Some Bizzare
- Producer: Clint Ruin

Professional ratings
Review scores
Source	Rating
AllMusic	3/5 stars
Pitchfork Media	(7.1/10)

Slut is the first and only EP by Flesh Volcano, released in 1987 by Some Bizzare Records.

== Track listing ==
All songs by Marc Almond / Clint Ruin.

1. "Slut" – 5:31
2. "The Universal Cesspool" – 6:53
3. "Bruise N Chain" – 4:20

== Personnel ==
- Marc Almond: voice
- Clint Ruin: instruments

== Re-issues ==
In 1997, the Slut EP appeared in two different CDs reissued by Some Bizzare. The first, Violent Silence•Flesh Volcano, appended the Marc Almond solo record Violent Silence. However, it was almost immediately recalled and a different release, Flesh Volcano•Slut, took its place, adding additional Almond/Ruin collaborations in place of the Almond solo work. This second version was also released by Thirsty Ear, which was simply titled Slut, in February 1998.

=== Violent Silence•Flesh Volcano (Some Bizzare) ===
Songs 4–8 by Almond

1. "The Universal Cesspool"
2. "Bruise N Chain"
3. "Flesh Volcano (Slut)"
4. "Blood Tide" performer Annie Hogan written by Annie Hogan
5. "Healthy as Hate" performer Annie Hogan vocalist Marc Almond
6. "Things You Love for Me" performer Annie Hogan vocalist Marc Almond
7. "Body Unknown" performer Annie Hogan vocalist Marc Almond
8. "Unborn Stillborn" performer Annie Hogan vocalist Marc Almond

=== Flesh Volcano•Slut (Some Bizzare) and Slut (Thirsty Ear) ===
1. "Slut" – 5:31
2. "The Universal Cesspool" – 6:53
3. "Bruise N Chain" – 4:20
4. "Love Amongst the Ruined" – 6:36
  - Performer: Marc Almond Annie Hogan
  - Producer: Clint Ruin (as J. G. Thirlwell)
5. "Burning Boats" – 5:59
  - Performer: Annie Hogan
  - Vocals: Marc Almond (as Raoul Revere)
  - Producer: Clint Ruin
6. "A Million Manias" – 10:16
  - Performer: Marc and the Mambas
  - Featuring: Clint Ruin (as Karl Satan and the Transvestites from Hell)
7. "Beat Out That Rhythm on a Drum" – 4:58
  - Performer: Marc and the Mambas
  - Drums: Clint Ruin (as Frank Want)

== Charts ==
Chart (1988)	Peak position
UK Indie Chart	12
