= Flesh Volcano =

The Flesh Volcano was a side project of singer Marc Almond and Clint Ruin, also known as Foetus. Its sole release was the Slut EP, which was expanded to album length in a number of reissues. Almond and Ruin were formerly bandmates in the Immaculate Consumptive.

== Reception ==
The 1998 re-release of Slut was described as "pretty much intolerable" by Stephen Thomas Erlewine of AllMusic. Another AllMusic critic, Ned Raggett, called their collaboration "essentially nothing more or less than Foetus at his most industrial and clattering with Almond at his most theatrically pained and howling".

== Discography ==
=== EPs ===
- Slut (1987, Some Bizzare)

=== Reissues ===
- Violent Silence•Flesh Volcano (1997, Some Bizzare)
- Flesh Volcano•Slut (1997, Some Bizzare)
- Slut (1998, Thirsty Ear)
