= The Immaculate Consumptive =

US musical group

The Immaculate Consumptive was a collaborative group featuring four musicians of the no wave scene, that existed for three shows in 1983. Its members were Marc Almond, Nick Cave, Lydia Lunch and Clint Ruin (a.k.a. J. G. Thirlwell).

The group existed for three days, October 30–November 1, in 1983, and toured New York City and Washington, D.C., performing solo pieces and collaborations. According to Cave, the group was Lunch's idea. Lunch and Cave had met on the Birthday Party's first US tour in 1981, while Cave knew Thirlwell from their days in Australia. Almond and Thirlwell had been working together for a year prior to the shows on a project that would eventually become Flesh Volcano. The shows featured songs from each of the four members, joined together by a backing tape recorded by Blixa Bargeld, Barry Adamson, and Mick Harvey of the Bad Seeds, and Annie Hogan from Marc and the Mambas. The shows culminated in a group performance of "Body Unknown", with Almond singing, Cave screaming, Thirlwell drumming, and Lunch playing guitar. The shows were not recorded other than by bootleggers. The performances were hindered by Thirlwell breaking the piano on the first night, and on the second, Cave halted his performance, bored with events, telling the audience "then it goes on like that for another five minutes".
