= Damp =

Damp usually refers to the word moist. It may also refer to:

== Music ==
- Damp (Norwegian band), a Norwegian band
- Damp (album), a 2006 compilation album by experimental/industrial band Foetus

== Science and technology ==
- DAMP Project, a ballistic missiles research program
- DAMP (software bundle), a solution stack of software used to run dynamic websites
- 4-DAMP (1,1-dimethyl-4-diphenylacetoxypiperidinium iodide), a muscarinic acetylcholine receptor antagonist
- Deficits in Attention, Motor control and Perception, a psychiatric concept
- Deoxyadenosine monophosphate, or dAMP, a nucleic acid
- Digital AMPS, or D-AMPS, second-generation mobile phone systems
- Hitachi Disk Array Management Program, a software for managing disk storage array
- Damage-associated molecular pattern, a part of the immune system

== Other uses ==
- Damp (structural), the presence of unwanted moisture in the structure of a building
- Damp (mining), a gaseous product formed in coal mines, pits, etc.
- Damp, Germany, a municipality in Schleswig-Holstein, Germany
- Developmentally Appropriate Musical Practice, a practice in music education

== See also ==
- Damper (disambiguation)
- Damping (disambiguation)
