= Damping (disambiguation) =

Damping is an influence within or upon an oscillatory system that has the effect of reducing or preventing its oscillation.

Damping may also refer to:

- Damping (music)
- Damping torque
- Damping capacitor
- Damping off

Measures of damping:

- Damping factor
- Damping capacity
- Damping matrix

Physical devices:

- Dashpot
- Shock absorber

== See also ==
- Damp (disambiguation)
- Damper (disambiguation)
