= The Venture Bros.: The Music of JG Thirlwell =

Soundtrack album by J. G. Thirlwell
- Released: April 7, 2009
- Recorded: Self Immolation Studios, Brooklyn, NY
- Genre: Experimental big band
- Length: 72:03
- Label: Williams Street
- Producer: J. G. Thirlwell

J. G. Thirlwell chronology
Vein (2007)	The Venture Bros.: The Music of JG Thirlwell (2009)	Limb (2009)

The Venture Bros.: The Music of JG Thirlwell is a soundtrack album by J. G. Thirlwell, released on April 7, 2009 by Williams Street. It comprises music that Thirlwell composed for the animated television series The Venture Bros. The CD features 20 tracks, while the vinyl LP release is 16 tracks and a download link of the complete release including the songs omitted from the LP.

== Track listing ==
All music is composed by J. G. Thirlwell

No.	Title	Length
1.	"Brock Graveside"	0:37
2.	"Tuff"	3:41
3.	"Tenssaots"	1:23
4.	"13 BigMon/Boys as Transformers"	1:11
5.	"Node Wrestling"	4:08
6.	"Thunder-Bro"	1:44
7.	"Damion"	3:22
8.	"Assclamp!"	2:28
9.	"Mississippi Noir"	3:11
10.	"Spag"	2:24
11.	"Bolly"	2:35
12.	"Gawker"	3:39
13.	"Descension"	4:02
14.	"Warped Carousel"	1:53
15.	"Sexy Sultry"	2:31
16.	"In a Spaceage Mood"	1:24
17.	"X1 Krashi/Woozzy"	3:42
18.	"Warped Span"	3:42
19.	"Fumblestealth"	2:24
20.	"No Vacancy (VB Theme)"	0:55

== Personnel ==
Adapted from The Venture Bros.: The Music of JG Thirlwell liner notes.

- J. G. Thirlwell – instruments, musical arrangement, record producer, recording, mixing, photography, design

Musicians

- Steven Bernstein – trumpet (1, 9, 10)
- Paul Bonomo – keyboards (18)
- Jeff Davidson – piano (9), banjo (9), trumpet (16)
- Christian Gibbs – guitar (10)
- Paul Shapiro – flute (2, 5)

Production and additional personnel

- Fred Kevorkian – mastering

== Release history ==
Region	Date	Label	Format	Catalog
United States	2009	Williams Street	CD, LP	384-460-007
