= Shock absorber =

Mechanical component

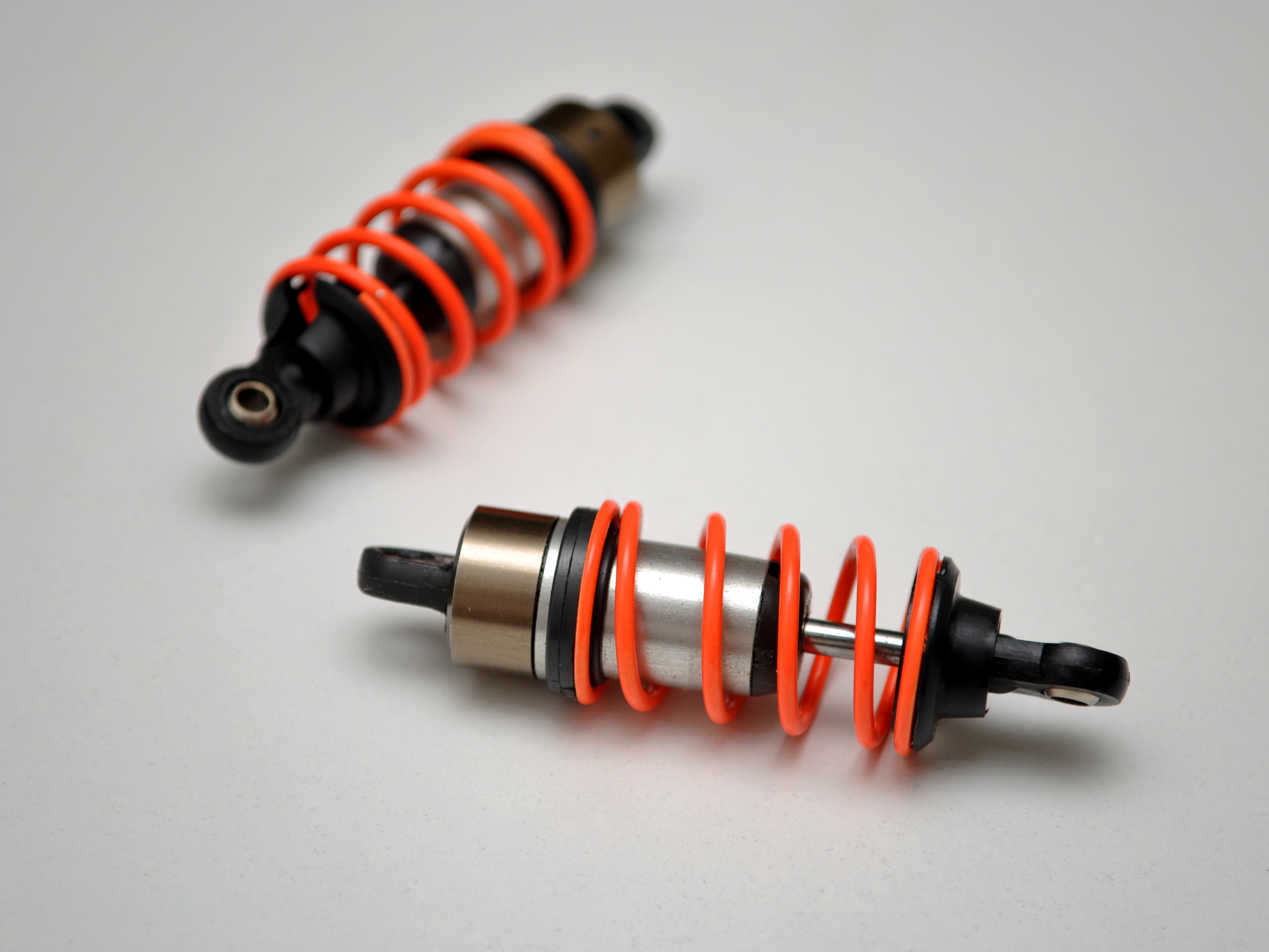
Miniature oil-filled coilover shock components for scale cars

A shock absorber or damper is a mechanical or hydraulic device designed to absorb and damp shock impulses. It does this by converting the kinetic energy of the shock into another form of energy (typically heat) which is then dissipated. Most shock absorbers are a form of dashpot (a damper which resists motion via viscous friction).

== Description ==
Pneumatic and hydraulic shock absorbers are used in conjunction with cushions and springs. An automobile shock absorber contains spring-loaded check valves and orifices to control the flow of oil through an internal piston (see below).

One design consideration, when designing or choosing a shock absorber, is where that energy will go. In most shock absorbers, energy is converted to heat inside the viscous fluid. In hydraulic cylinders, the hydraulic fluid heats up, while in air cylinders, the hot air is usually exhausted to the atmosphere. In other types of shock absorbers, such as electromagnetic types, the dissipated energy can be stored and used later. In general terms, shock absorbers help cushion vehicles on uneven roads and keep wheels in contact with the ground.

=== Vehicle suspension ===
In a vehicle, shock absorbers reduce the effect of traveling over rough ground, leading to improved ride quality and vehicle handling. While shock absorbers serve the purpose of limiting excessive suspension movement, their intended main purpose is to damp spring oscillations. Shock absorbers use valving of oil and gasses to absorb excess energy from the springs. Spring rates are chosen by the manufacturer based on the weight of the vehicle, loaded and unloaded. Some people use shocks to modify spring rates but this is not the correct use. Along with hysteresis in the tire itself, they damp the energy stored in the motion of the unsprung weight up and down. Effective wheel bounce damping may require tuning shocks to an optimal resistance.

Spring-based shock absorbers commonly use coil springs or leaf springs, though torsion bars are used in torsional shocks as well. Ideal springs alone, however, are not shock absorbers, as springs only store and do not dissipate or absorb energy. Vehicles typically employ both hydraulic shock absorbers and springs or torsion bars. In this combination, "shock absorber" refers specifically to the hydraulic piston that absorbs and dissipates vibration. Now, composite suspension systems are used mainly in 2 wheelers and also leaf springs are made up of composite material in 4 wheelers.

=== Construction ===
The most common type is a hydraulic shock absorber which uses a piston with small holes mounted to a shaft, a cylindrical body and an oil-filled chamber and is constructed as a typical dashpot. A more advanced style uses an additional compressed gas section separated from the oil with a free-moving solid piston inside the cylinder or a smaller, separate cylinder in a piggy-back orientation to the main chamber. The gas filled section contains dehydrated nitrogen gas at high pressure (typically 500psi) which acts to compress the oil to prevent frothing from the dissolved/entrained air. Construction requires a balance of features for various applications such as piston design and the oil bypass galleries, hydraulic oil viscosity, cylinder diameter and compression length, gas-charge pressure and chamber size, and various mounting struts or external structural connections. As technology progresses, other types of shock absorbers have emerged: adjustable oil/air, fixed magnetic resistance and tunable eddy-current types.

== Early history ==
In common with carriages and railway locomotives, most early motor vehicles used leaf springs. One of the features of these springs was that the friction between the leaves offered a degree of damping, and in a 1912 review of vehicle suspension, the lack of this characteristic in helical springs was the reason it was "impossible" to use them as main springs. However the amount of damping provided by leaf spring friction was limited and variable according to the conditions of the springs, and whether wet or dry. It also operated in both directions. Motorcycle front suspension adopted coil sprung Druid forks from about 1906, and similar designs later added friction disk shock absorber rotary friction dampers, which damped both ways - but they were adjustable (e.g. 1924 Webb forks). These friction disk shock absorbers were also fitted to many cars.

One of the problems with motor cars was the large variation in sprung weight between lightly loaded and fully loaded, especially for the rear springs. When heavily loaded the springs could bottom out, and apart from fitting rubber "bump stops", there were attempts to use heavy main springs with auxiliary springs to smooth the ride when lightly loaded, which were often called "shock absorbers". Realizing that the spring and vehicle combination bounced with a characteristic frequency, these auxiliary springs were designed with a different period, but were not a solution to the problem that the spring rebound after striking a bump could throw passengers out of their seats. What was called for was damping that operated on the rebound.

Although C.L. Horock came up with a design in 1901 that had hydraulic damping, it worked in one direction only. It does not seem to have gone into production right away, whereas mechanical dampers such as the Gabriel Snubber started being fitted in the late 1900s (also the similar Stromberg Anti-Shox). These used a belt coiled inside a device such that it freely wound in under the action of a coiled spring but met friction when drawn out. Gabriel Snubbers were fitted to an 11.9HP Arrol-Johnston car which broke the 6-hour Class B record at Brooklands in late 1912, and the Automator journal noted that this snubber might have a great future for racing due to its light weight and easy fitment.

French engineers Gaston Dumond and Ernest Mathis patented two different hydraulic shock absorbers with rectilinear motion in 1906–1907, but those were not commercially successful.

One of the earliest hydraulic dampers to go into production was the Telesco Shock Absorber, exhibited at the 1912 Olympia Motor Show and marketed by Polyrhoe Carburettors Ltd. This contained a spring inside the telescopic unit like the pure spring type "shock absorbers" mentioned above, but also oil and an internal valve so that the oil damped in the rebound direction. The Telesco unit was fitted at the rear end of the leaf spring, in place of the rear spring to chassis mount, so that it formed part of the springing system, albeit a hydraulically damped part. This layout was presumably selected as it was easy to apply to existing vehicles, but it meant the hydraulic damping was not applied to the action of the main leaf spring, but only to the action of the auxiliary spring in the unit itself.

The first production hydraulic dampers to act on the main leaf spring movement were probably those based on an original concept by Maurice Houdaille patented in 1908 and 1909. These used a lever arm which moved hydraulically damped vanes inside the unit. The main advantage over the friction disk dampers was that it would resist sudden movement but allow slow movement, whereas the rotary friction dampers tended to stick and then offer the same resistance regardless of speed of movement. There appears to have been little progress on commercialising the lever arm shock absorbers until after World War I, after which they came into widespread use, for example as standard equipment on the 1927 Ford Model A and manufactured by Houde Engineering Corporation of Buffalo, NY.

== Types of vehicle shock absorbers ==
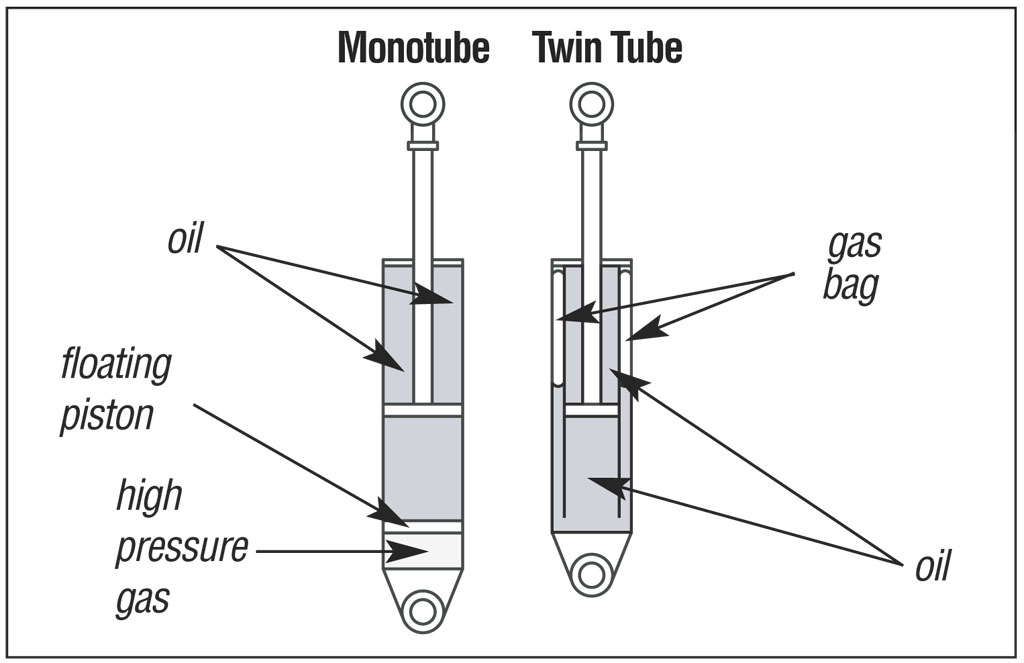
Diagram of the main components of a twin-tube and mono-tube shock absorber

Most vehicular shock absorbers are either twin-tube or mono-tube types with some variations on these themes.

=== Twin-tube ===
==== Basic twin-tube ====
Also known as a "two-tube" shock absorber, this device consists of two nested cylindrical tubes, an inner tube that is called the "working tube" or the "pressure tube", and an outer tube called the "reserve tube". At the bottom of the device on the inside is a compression valve or base valve. When the piston is forced up or down by bumps in the road, hydraulic fluid moves between different chambers via small holes or "orifices" in the piston and via the valve, converting the "shock" energy into heat which must then be dissipated.

==== Twin-tube gas charged ====
Variously known as a "gas cell two-tube" or similarly named design, this variation represented a significant advancement over the basic twin-tube form. Its overall structure is very similar to the twin-tube, but a low-pressure charge of nitrogen gas is added to the reserve tube. The result of this alteration is a dramatic reduction in "foaming" or "aeration", the undesirable outcome of a twin-tube overheating and failing which presents as foaming hydraulic fluid dripping out of the assembly. Twin-tube gas charged shock absorbers represent the vast majority of original modern vehicle suspension installations.

==== Position sensitive damping ====
Often abbreviated simply as "PSD", this design is another evolution of the twin-tube shock. In a PSD shock absorber, which still consists of two nested tubes and still contains nitrogen gas, a set of grooves has been added to the pressure tube. These grooves allow the piston to move relatively freely in the middle range of travel (i.e., the most common street or highway use, called by engineers the "comfort zone") and to move with significantly less freedom in response to shifts to more irregular surfaces when upward and downward movement of the piston starts to occur with greater intensity (i.e., on bumpy sections of roads— the stiffening gives the driver greater control of movement over the vehicle so its range on either side of the comfort zone is called the "control zone"). This advance allowed car designers to make a shock absorber tailored to specific makes and models of vehicles and to take into account a given vehicle's size and weight, its maneuverability, its horsepower, etc. in creating a correspondingly effective shock.

==== Coilover ====
Coilover shock absorbers are usually a kind of twin-tube, gas-charged shock absorber inside the helical road spring. They are common on motorcycles and scooter rear suspensions, and widely used on front and rear suspensions in cars.

=== Mono-tube ===
Hydraulic shock absorber monotube in different operational situations: 1 ) Drive slow or adjustments open 2 ) Like "1", but extension immediately after the compression 3 ) Drive fast adjustments or closed, you can see the bubbles of depression, which can lead to the phenomenon of cavitation 4 ) Like "3", but the extension immediately after the compression Note: The volume change caused by the stem is considered.

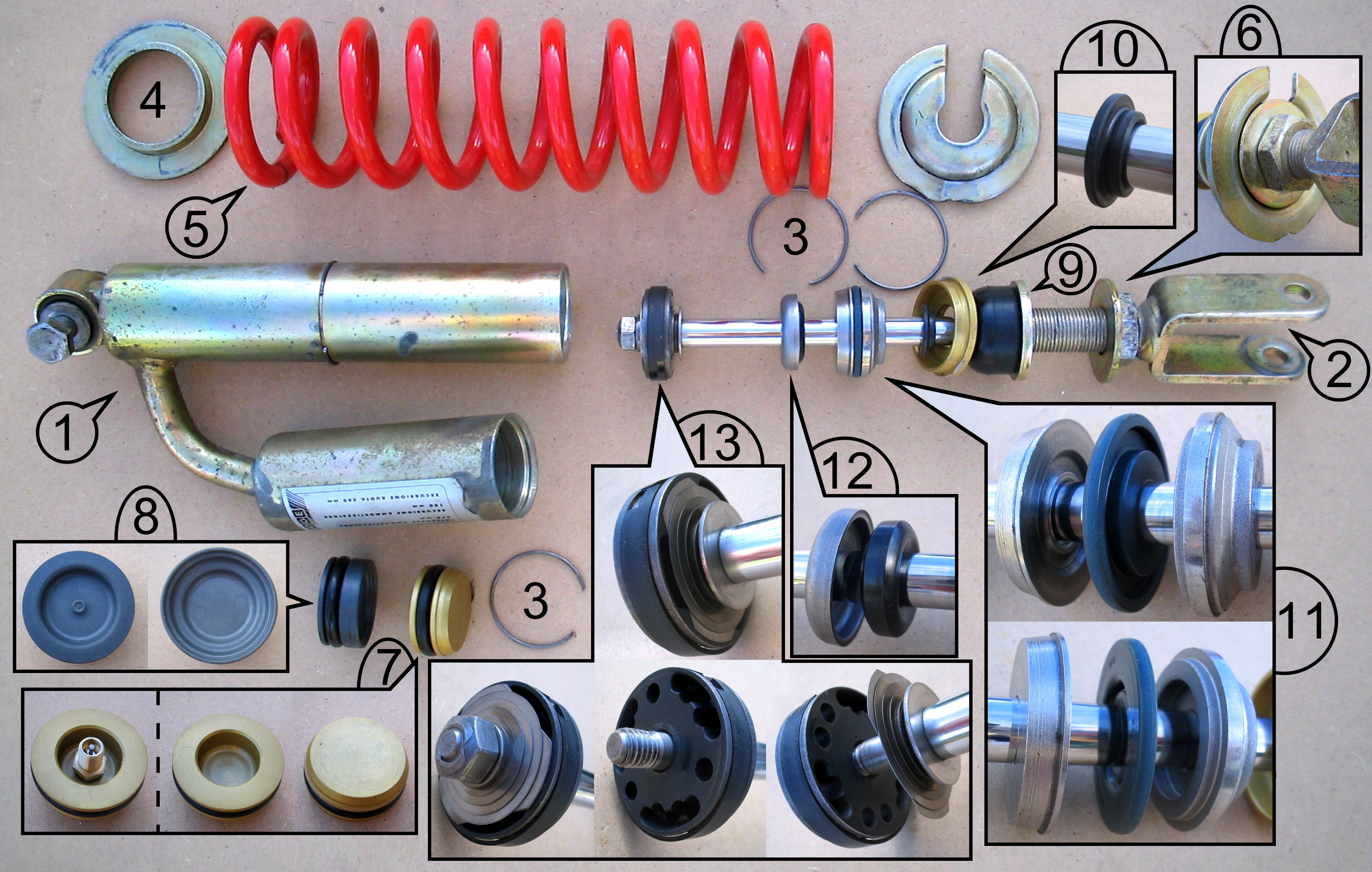
Absorber with remote-reservoir connected rigidly, compared to most shock absorbers. It uses a diaphragm instead of a membrane, and does not contain a control valve for expansion of the pneumatic chamber. Description: 1) Sheath and gas tank 2) Stem 3) Snap rings 4) Plate bearing spring 5) Spring 6) End cap and preload adjustment 7) Cap gas, present in versions both with or without gas valve (inverted profile) 8) Mobile diaphragm 9) Pad switch (compression) 10) Wiper 11) Oil seal assembly, and shock seal 12) Negative buffer pad or limit switch (extension) 13) Piston with sliding blades and seal

The principal design alternative to the twin-tube form has been the mono-tube shock absorber which was considered a revolutionary advancement when it appeared in the 1950s. As its name implies, the mono-tube shock, which is also a gas-pressurized shock and also comes in a coilover format, consists of only one tube, the pressure tube, though it has two pistons. These pistons are called the working piston and the dividing or floating piston, and they move in relative synchrony inside the pressure tube in response to changes in road smoothness. The two pistons also completely separate the shock's fluid and gas components. The mono-tube shock absorber is consistently a much longer overall design than the twin-tubes, making it difficult to mount in passenger cars designed for twin-tube shocks. However, unlike the twin-tubes, the mono-tube shock can be mounted either way—it does not have any directionality. It also does not have a compression valve, whose role has been taken up by the dividing piston, and although it contains nitrogen gas, the gas in a mono-tube shock is under high pressure (260-360 p.s.i. or so) which can actually help it to support some of the vehicle's weight, something which no other shock absorber is designed to do. Due to their larger size, monotube dampers dissipate heat better than dual-tube dampers.

Mercedes became the first auto manufacturer to install mono-tube shocks as standard equipment on some of their cars starting in 1958. They were manufactured by Bilstein, patented the design and first appeared in 1954s. Because the design was patented, no other manufacturer could use it until 1971 when the patent expired.

=== Spool valve ===
Spool valve dampers are characterized by the use of hollow cylindrical sleeves with machined-in oil passages as opposed to traditional conventional flexible discs or shims. Spool valving can be applied with monotube, twin-tube, or position-sensitive packaging, and is compatible with electronic control.

Primary among benefits cited in Multimatic's 2010 patent filing is the elimination of performance ambiguity associated with flexible shims, resulting in mathematically predictable, repeatable, and robust pressure-flow characteristics.

=== Remote reservoir/piggy-back ===
An extra tube or container of oil connected to the oil compartment of the (main) shock via a flexible pipe (remote reservoir) or inflexible pipe (piggy-back shock). Increases the amount of oil a shock can carry without increasing its length or thickness.

=== Bypass shock ===
Allows each section of suspension travel to have an independent suspension tune. Bypass shock, double bypass shock, triple bypass shock etc. Triple bypass would have a separate set of suspension tuning controls for each of its three sections of suspension travel: initial travel, mid-travel, full-travel.

== Theoretical approaches ==
There are several commonly used principles behind shock absorption:

- Hysteresis of structural material, for example the compression of rubber disks, stretching of rubber bands and cords, bending of steel springs, or twisting of torsion bars. Hysteresis is the tendency for otherwise elastic materials to rebound with less force than was required to deform them. Simple vehicles with no separate shock absorbers are damped, to some extent, by the hysteresis of their springs and frames.
- Dry friction as used in wheel brakes, by using disks (classically made of leather) at the pivot of a lever, with friction forced by springs. Used in early automobiles such as the Ford Model T, up through some British cars of the 1940s and on the French Citroën 2CV in the 1950s. Although now considered obsolete, an advantage of this system is its mechanical simplicity; the degree of damping can be easily adjusted by tightening or loosening the screw clamping the disks, and it can be easily rebuilt with simple hand tools. A disadvantage is that the damping force tends not to increase with the speed of the vertical motion.

- Solid state, tapered chain shock absorbers, using one or more tapered, axial alignment(s) of granular spheres, typically made of metals such as nitinol, in a casing. ,
- Fluid friction, for example the flow of fluid through a narrow orifice (hydraulics), constitutes the vast majority of automotive shock absorbers. This design first appeared on Mors racing cars in 1902. One advantage of this type is, by using special internal valving, the absorber may be made relatively soft to compression (allowing a soft response to a bump) and relatively stiff to extension, controlling "rebound", which is the vehicle response to energy stored in the springs; similarly, a series of valves controlled by springs can change the degree of stiffness according to the velocity of the impact or rebound. Specialized shock absorbers for racing purposes may allow the front end of a dragster to rise with minimal resistance under acceleration, then strongly resist letting it settle, thereby maintaining a desirable rearward weight distribution for enhanced traction.

- Compression of a gas, for example pneumatic shock absorbers, which can act like springs as the air pressure is building to resist the force on it. Enclosed gas is compressible, so equipment is less subject to shock damage. This concept was first applied in series production on Citroën cars in 1954. Today, many shock absorbers are pressurized with compressed nitrogen, to reduce the tendency for the oil to cavitate under heavy use. This causes foaming which temporarily reduces the damping ability of the unit. In very heavy duty units used for racing or off-road use, there may even be a secondary cylinder connected to the shock absorber to act as a reservoir for the oil and pressurized gas. In aircraft landing gear, air shock absorbers may be combined with hydraulic damping to reduce bounce. Such struts are called oleo struts (combining oil and air) .
- Inertial resistance to acceleration, the Citroën 2CV had shock absorbers that damp wheel bounce with no external moving parts. These consisted of a spring-mounted 3.5 kg (7.75 lb) iron weight inside a vertical cylinder and are similar to, yet much smaller than versions of the tuned mass dampers used on tall buildings.
- Composite hydropneumatic suspension combines many suspension elements in a single device: spring action, shock absorption, ride-height control, and self leveling suspension. This combines the advantages of gas compressibility and the ability of hydraulic machinery to apply force multiplication.
- Conventional shock absorbers can be combined with air suspension springs - an alternate way to achieve ride-height control, and self leveling suspension.
- In an electrorheological fluid damper, an electric field changes the viscosity of the oil. This principle allows semi-active damper applications in automotive and various industries.
- Magnetic field variation: a magnetorheological damper changes its fluid characteristics through an electromagnet.
- The effect of a shock absorber at high (sound) frequencies is usually limited by using a compressible gas as the working fluid or mounting it with rubber bushings.

== Special features ==
- Some shock absorbers allow tuning of the ride via control of the valve by a manual adjustment provided at the shock absorber.
- Active suspension systems allow the driver to electronically adjust the damper stiffness and automatically change damper stiffness to adapt to road conditions, using mechanisms such as adjustable valves or magnetorheological fluid.
- Additional control can be provided by dynamic valve control via computer in response to sensors, giving both a smooth ride and a firm suspension when needed, allowing ride height adjustment or even ride height control.
- Ride height control is especially desirable in highway vehicles intended for occasional rough road use, as a means of improving handling and reducing aerodynamic drag by lowering the vehicle when operating on improved high speed roads.
- Used for heatsinks, fans, or liquid cooling to prevent or delay shock fade and failure (oil leak) due to overheating
- Used for subwoofers to prevent or delay shock conduct to the floor or shock-sensitive devices

== Shock absorber and strut comparison ==
- A strut is a structural component that combines the shock absorber with other suspension parts like the coil spring and steering knuckle into one compact unit
- Unlike a shock absorber, a strut has a reinforced body and stem.
- Struts are subjected to multidirectional loads, while a shock absorber only damps vibration, only receiving a load along its axis.
- Struts and shock absorbers have a different way of attachment. Shock absorbers are mounted through rubber or urethane bushings to the frame and suspension. A strut is hard mounted to the suspension and is mounted to the frame through a rotating plate providing the upper pivot point of the steering.

== See also ==
- Base isolation
- Betagel, uses gel and silicone to absorb violent shocks
- Buffer (disambiguation)
- Buffer (rail transport)
- Buffer stop
- Chapman strut
- Cushioning
- Damped wave
- Damper (disambiguation)
- Damping ratio
- Dashpot
- Hydropneumatic suspension
- Impact force
- Lever arm shock absorber
- List of auto parts
- MacPherson strut
- Oleo strut
- Packaging and labeling
- Ralph Peo
- Shock (mechanics)
- Shock mount
- Shock response spectrum
- Strut bar
- Strut
- Vibration
- Vibration isolation

== Sources ==
- Shelton, Chris. "Then, Now, and Forever" in Hot Rod, March 2017, pp. 16–29.

== Bibliography ==
- Kinra, Vikram K.; Wolfenden, Alan (1992), M3D: mechanics and mechanisms of material damping, ASTM special technical publication number 1169, Philadelphia, Pennsylvania, USA: ASTM International, ISBN 978-0-8031-1495-1
- Holland, Max (1989), When the Machine Stopped: A Cautionary Tale from Industrial America, Boston: Harvard Business School Press, ISBN 978-0-87584-208-0, OCLC 246343673.
