= Timothy Lane =

British apothecary, inventor and natural philosopher (1734–1807)

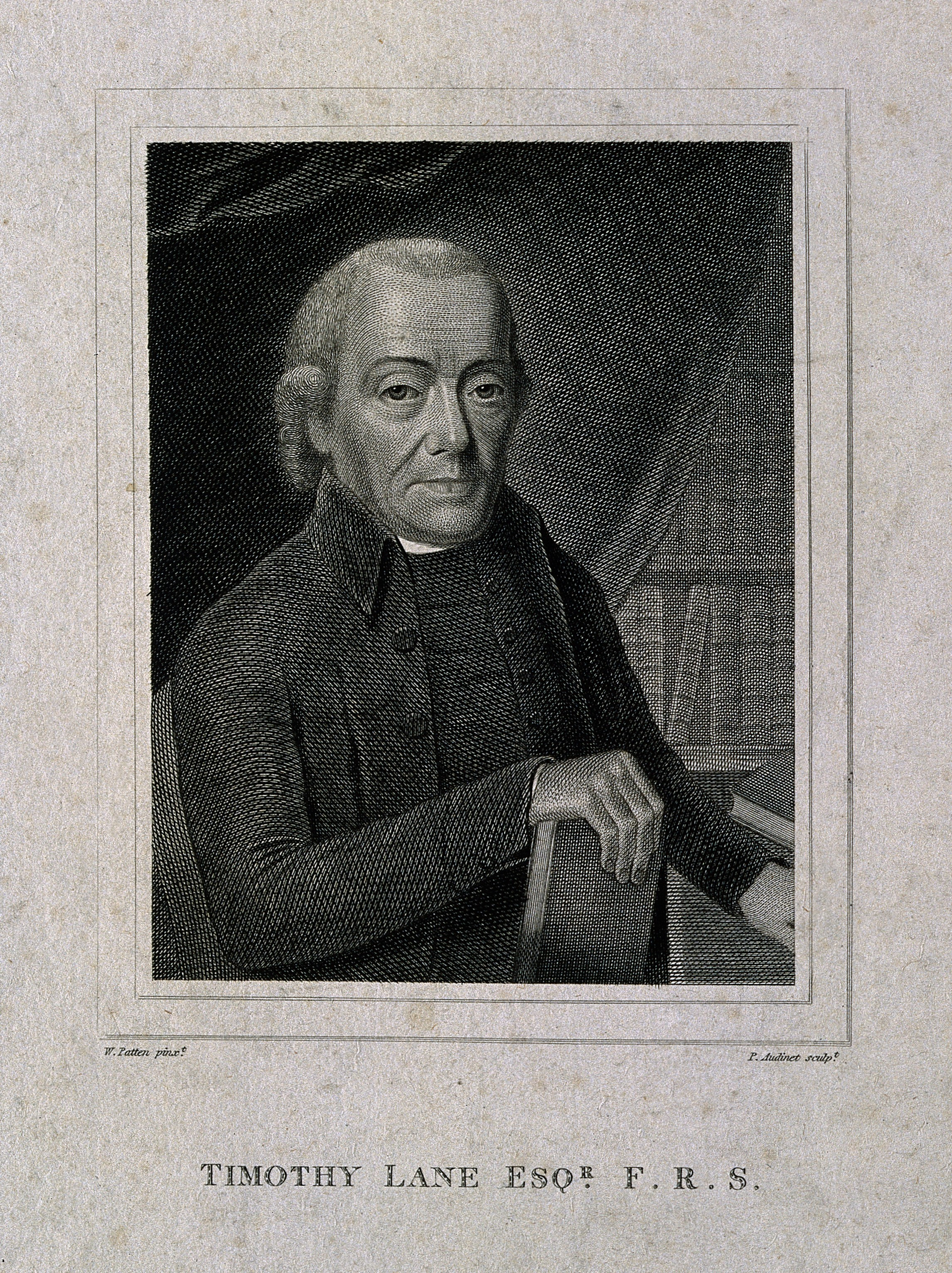
Timothy Lane engraving

Timothy Lane FRS (June 1734–5 July 1807) was a British inventor and scientist.

His father was an apothecary, and Timothy followed in his footsteps, becoming a member of London’s Society of Apothecaries in 1757. His scientific interests were far-reaching; he was as curious about natural philosophy and chemistry as he was about medicine and botany. He was particularly interested in experiments and research on the uses of electricity that were being conducted by colleagues like Joseph Priestley. In the 1760s, Lane invented an instrument that could measure the strength of the electricity discharged from a Leyden jar. Benjamin Franklin used this device—known as "Lane's electrometer"—in his study of atmospheric electricity. In collaboration with his colleague Henry Cavendish, Lane also created a torpedo that could dispense electric shocks. It was on the strength of his research on electricity that he became a fellow of the Royal Society in 1770. This research also led to his 1777 selection for a committee charged with discovering the ideal shape for lightning rods; this committee comprised several other prominent scientists of the day, including high-ranking members of the Royal Society and Edward Nairne. He was elected as a member to the American Philosophical Society in 1772.

In 1801, Lane invented and patented "Measuring glasses for compounding medicines," which were thought to be more reliable and accurate than comparable products on the market. That same year, he became the Master of the Society of Apothecaries. Lane married Ann Halford in 1763 and they had one child, Mary Aubrey Lane. He died at Mary's home in Hampstead in 1807.
