= The Venture Bros. =

American adult animated television series (2003–2018)

- Genre: Adult animation; Action-adventure; Action comedy; Black comedy; Animated sitcom; Comedy drama; Parody/Satire; Science fantasy
- Created by: Jackson Publick; Doc Hammer
- Directed by: Jackson Publick (seasons 1–6); Juno Lee (season 7)
- Voices of: James Urbaniak; Patrick Warburton; Michael Sinterniklaas; Chris McCulloch; Doc Hammer; Steven Rattazzi; Dana Snyder
- Music by: JG Thirlwell
- Country of origin: United States
- Original language: English
- No. of seasons: 7
- No. of episodes: 81 (+1 pilot and 4 specials) (list of episodes)

Production
- Executive producers: Jackson Publick; Doc Hammer (Note: Doc Hammer is credited as executive producer from season 5 onward); Charlie Miller (Note: Credited as executive producer for World Leaders Entertainment from season 2 to season 4.); Chris Prynoski (Note: Credited as executive producers for Titmouse, Inc. for the seasons and specials produced by the studio.); Shannon Prynoski; Keith Crofford (Note: Crofford and Lazzo serve as executive producers for Williams Street from season 5 onward. Prior to this, they are credited as "Executives in Charge of Production for Cartoon Network."); Mike Lazzo
- Producer: Rachel Simon
- Running time: 22–24 minutes
- Production companies: Astro Base GO!; World Leaders Entertainment (Note: Credited as NoodleSoup Productions for the first two seasons.) (2003–10); Titmouse, Inc. (2011–18); Williams Street (Note: Credited as Cartoon Network Productions for the first five seasons, only credited via the logo on seasons 6 and 7.)

Original release
- Network: Adult Swim
- Release: February 16, 2003 – October 7, 2018

The Venture Bros. is an American adult animated action-adventure television series created by Jackson Publick and Doc Hammer for Cartoon Network's late night programming block Adult Swim. Following a pilot episode on February 16, 2003, the series premiered on August 7, 2004. The Venture Bros. is one of Adult Swim's longest-running original series in terms of years, with seven produced seasons over fifteen years of production.

Throughout its run, the series received critical acclaim for its writing, characters, humor, animation and world building. It ended its run on October 7, 2018, with a total of 81 episodes over the course of seven seasons as well as four specials. On September 7, 2020, series creator Jackson Publick announced on Twitter that the series had been canceled. A direct-to-video film that serves as the series finale, Radiant Is the Blood of the Baboon Heart, was released on July 21, 2023, on digital and July 25, 2023, on Blu-ray and premiered on Adult Swim and Max 90 days later.

== Premise ==
The series chronicles the lives and adventures of the Venture family: emotionally insecure, unethical and underachieving super-scientist father Dr. Thaddeus "Rusty" Venture; his well-meaning but dimwitted and incompetent teenage fraternal twin sons Hank and Dean Venture; the family's bodyguard, secret agent Brock Samson, or his temporary replacement, the reformed villain and former pederast Sergeant Hatred; and the family's self-proclaimed archnemesis, The Monarch, a butterfly-themed supervillain. Initially conceived as a satire of boy adventurer and Space Age fiction prevalent in the early 1960s, it is considered to be an action/adventure series with both comedic, dramatic, and worldbuilding elements.

== Characters ==
The characters of The Venture Bros. are largely re-imaginings of characters from Jonny Quest as well as comic book superheroes and supervillains.

Cast members
James Urbaniak	Christopher McCulloch	Michael Sinterniklaas
Dr. Thaddeus "Rusty" Venture, Phantom Limb, Jonas Venture Jr., Various voices	Hank Venture, The Monarch Various voices	Dean Venture, various voices
Patrick Warburton	Doc Hammer	Steven Rattazzi
Brock Samson	Dr. Mrs. The Monarch, Billy Quizboy, Henchman 21, Dermott Fictel, Various voices	Dr. Byron Orpheus, Haranguetan, various voices

- Dr. Thaddeus "Rusty" Venture (voiced by James Urbaniak), a former boy adventurer and inspiration for the "Rusty Venture" cartoon series, runs what remains of Venture Industries, a once-leading global corporation established by his super-scientist adventurer father Jonas. Since Jonas's death, Venture Industries has declined to a shadow of its former glory, now occupying only a portion of the vast and deteriorating Venture compound and external locations including a base on Spider Skull Island, which his father captured, and the space station Gargantua-1, which his father built. Rusty dropped out of college shortly after his father's death and his academic credentials have been questioned. It is stated he only holds an honorary degree from a Tijuana community college. He attempts to follow in his father's footsteps by becoming a super-scientist himself. His competence frequently falls short of his father's and he often demonstrates questionable ethics, leading others to claim that his occasional successes merely capitalize on the work of his late father.
- Hank (voiced by Chris McCulloch) and Dean Venture (voiced by Michael Sinterniklaas) are the titular fraternal twin brothers of the show. Hank is the more adventurous and Dean is the more timid and bookish of the two brothers. The two teenaged brothers often wind up in perilous situations, and (as revealed in the second season) have been killed over a dozen times, only to be replaced with exact clones who have no memory of their own deaths. The title The Venture Bros. has taken on different meanings throughout the series with the introduction of Rusty's fraternal twin brother Jonas Jr., and Hank and Dean's illegitimate paternal half-brother, Dermott Fictel. The identity of Hank and Dean's mother remains the subject of some debate. At the end of the series finale movie The Venture Bros.: Radiant is the Blood of the Baboon Heart it is revealed that Rusty Venture grew the boys in an artificial womb that he attached to his own abdomen, and it is suggested that Deborah Majeure, daughter of supervillain Force Majeure and actress Bobbi St. Simone, is the boys' genetic mother.
- Brock Samson (voiced by Patrick Warburton) is the longstanding bodyguard to the Venture family. Appointed by the Office of Secret Intelligence (OSI), the muscular and hyper-masculine Brock frequently uses his license to kill to protect the Venture family from any threat with sudden and brutal violence. He is a ruthless (and somewhat sadistic) hand-to-hand combatant, usually preferring to use a combat knife, his hands and feet, or his vintage Dodge Charger rather than firearms; the Monarch refers to him fearfully as Venture's "Swedish murder machine" ("Dia de Los Dangerous!"). In the fourth season, Brock Samson is replaced as a bodyguard by Sergeant Hatred (voiced by McCulloch), a former supervillain. Prior to becoming their bodyguard, Hatred was assigned to be the Venture family's arch-enemy. Hatred is also a "cured" pedophile; his pedophilia is actually controlled by an experimental drug ("Nomolestol") given to him by the OSI and its effectiveness has varied wildly between episodes. Season 6 sees Samson return to his position as the Venture's official bodyguard while Sgt. Hatred becomes security for the new Venture compound in New York City.
- Dr. Venture's deceased father, Dr. Jonas Venture (voiced by Paul Boocock), was the model super-scientist of his day. He was a visionary who changed the world with his inventions and stands as the inspiration for most other protagonists in the series. He formed "Team Venture", a collection of friends and associates that helped him fight crime and subsequently save his son (Dr. Venture) from his arch-enemies. To help his son cope without a mother figure, he developed a loyal and rather emotional robot named H.E.L.P.eR. (listed in episode credits as voiced by "Soul-Bot") that accompanies and assists the Ventures. Early in the series, he was portrayed as a model man and father. However, later episodes show him as callous and uncaring about his son's well-being, while showcasing questionable ethics, both medically and socially. In the fourth-season episode "Self-Medication", there is a scene showing the young Rusty Venture receiving psychotherapy from his father. As Rusty says that he longs for a normal childhood, Jonas is shown to have snuck out of his study while Rusty elaborates upon his desire to not follow in his footsteps; after tiptoeing back to his desk, Jonas interrupts him and insists that Rusty blames his father for all of his problems, and is ungrateful for the opportunities given to him. In general, Jonas' portrayal has shown him to be less and less of a sympathetic character as the series progresses, eventually leading Rusty to proclaim that he was a "far worse" father than he is.

Throughout the series, the Venture family has had various recurring antagonists. Many are current or former members of The Guild of Calamitous Intent, an organization founded to save mankind from self-destruction, but which now serves as an ad hoc placement agency matching super villains with appropriate heroic nemeses. The organization is run by the mysterious leader known only as "The Sovereign", who is revealed to be real-life rock star David Bowie in episode 26, though in episode 5 of the 5th season it is revealed that The Sovereign is actually a shape-shifter who frequently appears as Bowie.

- The Venture Family's primary nemesis is the pernicious but ineffective super-villain the Monarch (voiced by McCulloch). Assuming the motif of a monarch butterfly and "arching" Dr. Venture since college, the Monarch will stop at nothing to antagonize Dr. Venture (even though his motive is unknown). Accompanying the Monarch is the masculine-voiced Dr. Girlfriend (voiced by Doc Hammer), referred to by the Monarch as "Dr. Mrs. The Monarch" after their wedding.
- Baron Werner Ünterbheit (voiced by T. Ryder Smith) is a former dictator of Ünterland and bears a grudge against Venture. He blames Venture for the loss of his jaw in college, explaining "One is always supposed to look out for one's lab partner!" The season three premiere reveals that the Monarch was responsible for the explosion that destroyed Ünterbheit's jaw, in an early attempt to kill Venture.
- Phantom Limb (voiced by James Urbaniak) is another villain, a former lover of Dr. Girlfriend, and a rival to the Monarch. He is very snobby and debonair, and has invisible arms, which can produce energy and electrocute opponents. Phantom Limb was a high-ranking Guild member, until he tried to usurp the Sovereign.
- The Ventures' friends and acquaintances include expert necromancer Doctor Byron Orpheus (voiced by Steven Rattazzi) and his apathetic, teenage goth daughter Triana (voiced by Lisa Hammer), who rent a portion of the Venture Compound; the albino computer scientist Pete White (voiced by McCulloch), a former college friend of Dr. Venture's; hydrocephalic "boy genius" Master Billy Quizboy (voiced by Hammer); and Dr. Jonas Venture, Jr. (voiced by James Urbaniak), Dr. Venture's formerly parasitic fraternal twin brother who has succeeded in all of the areas that Rusty does not. Surviving members of the original Team Venture have also appeared as well as Dr. Orpheus's teammates in the Order of the Triad.

== Episodes ==
Season	Episodes		Originally released		
Season	Episodes		First released	Last released	Network
Pilot			February 16, 2003		Adult Swim
1	13		August 7, 2004	October 30, 2004	Adult Swim
Special			December 19, 2004		Adult Swim
2	13		June 25, 2006	October 15, 2006	Adult Swim
3	13		June 1, 2008	August 24, 2008	Adult Swim
4	16	8	October 18, 2009	December 13, 2009	Adult Swim
4	16	8	September 12, 2010	November 21, 2010	Adult Swim
Special			August 28, 2011		Adult Swim
Special			October 28, 2012		Adult Swim
5	8		June 2, 2013	July 21, 2013	Adult Swim
Special			January 19, 2015		Adult Swim
6	8		January 31, 2016	March 20, 2016	Adult Swim
7	10		August 5, 2018	October 7, 2018	Adult Swim
Film			July 21, 2023		Adult Swim

Most episodes begin with a cold open and are shot to appear to be in letter-box format. Almost every episode features both a smash cut into the end credits, and a short scene following the credits. The second season of the series premiered on the internet via Adult Swim Fix on June 23, 2006, and on television on June 25, 2006; the season finished on October 15, 2006. The considerable delay between the end of the first season and the start of the second was partially caused by Adult Swim's delay in deciding whether to renew the show, primarily because the show is drawn and inked in the traditional animation style (albeit digitally), causing each episode to take considerable time to move through production. Additionally, the producers were dealing with the time constraints of producing a first-season DVD that contained live action interviews and commentary for several episodes.

The third season began on June 1, 2008, and marked the beginning of the show's broadcast in high-definition. A 15-minute rough cut of "The Doctor Is Sin" aired on April 1, 2008, as part of Adult Swim's April Fool's Day theme of airing sneak peeks of new episodes. The fourth season was split into two segments airing a year apart, with the first eight episodes airing in the fall of 2009 and the remaining episodes in fall of 2010. A note contained in the closing credits of the Season 4 finale indicated that the series would continue into the fifth season.

On February 6, 2013, it was announced that Season 5 would premiere on May 19, 2013. This was later shifted to June 2, 2013, at midnight.

On July 8, 2013, Doc Hammer and Jackson Publick stated in an interview with Slate Magazine that they had begun writing the sixth season as of Summer 2013 and that it would enter full-production in September 2013. They tentatively stated that Season 6 would premiere in Fall of 2014, or very early 2015 at the latest. This estimated season-debut date turned out to be extremely premature as Season 6 premiered at Midnight, February 1, 2016.

Jackson Publick confirmed on Twitter that Season 7 of The Venture Brothers would be aired on Adult Swim in "Summer" 2018. On June 27, it was confirmed via Adult Swim's Instagram page that Season 7 would begin August 5, 2018. For this season, Publick stepped back from directing, assuming the role of supervising director. Two-time directing partner and storyboard director for season six, Juno Lee, took over as the series director. Barry J. Kelly also served as Lee's co-director.

== Development ==
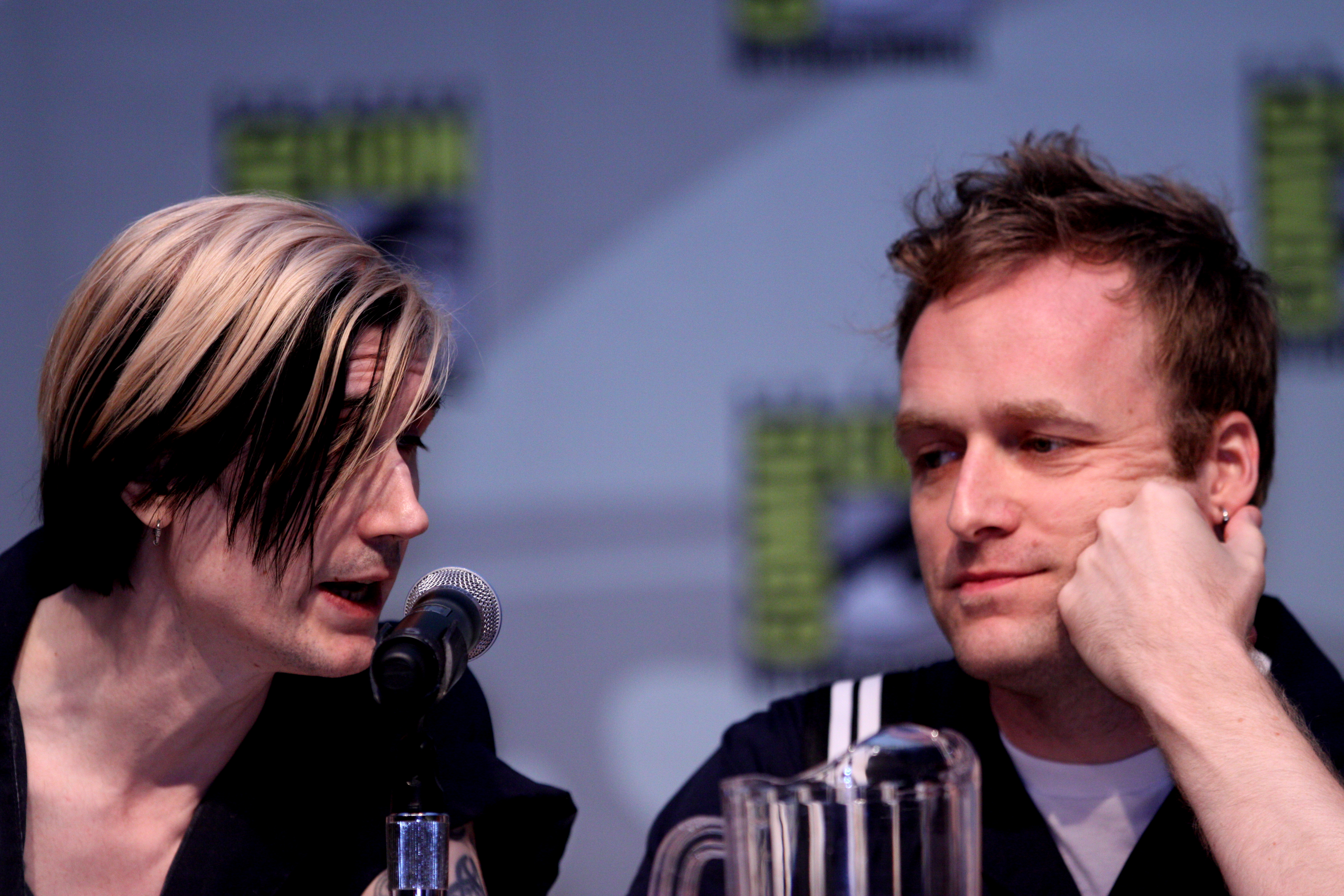
Series co-writers Doc Hammer (left) and Jackson Publick (right) at the 2010 San Diego Comic-Con

Show creator Jackson Publick was one of the main writers for the Saturday morning animated series The Tick. He created The Venture Bros. storyline sometime prior to 2000. After working for the television program Sheep in the Big City and the live-action version of The Tick, Publick set to turning The Venture Bros. into an animated series. The Venture Bros. was originally conceived as a comic book story for an issue of Monkeysuit. Publick realized that his notes were too extensive for a short comics story and proposed that Comedy Central air The Venture Bros. as an animated series, but the network rejected it. Although the first draft of the pilot script was written in the spring of 2000, the premise was not greenlit until around the summer of 2002 by Adult Swim. Publick had not previously considered Cartoon Network because he "didn't want to tone The Venture Bros. down," and was unaware of the existence of the network's late night adult-oriented programming block, Adult Swim.

With the revised pilot, production began in autumn of that year, and the pilot was first run on February 16, 2003. The first season of the series was completed and premiered in 2004, and it was added to the summer schedule in August.

=== Cancellation ===
After the conclusion of the seventh season in October 2018, the series was announced to be renewed for an eighth and final season. On September 5, 2020, one of the show's illustrators, Ken Plume, tweeted that The Venture Bros. was cancelled. Jackson Publick confirmed two days later that the show was cancelled. The script for Season 8 had been partially written at the time of its cancellation a few months before the public announcement.

== Film ==
=== The Venture Bros.: Radiant Is the Blood of the Baboon Heart ===
Following the cancellation, Adult Swim stated via Twitter that "We also want more Venture Bros. and have been working with Jackson and Doc to find another way to continue the Venture Bros. story". On November 13, 2020, HBO Max general manager Andy Forssell tweeted that HBO Max was "working on" reviving The Venture Bros.

On May 12, 2021, it was announced that a direct-to-video film based on The Venture Bros. was in production from Adult Swim.

On April 18, 2023, it was revealed that the film would be titled The Venture Bros.: Radiant is the Blood of the Baboon Heart, which would serve as the finale to the series. It was released digitally on July 21, as well as on Blu-Ray/DVD on July 25, 2023.

== International broadcast ==
In Canada, The Venture Bros. previously aired on Teletoon's Teletoon at Night block and later G4's Adult Digital Distraction block. The series currently airs on the Canadian version of Adult Swim.

== Themes, homages, and references ==
=== Jonny Quest ===
Comparing the main characters of The Venture Bros. and Jonny Quest

The series' principal reference is to Hanna-Barbera's 1964 animated science fiction adventure television series Jonny Quest, as it is the basis for many of the main characters. Dr. Venture is modelled after what a child such as Jonny Quest might have grown up to be like after having lived through a childhood filled with bizarre, life-threatening events. Brock is modelled on Race Bannon. The Venture boys are based on the Hardy Boys and take the places of Jonny and Hadji. One newspaper critic remarked, "If filmmakers Woody Allen and Sam Peckinpah had collaborated on Jonny Quest, it would have come out a lot like this." Despite the homage and references, Jonny Quest himself, as well as Hadji, Race Bannon, and their arch-nemesis, Dr. Zin appear as characters on the show. Cartoon Network's sister company Warner Bros. Entertainment, which owns the rights to the series through Hanna-Barbera, restricted the use of their characters, with Jonny Quest appearing as "Action Johnny", and Dr. Zin as "Dr. Z".

=== Failure as a recurring theme ===
Publick and Hammer have stated that one of the primary themes of The Venture Bros. is failure. Hammer in 2006 said, "Yeah, failure, that's what Venture Bros. is all about. Beautiful sublime failure."

In the creator commentary for the episode "Home Insecurity", Hammer and Publick elaborated on the theme. Publick stated:

This show... If you'll permit me to get a 'big picture', this show is actually all about failure. Even in the design, everything is supposed to be kinda the death of the space-age dream world. The death of the jet-age promises.

Hammer responded:

It's about the beauty of failure. It's about that failure happens to all of us...Every character is not only flawed, but sucks at what they do, and is beautiful at it and Jackson and I suck at what we do, and we try to be beautiful at it, and failure is how you get by...It shows that failure's funny, and it's beautiful and it's life, and it's okay, and it's all we can write because we are big...failures. (laughs)

In 2013, Publick and Hammer discussed moving away from the theme and embracing the "successes" of the characters as well. Publick stated:

I think you and I are both sick of every interview mentioning the "It's a show about failure" from five years ago. I don't think we made a conscious effort to fight that or anything, but every year, we push what we do as writers a little more. An area we hadn't gone into very much was positivity. I mean, all our victories are still satiric, but there are definitely places where we said, "I want to see these guys do something. I don't want to just have everything fall on its face all the time."

In a 2023 interview with Chapo Trap House producer Chris Wade, Hammer clarifies that:

Failure is always something that we always embraced, but we never embraced it as this kind of clarion call between the two of us. We never just woke up one day and he calls me and he's like "I've cracked the code: we're about failure." ... It's part of life, and we wrote about life. And I know it's a cartoon, and I know it's about superheroes, and superscience, and villains, but for us, it was about life. It was about relationships, it was about existence, it was about growing up in society with toxic masculinity. It's about everything that we experienced, and we just threw it into a show and hoped it was funny. And failure is one of the things that we think is funny, inevitable, and absolutely beautiful. But so is tiny successes, so is the rise of [Henchman] 21. These are absolutely beautiful things and I think, you know [the] show was never about failure, but we embrace the beauty of failure.

=== Intergenerational trauma & growth as writers ===
In 2023, shortly before the release of the series finale Radiant Is the Blood of the Baboon Heart, Hammer and Publick further expanded on the evolution of the series' themes, and their feelings on what has been the main theme over the course of the series. "We can go in there and armchair diagnose our characters: Doc is a... narcissist. He was made that way by his father." Publick continued, saying that "This is kinda about escaping your generational, parental kind of bullshit, to some extent." Given that much of Rusty's shortcomings as an adult stem from the emotional abuse he endured from his father and Team Venture, many episodes deal directly with Rusty trying his best to be a good father - if not a better father than his own. "This is - this is everywhere; this is the road to forgiveness. You have to embrace this, and not perpetuate it. The Venture Brothers wasn't trying to be public service announcement... it was trying to entertain you in a way that kinda made you feel uncomfortable, but helped you learn about yourself, as you were watching it."

In the same interview, Hammer continues on, saying that having a show in production for such a length of time allowed them to process their own growth as creators, and how much the early seasons were a product of the social norms of their time. "We made our mistakes as creators. We've done some things that we look back on and go, 'boy, that was a young kid trying to be funny.' ... Luckily, we were on the air long enough to go: 'Please forgive us', and 'This is I think what we're talking about here'." Hammer highlights the verbal repartee between Jonas Venture Jr. and the Monarch in the season 3 episode "The Lepidopterists", in which the Monarch calls Ned, a character with Down syndrome, a "retard", and is chastised by J.J. accordingly. "We very much lampshaded our ideas like idiots."

== Reception ==
The show received critical acclaim over its run. The Venture Bros. ranked at #56 on the IGN "Best 100 Animated Series" list. In 2013, Slate's Chris Wade called The Venture Bros. "one of the best shows on television" and praised the detailed serial nature of the humor with a favorable comparison to Arrested Development. Also in 2013, The Atlantic's Armin Rosen compared the show favourably to The Simpsons, noting that the two shows held the same "slacker optimism" and great comedy. The A.V. Club's Zach Handlen commented in 2012 that the show had evolved over its seasons into a "meta-commentary on a whole sub-section of male nerd culture" and that it had become one of the funniest contemporary shows.

Critical reception to the first season was more mixed than later seasons but was still mostly positive. The A.V. Club's Emily St. James felt that the pop-culture references of the first season fell flat, especially in the beginning of the season, but grew better and funnier as the show's emotional core took hold. Mike Drucker, writing for IGN, criticized the predictability of some first-season episodes, but noted that the show was "a refreshing cartoon because it willingly indulges in the sitcom fad of the '90s".

In 2013 IGN placed The Venture Bros. as number 12 on their list of Top 25 animated series for adults. In January 2021, Sean Cubillas of Comic Book Resources (CBR) described the series as "one of the most well-written superhero series of all time," a stand-out in the field of adult animation, and said it had "witty writing, tot [sic] pacing, and large yet complex cast of characters."

== Home media ==
The first season of The Venture Bros. on DVD was released on May 30, 2006, as officially announced by Warner Home Video. It coincided with the June 25 premiere of the second season. Originally, it was scheduled for March 14, 2006, but was delayed until May 30, 2006. The DVD packaging and interior art was created by comic artist Bill Sienkiewicz. On May 31, 2006, the season one DVD reached #1 on Amazon's top selling DVDs list.

On March 27, 2010, series creator Jackson Publick revealed on his Livejournal that a standard definition DVD of the first half of season 4 would likely be released sometime between July and October 2010, with a DVD of the second half of the season and a Blu-ray box set of the entire season to be released after the full season has aired.

On March 28, 2023, it was announced the series will have a complete series DVD set which was released on June 13, 2023, from Warner Bros. Discovery Home Entertainment. It was also released on digital.

The first four seasons are available in the UK (both halves of Season 4 are sold as a set). Madman Entertainment have also released all seven seasons on DVD in Australia. No Blu-ray editions have yet been released in Australia. It's also the first Adult Swim series in Australia to be given a restricted MA15+ rating for Season 1 and later the higher R18+ rating for Season 4 Part 2, due to strong dialogue in the finale episode.

Season		Episodes		Release date	Additional Information
Season		Episodes		Region 1	Additional Information
1	2004	13		May 30, 2006	This two-disc set includes all thirteen episodes from the first season. The episodes are presented as broadcast, with bleeped profanity. Bonus features include "The Terrible Secret of Turtle Bay" (the pilot) and "A Very Venture Christmas", deleted scenes, behind the scenes mockumentary with the Venture Bros. Cast and creators commentaries on "Mid-Life Chrysalis", "Eeney, Meeney, Miney... Magic!", "Tag Sale – You're It!", "Ghosts of the Sargasso", "Return to Spider-Skull Island", and "The Terrible Secret of Turtle Bay".
2	2006	13		April 17, 2007	This two-disc set includes all thirteen episodes from the second season. As with the Season 1 DVD release, any nudity has been covered with black bars and the profanity has been censored. Bonus features include commentary on every episode by Jackson Publick and Doc Hammer and, for some episodes, "special guests" such as voice actors James Urbaniak and Michael Sinterniklaas. Features also include deleted scenes and a tour of Astro-base Go!.
3	2008	13		March 24, 2009	This two-disc set includes all thirteen episodes from the third season. Unlike the previous DVD releases, Season 3 is uncensored, with all profanity and nudity intact. Bonus features include deleted scenes and commentary. The season was also released on Blu-ray, which is packaged with a soundtrack CD that includes 20 tracks comprising the score from the season. The box cover is based on the box covers of many video games on the Atari 2600. Although the Blu-ray is only available in the "Region A" zone, it functions in the "Region B" zone also.
4	2009	16	8	October 26, 2010	This one-disc DVD set includes the first eight episodes from the fourth season. Similar to the Season 3 set, all episodes are uncensored. Bonus features include deleted scenes and commentary. Both halves of Season 4 were released on the Season 4 Blu-ray. The Blu-ray special features are uncensored and the final episode of this release has the option to be played with censored or uncensored audio. The rest of the episodes have censored visuals but audio remains uncensored. The streams available at Adult Swim are all censored.
4	2010	16	8	March 22, 2011	This one-disc DVD set includes the final eight episodes from the fourth season. Similar to the Season 3 set, all episodes are uncensored. Bonus features include deleted scenes and commentary. Both halves of Season 4 were released on the Season 4 Blu-ray.
5	2013	8		March 4, 2014	This two-disc DVD or one disc Blu-ray set includes all eight episodes from the fifth season, plus 2 bonus episodes ("A Very Venture Halloween" and "From the Ladle to the Grave: The Shallow Gravy Story"), audio commentary from Jackson Publick and Doc Hammer, and deleted scenes.
6	2016	8		October 4, 2016	This two-disc DVD or one disc Blu-ray set includes all eight episodes from the sixth season, plus 1 bonus episode ("All This and Gargantua-2"), audio commentary from Jackson Publick and Doc Hammer, and deleted scenes.
7	2018	10		June 4, 2019	This two-disc DVD or one disc Blu-ray set includes all ten episodes from the seventh season, including audio commentary from Jackson Publick and Doc Hammer, and deleted scenes.

=== The "lost DVD commentary" ===
Jackson Publick revealed that he and Doc Hammer had recorded a commentary track for the season one episode "Home Insecurity". Warner Home Video chose to omit this track from the Season One DVD due to space limitations and some minor sound quality issues. Publick also stated that the commentary could be downloaded.

=== Soundtrack CD ===
For the video release of the Season 3, a soundtrack album was also released, titled The Venture Bros.: The Music of JG Thirlwell. This is the same audio CD included as a bonus with the Blu-ray version of Season 3. While the CD release was originally made available at Adult Swim's website, it was given a wide release on May 12, 2009; the vinyl LP release came out a month earlier. It can also be downloaded from most major digital retailers. The CD features 20 tracks, while the vinyl LP release is 16 tracks and a download link of the complete release including the songs omitted from the LP.

Music of The Venture Bros: Vol 2 was released digitally on April 10, 2016 and on CD and Vinyl on June 3, 2016. The album was released on Thirlwell's own Ectopic Ents label in collaboration with Williams Street Records.
