= Betagel =

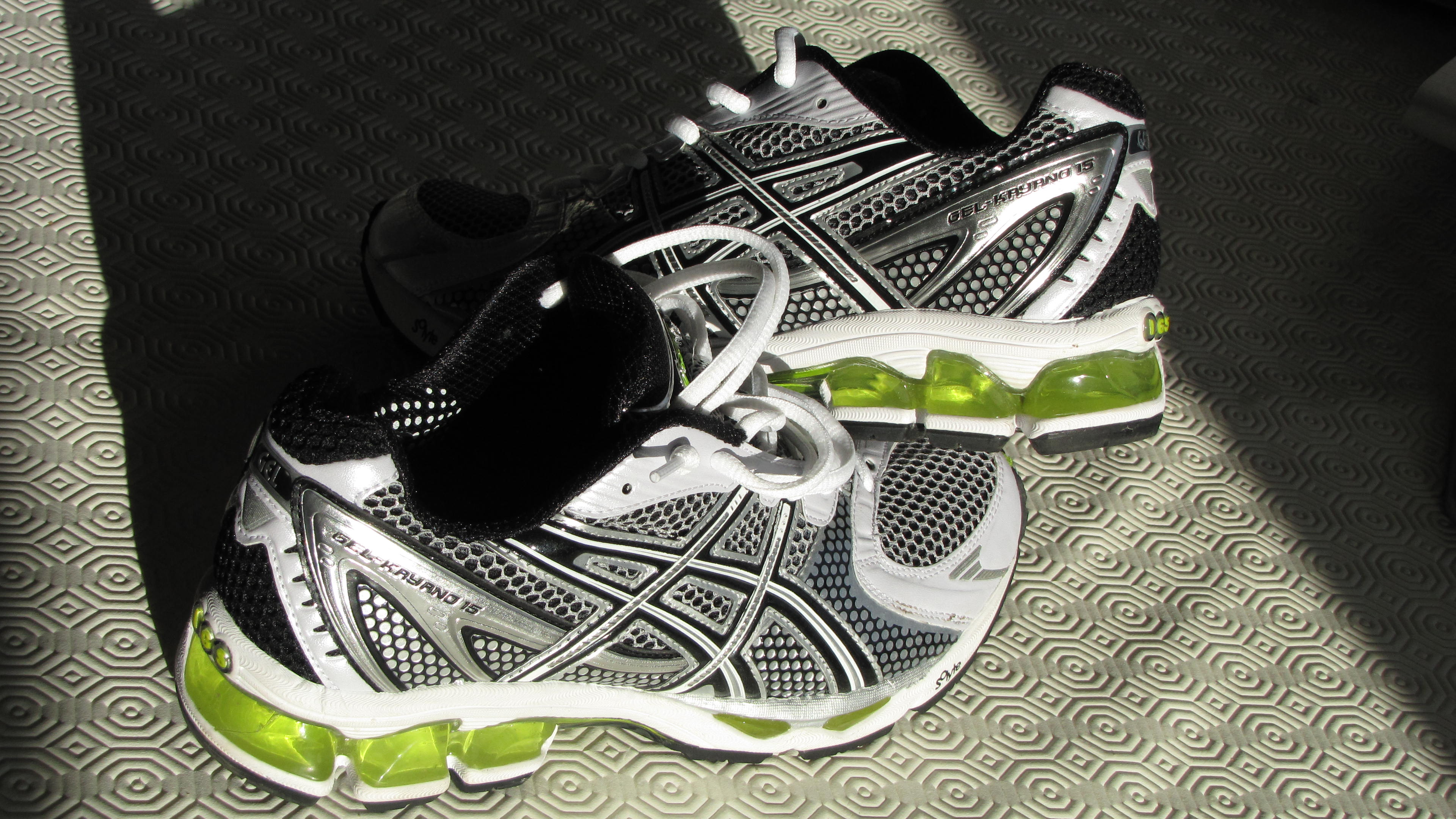
The ASICS Gel Kayano 15 shoes with some Betagel in yellow into the heel.

Betagel (βゲル in Japanese) is a material invented in Japan that utilizes gel and silicone to absorb violent shocks.

Japanese researchers developed "Alphagel", which was principally used in the manufacture of sneakers and as a shock-absorber for tennis racquets. Betagel, a more effective formulation, was so named according to the Greek Alphabet (alpha, beta, gamma etc.), in which letters also serve as numerals. It is also principally used in sneakers.

The gel is also used in scientific applications.
