= Vein (Foetus album) =

Remix album by Foetus
- Released: October 22, 2007
- Recorded: 2005
- Genre: Industrial, experimental rock
- Length: 50:20
- Label: Ectopic Ents
- Producer: J. G. Thirlwell

Foetus chronology
Damp (2006)	Vein (2007)	Limb (2009)

J. G. Thirlwell chronology
Damp (2006)	Vein (2007)	The Venture Bros.: The Music of JG Thirlwell (2009)

Professional ratings
Review scores
Source	Rating
AllMusic	(unrated)

Vein is a remix album by Foetus, released on October 22, 2007 by Ectopic Ents. It contains remixes of songs from the studio album Love, including a b-side from the (not adam) EP.

== Track listing ==
All tracks are written by J. G. Thirlwell.

No.	Title	Length
1.	"Pareidolia" (Fennesz remix)	4:54
2.	"How to Vibrate" (Mike Patton remix)	4:16
3.	"Mon Agonie Douce" (J. G. Thirlwell remix)	6:15
4.	"L'Overture" (Jay Wasco remix)	3:57
5.	"Don't Want Me Anymore" (Tujiko Noriko remix)	5:00
6.	"(not adam)" (Jason Forrest remix)	4:04
7.	"Thrush" (Trztn of Services remix)	4:29
8.	"Aladdin Reverse" (Tweaker remix)	6:22
9.	"Not in Yr Hands" (Matmos remix)	4:46
10.	"Carrodia Gravis" (Tom Recchion remix)	6:17

== Personnel ==
Adapted from the Vein liner notes.

- J. G. Thirlwell (as Foetus) – vocals, instruments, producer, recording, design
- Heung-Heung Chin – art direction
- Fred Kevorkian – mastering

== Release history ==
Region	Date	Label	Format	Catalog
United States	2007	Ectopic Ents	CD	ECT ENTS 029
