= Music Together =

Musical education program for small children

- Headquarters: Hopewell, New Jersey, U.S.
- Website: musictogether.com

Music Together is a musical education program for children aged Newborn through second grade. First offered to the public in 1987, the program now has more than 3,000 locations in 40 different countries.

Since its inception, Music Together has emphasized the importance of having parents and caregivers actively participate in class with their children. This is based in part on the work of early childhood educator Lilian Katz, who believes that while children can learn skills and knowledge from any adult, they learn dispositions only from their loved ones; by participating in class as musical role-models, parents and caregivers help impart to their children the disposition to become lifelong music-makers.

== Philosophy ==
Music Together's basic philosophy is that all children are musical, and that they can achieve basic music competence provided their music environment is sufficiently rich. All class activities are based on developmentally appropriate practice, an approach to learning that takes into account how children learn at different developmental stages in their lives. Because very young children learn primarily through play, the program attempts to provide a fun, relaxed environment with a nonformal teaching approach.

== Repertoire and recordings ==
Music Together is noted for a repertoire which emphasizes the use of a wide variety of musical modes (tonalities) and metres. With much of music —especially “children’s music”—using predominantly major scales and duple metre, it is difficult for children to gain a breadth of music experience. The Music Together repertoire includes songs in such tonalities as Phrygian mode, aeolian mode, Mixolydian mode, and Dorian mode. Children are also introduced to songs using triple metre and “unusual” metres such as 5/4 or 7/8. In this way, the Music Together repertoire helps strengthen children’s audiation, a termed coined by learning theorist Edwin Gordon to describe the process by which people mentally hear and comprehend music. The ability to adiate is essential to any meaningful music learning.

There are nine non-sequential Music Together song collections, named Bongos, Bells, Triangle, Fiddle, Drum, Tambourine, Flutes, Sticks and Maracas, forming a three-year cycle taught in fall, winter, and spring semesters. There are also three summer collections, originally named Summer Songs I, Summer Songs II, and Summer Songs III but in 2019 renamed Harmonica, Banjo and Kazoo respectively, which are compilations carefully designed not to include songs from the spring collections before them or the fall collections after them. Families receive one CD and a code to download all of the songs each semester, along with an accompanying illustrated songbook, to facilitate at-home family music-making. The recordings feature a “family” of singers, representing a mother, father, child, grandmother, and uncle.

== History ==
Music Together was founded by Kenneth K. Guilmartin, a composer and musician certified in Dalcroze Eurhythmics. In 1985 Guilmartin founded the Centre for Music and Young Children (CMYC) to research and develop early childhood music programs for Birch Tree Group, Ltd., publishers of the Suzuki Method.

In 1986 Guilmartin began to collaborate with Lili M. Levinowitz, Ph.D., at that time a doctoral student directing the Children’s Music Development Program at Temple University. Levinowitz was a student of learning theorist Edwin Gordon, known for his Music Learning Theory. Guilmartin and Levinowitz were influenced by Gordon’s work, and included tonal patterns and rhythm patterns based on his work in their new program.

Music Together was first offered to the public in 1987 in a suburb of Philadelphia. After a brief residence at Westminster Conservatory of Music in Princeton, NJ, the company moved to a studio on Nassau Street in Princeton in 1989, the same year that it offered its first teacher training. In 1997, the year of its tenth anniversary, the company moved to 66 Witherspoon St. in Princeton, with room for its lab school as well as offices. In 2006, the company moved into a newly renovated 15,000-square-foot (1,400 m^{2}) building in Hopewell, NJ, just outside Princeton.

== See also ==
- Developmentally Appropriate Musical Practice (DAMP), a series of musical experiences for young children (birth through age 8).
