= Damp (album) =

Compilation album by Foetus
- Released: November 15, 2006
- Recorded: 1995–2006
- Genre: Industrial, experimental rock
- Length: 72:03
- Label: Ectopic Ents
- Producer: J. G. Thirlwell

J. G. Thirlwell chronology
Love (2005)	Damp (2006)	Vein (2007)

Damp is a compilation album by experimental/industrial band Foetus, released in November 2006 by Ectopic Ents. Damp collects previously unreleased material written since 2003, new recordings of rare Foetus material and tracks written by and/or featuring The The, Melvins, and Rotoskop.

== Track listing ==
All tracks are written by J. G. Thirlwell, except "Shrunken Man", written by Matt Johnson (singer), "Mine Is No Disgrace" co-written with Buzz Osborne and "Paging Dr. Strong" co-written with Rotoskop.

No.	Title	Length
1.	"I Hate You All"	3:26
2.	"Antabuse"	1:51
3.	"Chimera"	4:54
4.	"Into the Light"	6:32
5.	"Shrunken Man"	4:59
6.	"Mine Is No Disgrace"	8:23
7.	"Hemo the Cuckold"	7:29
8.	"Not in Your Hands"	5:20
9.	"Paging Dr. Strong"	3:51
10.	"Blessed Evening" (Phylr remix)	4:11
11.	"Sieve"	4:59
12.	"Cold Shoulder"	16:08

== Personnel ==
Adapted from the Damp liner notes.

- J. G. Thirlwell (as Foetus) – vocals, instruments, producer, recording, photography, design

Musicians

- King Buzzo – electric guitar (6)
- Phylr – remixing (10)
- Dale Crover – drums (6)
- Jeff Davidson – guitar and bass guitar (11)
- Rotoskop – instruments (9)
- Jay Wasco – drum programming (1)

Production and additional personnel

- Heung-Heung Chin – art direction
- Scott Hull – mastering

== Release history ==
Region	Date	Label	Format	Catalog
United States	2006	Ectopic Ents	CD	ECT ENTS 028
