= Moist =

Moist, describing the presence of moisture, may refer to:

== Music ==
- Moist (band), a Canadian alternative rock band
- "Moist", a song by Janet Jackson from her 2004 album Damita Jo

== People ==
- MoistCr1TiKaL, American YouTuber, Twitch streamer and musician
- Paul Moist, Canadian union leader

== Other uses ==
- Moist, a fictional character from Joss Whedon's Dr. Horrible's Sing-Along Blog
- Moist von Lipwig, a fictional character in Terry Pratchett's Discworld series
- Moists (or Mohists), followers of the Chinese philosophy called Mohism (or Moism)
