= Developmentally Appropriate Musical Practice =

Developmentally Appropriate Musical Practice (DAMP) is a series of musical experiences that educators can provide to young children (birth through Age 8) during the school day. These experiences can provide a positive influence on the social, emotional, physical, and intellectual development of these children

DAMP experiences are grounded in research studies in music education and early childhood education.

== History of Developmentally Appropriate Musical Practice ==
DAMP was coined in 2011 by music education researcher Dr. Guerino Terracciano while conducting a study for the effect of a hands-on music education in-service program on early childhood educators’ attitude, knowledge, and self-efficacy for providing DAMP in the learning environment with young children.

Terracciano states the following:

Several studies have investigated the effect of music education on the early childhood educators’ capacity for promoting Developmentally Appropriate Musical Practice (DAMP) in the learning environment with young children (de l’Etoile; Nicholas; Rogers, Hallam, Creech, & Preti; Saunders & Baker ). For example, these studies show that when providing educators with quality musical resources, they are able to gain the confidence and the knowledge to successfully promote musical experiences during the traditional school day. On the other hand, these studies also suggest that music education has an effect on the young child’s social, emotional, physical, and intellectual development.

Music education in relationship to cognitive development has been acknowledged throughout history (Dewey; Gardner; Collins, Griess, Carither, & Castillo ). For example, in the areas of language and literacy development young children have the propensity to learn their everyday spoken language by acquiring the vocabulary words through active engagement during music activities (Moomaw & Davis ). (p. 1)

== Types of Developmentally Appropriate Musical Practice (DAMP) ==
=== Music and movement ===
According to the book titled Smart Moves, learning is not all in our head. Hannaford stated that the more young children move the better they will learn. As a result, movement stimulates neurological development, which explains the potential it has on the learning process. Consequently, Gordon suggests that promoting movement while learning has the potential to expand the child's nerve network wiring system, therefore facilitating understanding of the element of rhythm. Gordon's empirical research goes on to explain that young children construct musical understanding through movement. Gordon looked at movement as an important learning process that the body must undergo in order for the learner to gain a comprehensive understanding of various elements of music, such as rhythm and melody.

=== The child’s singing voice and musical instruments ===
Giving students the autonomy to pursue music has shown positive results in students acquiring an interest of the subject. For example, Kemple, Batey, and Hartle suggest that exploration and play become vehicles for musical growth. When young children are given access to play a simple instrument, they unintentionally ‘construct’ specific knowledge and information that relates to an area of interest. Fundamentally, through autonomous engagement young children develop intuitively an interest that the classroom teacher is not able to foster through direct instructional methods.

=== Identifying sounds ===
Children's musical interest may vary from exploring a specific instrument to listening to a type of musical literature that the child finds interesting because of his or her cultural background. In other words, early childhood musical interest lies with the involvement that the child is actively engaged in the learning milieu. Morin's article suggests that in order for students to develop a personal interest during the exploration of music, they need opportunities and experiences that have been aligned by the educator as developmentally appropriate. In essence, Morin communicates about the importance of giving young children ample opportunities to explore, manipulate, and play in the classroom.

=== Emergent literacy skills and musical concepts and methods ===
Historically, music education has been deemed an important subject in the lives of young children during their daily learning experiences (Monroe; Rousseau; McDonald; Brosterman ). Since 1838, the Boston School Committee in the United States adopted music as a branch of instruction in their public school system for the purpose of positively affecting students’ academic potential (Abeles, Hoffer, & Klotman ). During this period, music was given importance, based on the assumption that it could humanize, refine, and elevate our elementary learning communities through listening and singing (Greata). Subsequently, one of the first decisions for music instruction was related to its capacity and potential in fostering intellectual growth (Dewey; Seefeldt ).

== See also ==
- Music Together (1987), a music and movement program for newborn through second grade children.
