= Damper =

A damper is a device that deadens, restrains, or depresses. It may refer to:

== Music ==
- Damper pedal, a device that mutes musical tones, particularly in stringed instruments
- A mute for various brass instruments

== Structure ==
- Damper (flow), a mechanical device in a duct or chimney that regulates airflow
- Stockbridge damper, used to suppress wind-induced vibrations on taut cables
- Tuned mass damper, a device mounted in structures to prevent discomfort, damage or structural failure by vibration

== Other uses ==
- Damper (food), a bread of the Australian Outback
- In mechanical engineering, a damper is a device for suppressing vibrations in a mechanical system by dissipating energy.
  - Dashpot, a type of hydraulic or mechanical damper
- Shock absorber (British or technical use: damper), a mechanical device designed to dissipate kinetic energy
- An item of boiler technology used to regulate the fire
- In electronics, a kind of diode intended to absorb energy peaks, normally generated by inductive circuitry

== See also ==
- Damping (disambiguation)
- Attenuator (electronics)
