= Henry Cavendish =

English natural philosopher, and scientist (1731–1810)

The Honourable Henry Cavendish FRS
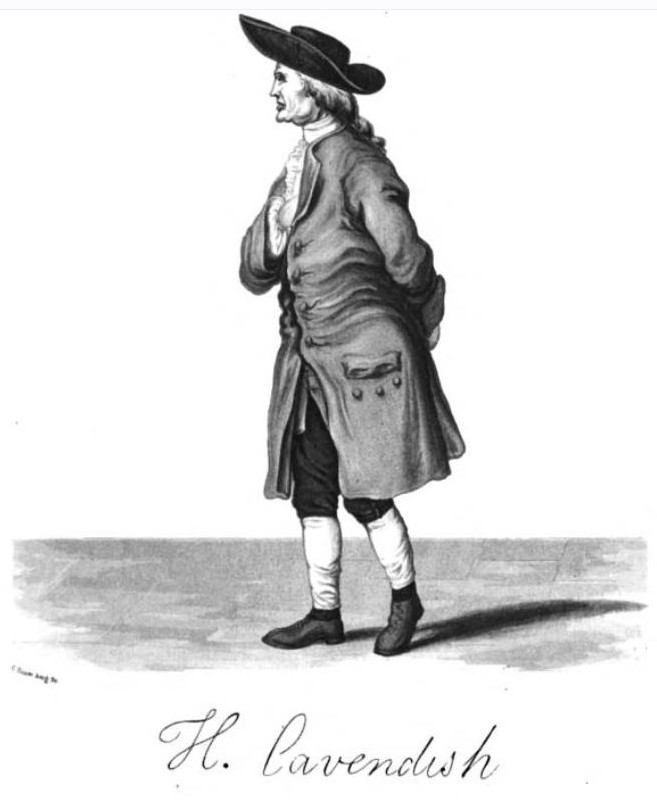
- Born: 10 October 1731; Nice, Kingdom of Sardinia
- Died: 24 February 1810 (aged 78); London, England
- Citizenship: English
- Education: Peterhouse, Cambridge
- Known for: Discovery of hydrogen Measuring the Earth's density (Cavendish experiment)
- Awards: Copley Medal
- Scientific career
- Fields: Chemistry, physics
- Workplaces: Royal Institution

Henry Cavendish (/ˈkævəndɪʃ/ KAV-ən-dish; 10 October 1731 – 24 February 1810) was an English experimental and theoretical chemist and physicist. He is noted for his discovery of hydrogen, which he termed "inflammable air". He described the density of inflammable air, which formed water on combustion, in a 1766 paper, On Factitious Airs. Antoine Lavoisier later reproduced Cavendish's experiment and gave the element its name.

Cavendish, known for his reclusive personality, conducted research notable for its accuracy and precision. His work included researches on the composition of atmospheric air, the properties of different gases, the synthesis of water, the law governing electrical attraction and repulsion, a mechanical theory of heat, and calculations of the density (and hence the mass) of the Earth. The experiment he devised to measure Earth's density, which also informs calculation of the gravitational constant, is now known as the Cavendish experiment.

== Early life ==
Henry Cavendish was born on 10 October 1731 in Nice, where his family was living at the time. His mother was Lady Anne de Grey, fourth daughter of Henry Grey, 1st Duke of Kent, and his father was Lord Charles Cavendish, the third son of William Cavendish, 2nd Duke of Devonshire. The family traced its lineage across eight centuries to Norman times, and was closely connected to many aristocratic families of Great Britain. Henry's mother died in 1733, three months after the birth of her second son, Frederick, and shortly before Henry's second birthday. Henry was styled as "The Honourable Henry Cavendish".

From the age of 11, Cavendish attended Newcome's School, a private school near London. At the age of 18 (on 24 November 1748) he entered the University of Cambridge in St Peter's College, now known as Peterhouse and left three years later on 23 February 1751 without taking a degree (at the time, a common practice). He then lived with his father in London, where he soon had his own laboratory complete with dog-room.

Lord Charles spent his life firstly in politics and then increasingly in science, especially in the Royal Society of London. In 1758, he took Henry to Royal Society meetings, and also to dinners of the Royal Society Club. In 1760, Cavendish was elected to both these groups, and he was assiduous in his attendance after that. He took virtually no part in politics, but followed his father into science, through his researches and his participation in scientific organisations. He was active in the Council of the Royal Society of London, to which he was elected in 1765.

An interest and expertise in the field of scientific instruments led Cavendish to head a committee to review the Royal Society's meteorological instruments and to help assess the instruments of the Royal Greenwich Observatory. His first paper, Factitious Airs, appeared in 1766. Other committees on which he served included the committee of papers, which chose the papers for publication in the Philosophical Transactions of the Royal Society, and the committees for the transit of Venus (1769), for the gravitational attraction of mountains (1774), and for the scientific instructions for Constantine Phipps's expedition (1773) in search of the North Pole and the Northwest Passage. In 1773, Cavendish joined his father as an elected trustee of the British Museum, to which he devoted a good deal of time and effort. Soon after the Royal Institution of Great Britain was established, Cavendish became a manager (1800) and took an active interest, especially in the laboratory, where he observed and helped in Humphry Davy's chemical experiments.

== Chemistry research ==
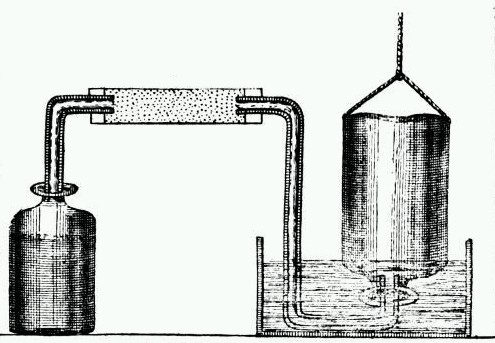
Cavendish's apparatus for making and collecting hydrogen

About the time of his father's death, Cavendish began to work closely with Charles Blagden, an association that helped Blagden enter fully into London's scientific society. In return, Blagden helped to keep the world at a distance from Cavendish. Cavendish published no books and few papers, but he achieved much. Several areas of research, including mechanics, optics, and magnetism, feature extensively in his manuscripts, but they scarcely feature in his published work. Cavendish is considered to be one of the so-called pneumatic chemists of the eighteenth and nineteenth centuries, along with, for example, Joseph Priestley, Joseph Black, and Daniel Rutherford. Cavendish found that a definite, peculiar, and highly inflammable gas, which he referred to as "Inflammable Air", was produced by the action of certain acids on certain metals. This gas was hydrogen, which Cavendish correctly guessed was proportioned two to one in water.

Although others, such as Robert Boyle, had prepared hydrogen gas earlier, Cavendish is usually given the credit for recognising its elemental nature. In 1777, Cavendish discovered that air exhaled by mammals is converted to "fixed air" (carbon dioxide), not "phlogisticated air" as predicted by Joseph Priestley. Also, by dissolving alkalis in acids, Cavendish produced carbon dioxide, which he collected, along with other gases, in bottles inverted over water or mercury. He then measured their solubility in water and their specific gravity, and noted their combustibility. He concluded in his 1778 paper "General Considerations on Acids" that respirable air constitutes acidity. Cavendish was awarded the Royal Society's Copley Medal for this paper. Gas chemistry was of increasing importance in the latter half of the 18th century, and became crucial for Frenchman Antoine-Laurent Lavoisier's reform of chemistry, generally known as the chemical revolution.

In 1783, Cavendish published a paper on eudiometry (the measurement of the goodness of gases for breathing). He described a new eudiometer of his invention, with which he achieved the best results to date, using what in other hands had been the inexact method of measuring gases by weighing them. Then, after a repetition of a 1781 experiment performed by Priestley, Cavendish published a paper on the production of pure water by burning hydrogen in "dephlogisticated air" (air in the process of combustion, now known to be oxygen).

Cavendish concluded that rather than being synthesised, the burning of hydrogen caused water to be condensed from the air. Some physicists interpreted hydrogen as pure phlogiston. Cavendish reported his findings to Priestley no later than March 1783, but did not publish them until the following year. The Scottish inventor James Watt published a paper on the composition of water in 1783; controversy about who made the discovery first ensued.

In 1785, Cavendish investigated the composition of common (i.e. atmospheric) air, obtaining impressively accurate results. He conducted experiments in which hydrogen and ordinary air were combined in known ratios and then exploded with a spark of electricity. Furthermore, he also described an experiment in which he was able to remove, in modern terminology, both the oxygen and nitrogen gases from a sample of atmospheric air until only a small bubble of unreacted gas was left in the original sample. Using his observations, Cavendish observed that, when he had determined the amounts of phlogisticated air (nitrogen) and dephlogisticated air (oxygen), there remained a volume of gas amounting to 1/120 of the original volume of nitrogen. By careful measurements he was led to conclude that "common air consists of one part of dephlogisticated air [oxygen], mixed with four of phlogisticated [nitrogen]".

In the 1890s (around 100 years later) two British physicists, William Ramsay and Lord Rayleigh, realised that their newly discovered inert gas, argon, was responsible for Cavendish's problematic residue; he had not made an error. What he had done was perform rigorous quantitative experiments, using standardised instruments and methods, aimed at reproducible results; taken the mean of the result of several experiments; and identified and allowed for sources of error. The balance that he used, made by a craftsman named Harrison, was the first of the precision balances of the 18th century, and as accurate as Lavoisier's (which has been estimated to measure one part in 400,000). Cavendish worked with his instrument makers, generally improving existing instruments rather than inventing wholly new ones.

Cavendish, as indicated above, used the language of the old phlogiston theory in chemistry. In 1787, he became one of the earliest outside France to convert to the new antiphlogistic theory of Lavoisier, though he remained sceptical about the nomenclature of the new theory. He also objected to Lavoisier's identification of heat as having a material or elementary basis. Working within the framework of Newtonian mechanism, Cavendish had tackled the problem of the nature of heat in the 1760s, explaining heat as the result of the motion of matter.

In 1783, he published a paper on the temperature at which mercury freezes and in that paper made use of the idea of latent heat, although he did not use the term because he believed that it implied acceptance of a material theory of heat. He made his objections explicit in his 1784 paper on air. He went on to develop a general theory of heat, and the manuscript of that theory has been persuasively dated to the late 1780s. His theory was at once mathematical and mechanical: it contained the principle of the conservation of heat (later understood as an instance of conservation of energy) and even included the concept (although not the label) of the mechanical equivalent of heat.

== Density of the Earth ==
Following his father's death, Henry bought another house in town and a house at Clapham Common (built by Thomas Cubitt), at that time located to the south-west of London. The London house contained the bulk of his library, while he kept most of his instruments at Clapham Common, where he carried out most of his experiments. The most famous of those experiments, published in 1798, was to determine the density of the Earth and became known as the Cavendish experiment. The apparatus Cavendish used for weighing the Earth was a modification of the torsion balance built by geologist John Michell, who died before he could begin the experiment. The apparatus was sent in crates to Cavendish, who completed the experiment in 1797–1798 and published the results.

The experimental apparatus consisted of a torsion balance with a pair of 2-inch 1.61-pound lead spheres suspended from the arm of a torsion balance and two much larger stationary lead balls (350 pounds). Cavendish intended to measure the force of gravitational attraction between the two. He noticed that Michell's apparatus would be sensitive to temperature differences and induced air currents, so he made modifications by isolating the apparatus in a separate room with external controls and telescopes for making observations.

Using this equipment, Cavendish calculated the attraction between the balls from the period of oscillation of the torsion balance, and then he used this value to calculate the density of the Earth. Cavendish found that the Earth's average density is 5.48 times greater than that of water. John Henry Poynting later noted that the data should have led to a value of 5.448, and indeed that is the average value of the twenty-nine determinations Cavendish included in his paper. The error in the published number was due to a simple arithmetical mistake on his part. What was extraordinary about Cavendish's experiment was its elimination of every source of error and every factor that could disturb the experiment, and its precision in measuring an astonishingly small attraction, a mere 1/50,000,000 of the weight of the lead balls. The result that Cavendish obtained for the density of the Earth is within 1 per cent of the currently accepted figure.

Cavendish's work led others to accurate values for the gravitational constant (G) and Earth's mass. Based on his results, one can calculate a value for G of 6.754 × 10^{−11}N-m^{2}/kg^{2}, which compares favourably with the modern value of 6.67428 × 10^{−11}N-m^{2}/kg^{2}.

Books often describe Cavendish's work as a measurement of either G or the Earth's mass. Since these are related to the Earth's density by a trivial web of algebraic relations, none of these sources are wrong, but they do not match the exact word choice of Cavendish, and this mistake has been pointed out by several authors. Cavendish's stated goal was to measure the Earth's density.

The first time that the constant got this name was in 1873, almost 100 years after the Cavendish experiment. Cavendish's results also give the Earth's mass.

== Electrical research ==
Cavendish's electrical and chemical experiments, like those on heat, had begun while he lived with his father in a laboratory in their London house. His father died in 1783, leaving almost all of his very substantial estate to Henry. Like his theory of heat, Cavendish's comprehensive theory of electricity was mathematical in form and was based on precise quantitative experiments. Working with his colleague, Timothy Lane, he created an artificial torpedo fish that could dispense electric shocks to show that the source of shock from these fish was electricity. He published an early version of his theory of electricity in 1771, based on an expansive electrical fluid that exerted pressure. He demonstrated that if the intensity of electric force were inversely proportional to distance, then the electric fluid more than that needed for electrical neutrality would lie on the outer surface of an electrified sphere; then he confirmed this experimentally. Cavendish continued to work on electricity after this initial paper, but he published no more on the subject.

Cavendish wrote papers on electrical topics for the Royal Society but the bulk of his electrical experiments did not become known until they were collected and published by James Clerk Maxwell a century later, in 1879, long after other scientists had been credited with the same results. Cavendish's electrical papers from the Philosophical Transactions of the Royal Society of London have been reprinted, together with most of his electrical manuscripts, in The Scientific Papers of the Honourable Henry Cavendish, F.R.S. (1921). According to the 1911 edition of Encyclopædia Britannica, among Cavendish's discoveries were the concept of electric potential (which he called the "degree of electrification"), an early unit of capacitance (that of a sphere one inch in diameter), the formula for the capacitance of a plate capacitor, the concept of the dielectric constant of a material, the relationship between electric potential and current (now called Ohm's law) (1781), laws for the division of current in parallel circuits (now attributed to Charles Wheatstone), and the inverse square law of variation of electric force with distance, now called Coulomb's law.

== Death ==
Cavendish died at Clapham on 24 February 1810 as one of the wealthiest men in Britain, and was buried in the church that is now Derby Cathedral, alongside many of his ancestors. The road he used to live on in Derby has been named after him, as has a road near his house in Clapham, of which the north part is part of the South Circular Road. The Cavendish Laboratory in the University of Cambridge was endowed by one of Cavendish's later relatives, William Cavendish, 7th Duke of Devonshire (Chancellor of the University from 1861 to 1891).

== Personality and legacy ==
Cavendish inherited two fortunes that were so large that Jean Baptiste Biot called him "the richest of all the savants and the most knowledgeable of the rich". At his death, Cavendish was the largest depositor of the Bank of England. A profoundly shy man, he was uncomfortable in society and avoided it when he could. He could speak to only one person at a time and only if the person was known to him and male. He conversed little, always dressed in an old-fashioned suit and developed no known deep personal attachments outside his family. Cavendish was taciturn and solitary and regarded by many as eccentric. He communicated with his female servants only by notes. By one account, Cavendish had a back staircase added to his house to avoid encountering his housekeeper, because he was especially shy of women. The contemporary accounts of his personality have led some modern commentators, such as Oliver Sacks, to speculate that he was autistic.

His only social outlet was the Royal Society Club, whose members dined together before weekly meetings. Cavendish seldom missed these meetings, and was profoundly respected by his contemporaries. However, his shyness made conversation difficult; guests were advised to wander close to him and then speak as if "into vacancy. If their remarks were scientifically worthy, they might receive a mumbled reply". Cavendish was more likely not to reply at all. Cavendish's religious views were also considered eccentric for his time. He was considered to be agnostic. As his biographer, George Wilson, comments, "As to Cavendish's religion, he was nothing at all."

The arrangement of his residence reserved only a fraction of space for personal comfort as his library was detached, the upper rooms and lawn were for astronomical observation and his drawing room was a laboratory with a forge in an adjoining room. He also enjoyed collecting fine furniture, exemplified by his purchase of a set of "ten inlaid satinwood chairs with matching cabriole legged sofa".

Because of his asocial and secretive behaviour, Cavendish often avoided publishing his work, and much of his findings were not told even to his fellow scientists. In the late nineteenth century, long after his death, James Clerk Maxwell looked through Cavendish's papers and found observations and results for which others had been given credit. Examples of what was included in Cavendish's discoveries or anticipations were Richter's law of reciprocal proportions, Ohm's law, Dalton's law of partial pressures, principles of electrical conductivity (including Coulomb's law), and Charles's law of gases. A manuscript "Heat", tentatively dated between 1783 and 1790, describes a "mechanical theory of heat". Hitherto unknown, the manuscript was analysed in the early 21st century. Historian of science Russell McCormmach proposed that "Heat" is the only 18th-century work prefiguring thermodynamics. Theoretical physicist Dietrich Belitz concluded that in this work Cavendish "got the nature of heat essentially right".

As Cavendish performed his famous density of the Earth experiment in an outbuilding in the garden of his Clapham Common estate, his neighbours would point out the building and tell their children that it was where the world was weighed. In honour of Henry Cavendish's achievements and as a result of an endowment granted by Henry's relative William Cavendish, 7th Duke of Devonshire, the University of Cambridge physics laboratory was named the Cavendish Laboratory by Maxwell, who was the first Cavendish Professor of Physics and an admirer of Cavendish's work.

== Selected writings ==
- Cavendish, Henry (1921). Scientific Papers. Vol. 1. Cambridge: Cambridge University Press. – edited by James Clerk Maxwell and revised by Joseph Larmor.
- Cavendish, Henry (1921). Scientific Papers. Vol. 2. Cambridge: Cambridge University Press. – edited by James Clerk Maxwell and revised by Joseph Larmor.
- Cavendish, Henry (1879). James Clerk Maxwell (ed.). The Electrical Researches of the Honourable Henry Cavendish. Cambridge: Cambridge University Press.
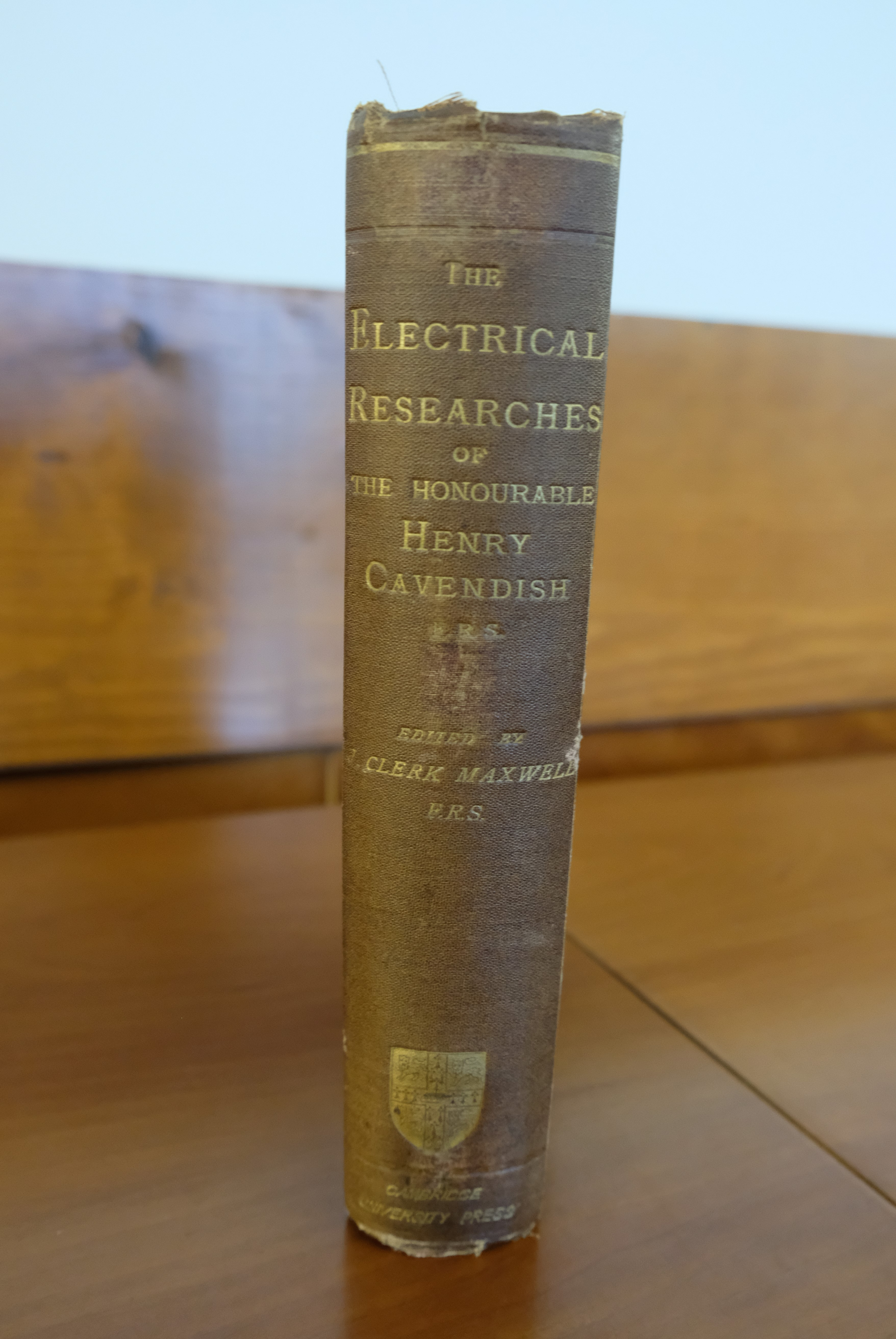
1879 copy of "The Electrical Researches of the Honourable Henry Cavendish F.R.S."

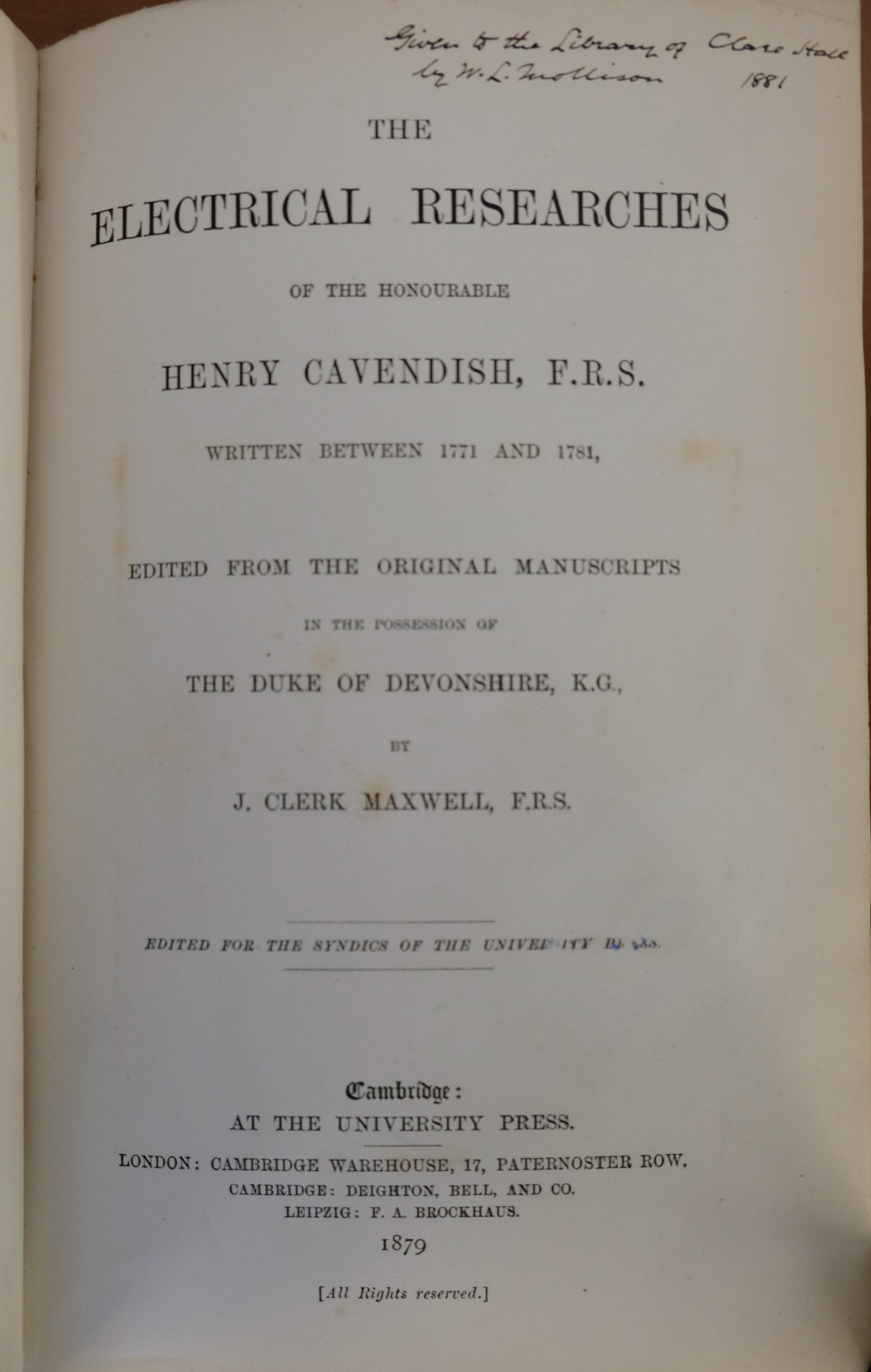
Title page of a 1879 copy of "The Electrical Researches of the Honourable Henry Cavendish F.R.S."

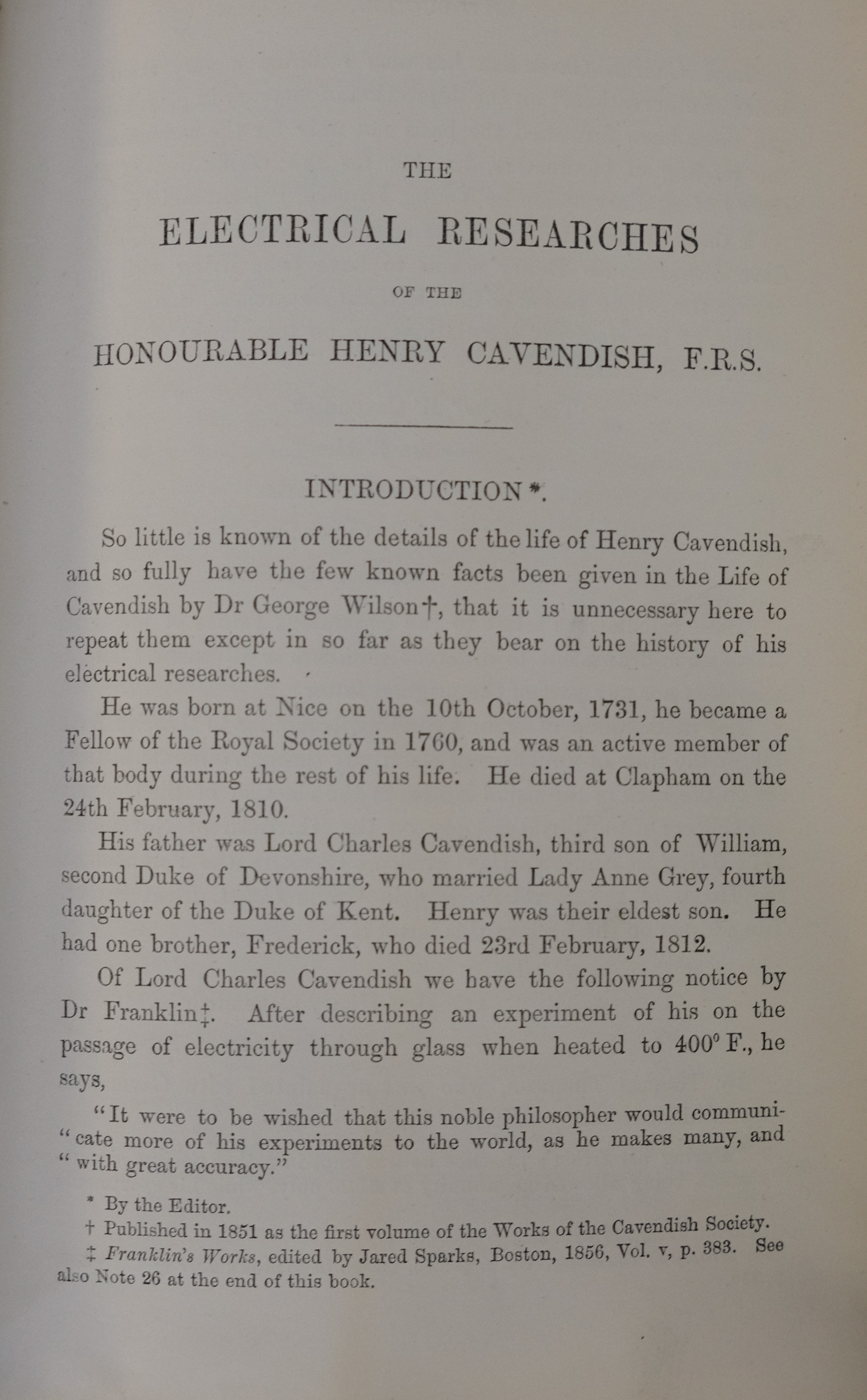
First page of a 1879 copy of "The Electrical Researches of the Honourable Henry Cavendish F.R.S."

== See also ==
- Timeline of hydrogen technologies
