= Torsion spring =

Type of spring

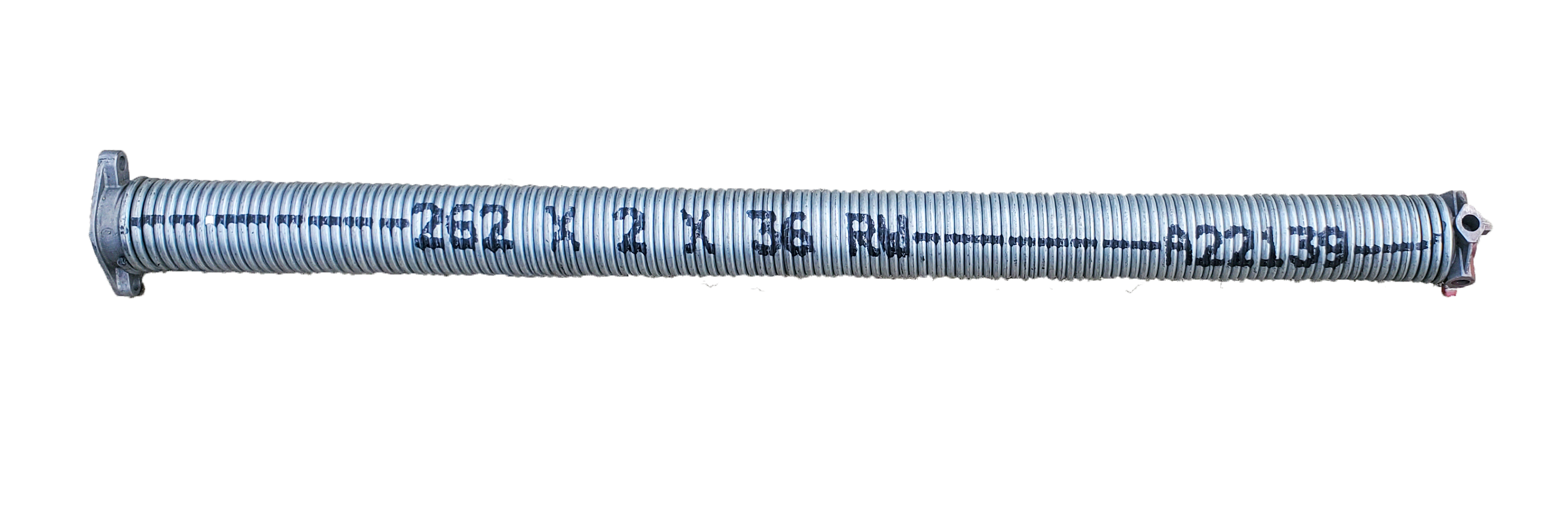
Garage door sectional torsion spring

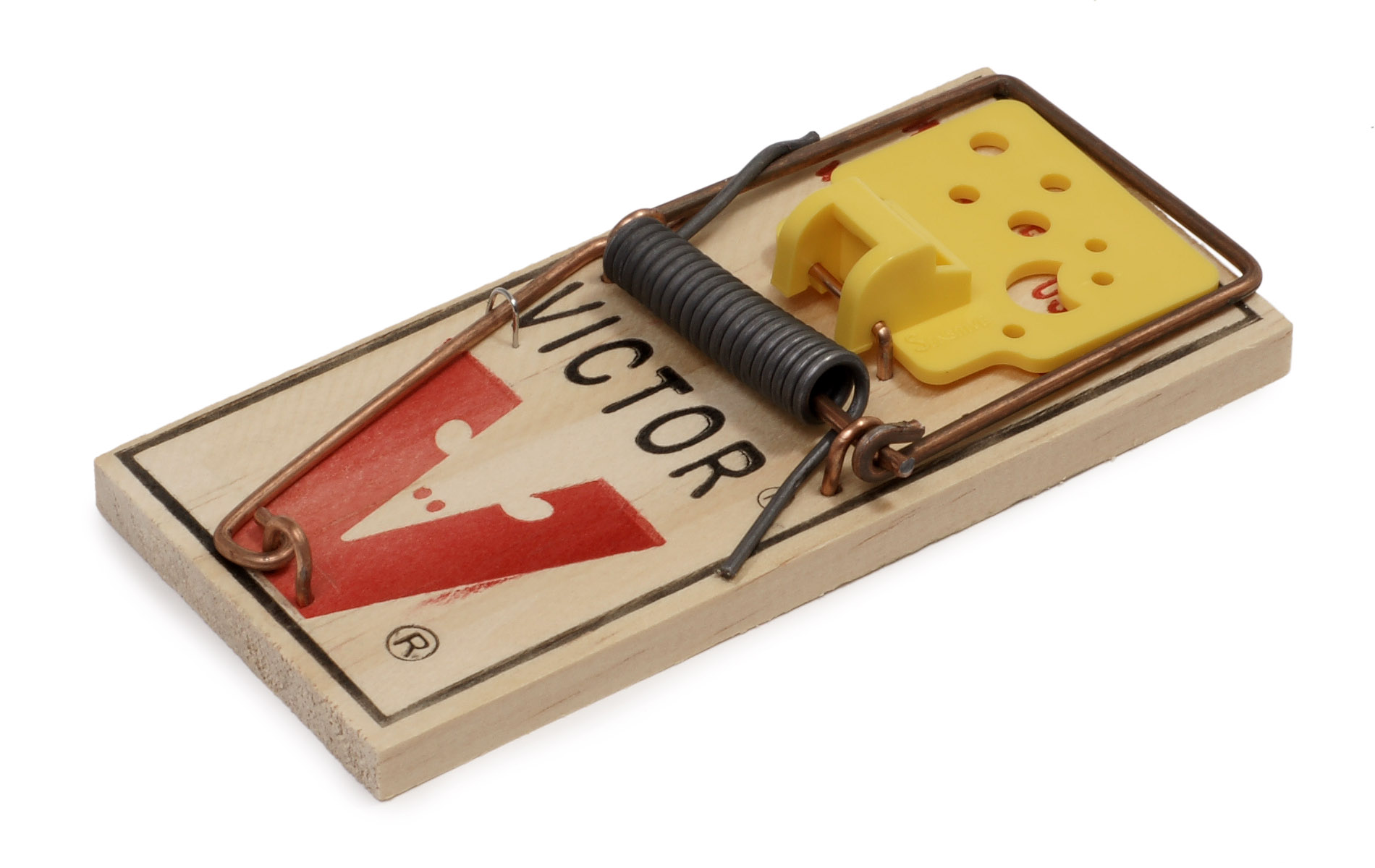
A mousetrap powered by a helical torsion spring

Video of a model torsion pendulum oscillating

A torsion spring is a spring that works by twisting its end along its axis; that is, a flexible elastic object that stores mechanical energy when it is twisted. When twisted, it exerts a torque in the opposite direction, proportional to the amount (measurable like an angle, but theoretically capable of exceeding 360° or 2π radians) it is twisted. There are various types:

- A torsion bar is a straight bar of metal or rubber that is subjected to twisting (shear stress) about its axis by torque applied at its ends.
- A more delicate form used in sensitive instruments, called a torsion fiber consists of a fiber of silk, glass, or quartz under tension, that is twisted about its axis.
- A helical torsion spring, is a metal rod or wire in the shape of a helix (coil) that is subjected to twisting about the axis of the coil by sideways forces (bending moments) applied to its ends, twisting the coil tighter.
- Clocks use a spiral wound torsion spring (a form of helical torsion spring where the coils are around each other instead of piled up) sometimes called a "clock spring" or colloquially called a mainspring. Those types of torsion springs are also used for attic stairs, clutches, typewriters and other devices that need near constant torque for large angles or even multiple revolutions.

== Torsion, bending ==
Torsion bars and torsion fibers do work by torsion. However, the terminology can be confusing because in a helical torsion spring (including a clock spring), the forces acting on the wire are actually bending stresses, not torsional (shear) stresses. A helical torsion spring actually works by torsion when it is bent (not twisted). We will use the word "torsion" in the following for a torsion spring according to the definition given above, whether the material it is made of actually works by torsion or by bending.

== Torsion coefficient ==
As long as they are not twisted beyond their elastic limit, torsion springs obey an angular form of Hooke's law:

$$\tau = -\kappa\theta\,$$

where

- $\tau\,$ is the torque exerted by the spring in newton-meters, and $\theta\,$ is the angle of twist from its equilibrium position in radians
- $\kappa\,$ is a constant with units of newton-meters / radian, variously called the spring's torsion coefficient, torsion elastic modulus, rate, or just spring constant, equal to the change in torque required to twist the spring through an angle of 1 radian.

The torsion constant may be calculated from the geometry and various material properties. It is analogous to the spring constant of a linear spring. The negative sign indicates that the direction of the torque is opposite to the direction of twist.

The energy U, in joules, stored in a torsion spring is:

$$U = \frac{1}{2}\kappa\theta^2$$

== Uses ==
Some familiar examples of uses are the strong, helical torsion springs that operate clothespins (clothespegs) and traditional spring-loaded-bar type mousetraps. Other uses are in the large, coiled torsion springs used to counterbalance the weight of garage doors, and a similar system is used to assist in opening the trunk (boot) cover on some sedans. Small, coiled torsion springs are often used to operate pop-up doors found on small consumer goods like digital cameras and compact disc players. Other more specific uses:

- A torsion bar suspension is a thick, steel torsion-bar spring attached to the body of a vehicle at one end and to a lever arm which attaches to the axle of the wheel at the other. It absorbs road shocks as the wheel goes over bumps and rough road surfaces, cushioning the ride for the passengers. Torsion-bar suspensions are used in many modern cars and trucks, as well as military vehicles.
- The sway bar (anti-roll bar) used in many vehicle suspension systems also uses the torsion spring principle.
- The torsion pendulum used in torsion pendulum clocks is a wheel-shaped weight suspended from its center by a wire torsion spring. The weight rotates about the axis of the spring, twisting it, instead of swinging like an ordinary pendulum. The force of the spring reverses the direction of rotation, so the wheel oscillates back and forth, driven at the top by the clock's gears.
- Torsion springs consisting of twisted ropes or sinew, were used to store potential energy to power several types of ancient weapons; including the Greek ballista and the Roman scorpio and catapults like the onager.
- The balance spring or hairspring in mechanical watches is a fine, spiral-shaped torsion spring that pushes the balance wheel back toward its center position as it rotates back and forth. The balance wheel and spring function similarly to the torsion pendulum above in keeping time for the watch.
- The D'Arsonval movement used in mechanical pointer-type meters to measure electric current is a type of torsion balance (see below). A coil of wire attached to the pointer twists in a magnetic field against the resistance of a torsion spring. Hooke's law ensures that the angle of the pointer is proportional to the current.
- A DMD or digital micromirror device chip is at the heart of many video projectors. It uses hundreds of thousands of tiny mirrors on tiny torsion springs fabricated on a silicon surface to reflect light onto the screen, forming the image.
- Badge tether

== Torsion balance ==
Drawing of Coulomb's torsion balance. From Plate 13 of his 1785 memoir.

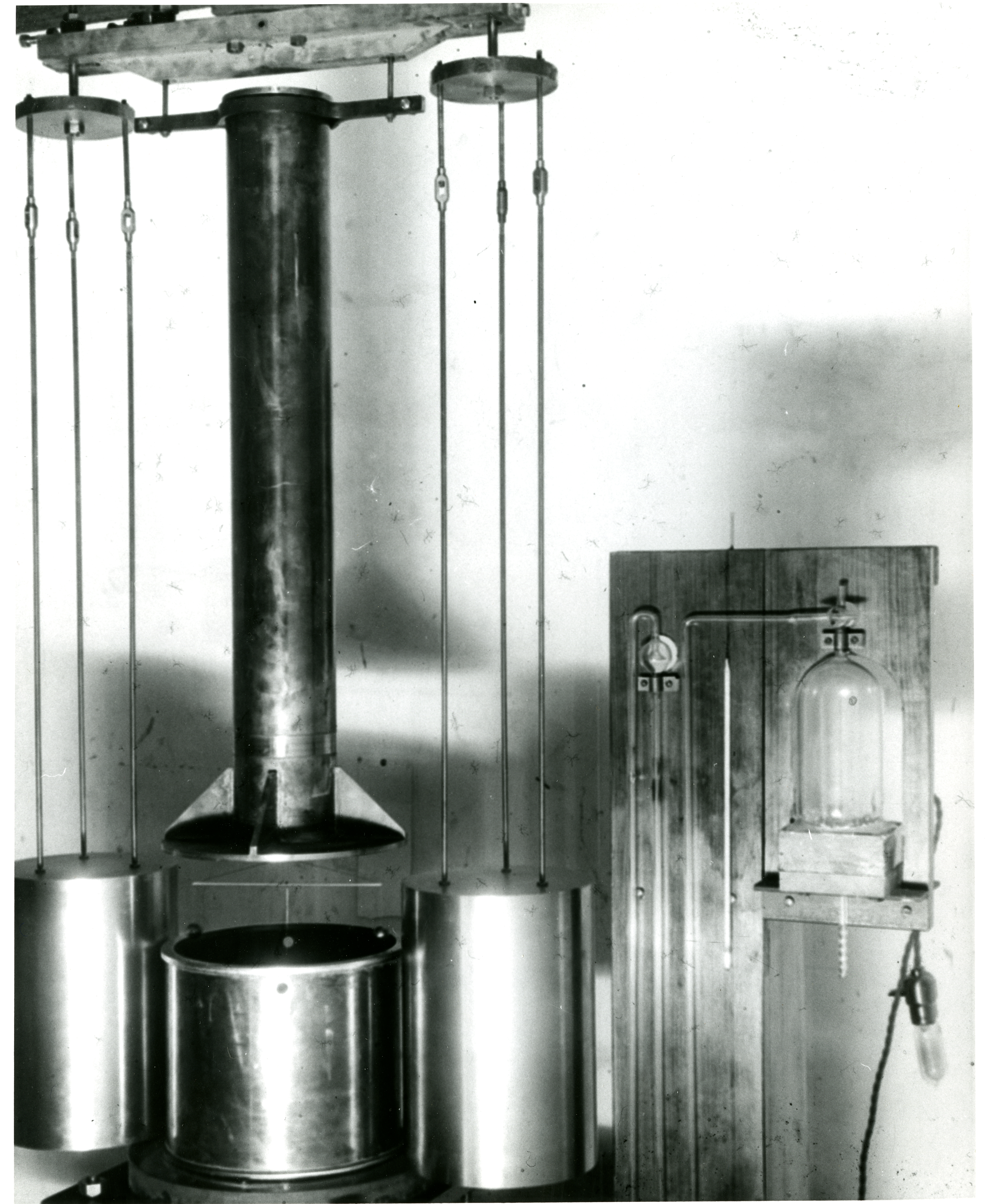
Torsion balance used by Paul R. Heyl in his measurements of the gravitational constant G at the U.S. National Bureau of Standards (now NIST) between 1930 and 1942.

The torsion balance, also called torsion pendulum, is a scientific apparatus for measuring very weak forces, usually credited to Charles-Augustin de Coulomb, who invented it in 1777, but independently invented by John Michell sometime before 1783. Its most well-known uses were by Coulomb to measure the electrostatic force between charges to establish Coulomb's law, and by Henry Cavendish in 1798 in the Cavendish experiment to measure the gravitational force between two masses to calculate the density of the Earth, leading later to a value for the gravitational constant.

The torsion balance consists of a bar suspended from its middle by a thin fiber. The fiber acts as a very weak torsion spring. If an unknown force is applied at right angles to the ends of the bar, the bar will rotate, twisting the fiber, until it reaches an equilibrium where the twisting force or torque of the fiber balances the applied force. Then the magnitude of the force is proportional to the angle of the bar. The sensitivity of the instrument comes from the weak spring constant of the fiber, so a very weak force causes a large rotation of the bar.

In Coulomb's experiment, the torsion balance was an insulating rod with a metal-coated ball attached to one end, suspended by a silk thread. The ball was charged with a known charge of static electricity, and a second charged ball of the same polarity was brought near it. The two charged balls repelled one another, twisting the fiber through a certain angle, which could be read from a scale on the instrument. By knowing how much force it took to twist the fiber through a given angle, Coulomb was able to calculate the force between the balls. Determining the force for different charges and different separations between the balls, he showed that it followed an inverse-square proportionality law, now known as Coulomb's law.

To measure the unknown force, the spring constant of the torsion fiber must first be known. This is difficult to measure directly because of the smallness of the force. Cavendish accomplished this by a method widely used since: measuring the resonant vibration period of the balance. If the free balance is twisted and released, it will oscillate slowly clockwise and counterclockwise as a harmonic oscillator, at a frequency that depends on the moment of inertia of the beam and the elasticity of the fiber. Since the inertia of the beam can be found from its mass, the spring constant can be calculated.

Coulomb first developed the theory of torsion fibers and the torsion balance in his 1785 memoir, Recherches theoriques et experimentales sur la force de torsion et sur l'elasticite des fils de metal &c. This led to its use in other scientific instruments, such as galvanometers, and the Nichols radiometer which measured the radiation pressure of light. In the early 1900s gravitational torsion balances were used in petroleum prospecting. Today torsion balances are still used in physics experiments. In 1987, gravity researcher A. H. Cook wrote:

The most important advance in experiments on gravitation and other delicate measurements was the introduction of the torsion balance by Michell and its use by Cavendish. It has been the basis of all the most significant experiments on gravitation ever since.

In the Eötvös experiment, a torsion balance was used to prove the equivalence principle - the idea that inertial mass and gravitational mass are one and the same.

== Torsional harmonic oscillators ==
Definition of terms
Term	Unit	Definition
$\theta\,$	rad	Angle of deflection from rest position
$I\,$	kg m^{2}	Moment of inertia
$C\,$	joule s rad^{−1}	Angular damping constant
$\kappa\,$	N m rad^{−1}	Torsion spring constant
$\tau\,$	$\mathrm{N\,m}\,$	Drive torque
$f_n\,$	Hz	Undamped (or natural) resonant frequency
$T_n\,$	s	Undamped (or natural) period of oscillation
$\omega_n\,$	$\mathrm{rad\,s^{-1}}\,$	Undamped resonant frequency in radians
$f\,$	Hz	Damped resonant frequency
$\omega\,$	$\mathrm{rad\,s^{-1}}\,$	Damped resonant frequency in radians
$\alpha\,$	$\mathrm{s^{-1}}\,$	Reciprocal of damping time constant
$\phi\,$	rad	Phase angle of oscillation
$L\,$	m	Distance from axis to where force is applied

Torsion balances, torsion pendulums and balance wheels are examples of torsional harmonic oscillators that can oscillate with a rotational motion about the axis of the torsion spring, clockwise and counterclockwise, in harmonic motion. Their behavior is analogous to translational spring-mass oscillators (see Harmonic oscillator Equivalent systems). The general differential equation of motion is:

$$I\frac{d^2\theta}{dt^2} + C\frac{d\theta}{dt} + \kappa\theta = \tau(t)$$

If the damping is small, $C \ll \sqrt{\kappa I}\,$, as is the case with torsion pendulums and balance wheels, the frequency of vibration is very near the natural resonant frequency of the system:

$$f_n = \frac{\omega_n}{2\pi} = \frac{1}{2\pi}\sqrt{\frac{\kappa}{I}}\,$$

Therefore, the period is represented by:

$$T_n = \frac{1}{f_n} = \frac{2\pi}{\omega_n} = 2\pi \sqrt{\frac{I}{\kappa}}\,$$

The general solution in the case of no drive force ($\tau = 0\,$), called the transient solution, is:

$$\theta = Ae^{-\alpha t} \cos{(\omega t + \phi)}\,$$

where:

$$\alpha = C/2I\,$$
$$\omega = \sqrt{\omega_n^2 - \alpha^2} =  \sqrt{\kappa/I - (C/2I)^2}\,$$

=== Applications ===
Animation of a torsion spring oscillating

The balance wheel of a mechanical watch is a harmonic oscillator whose resonant frequency $f_n\,$ sets the rate of the watch. The resonant frequency is regulated, first coarsely by adjusting $I\,$ with weight screws set radially into the rim of the wheel, and then more finely by adjusting $\kappa\,$ with a regulating lever that changes the length of the balance spring.

In a torsion balance the drive torque is constant and equal to the unknown force to be measured $F\,$, times the moment arm of the balance beam $L\,$, so $\tau(t) = FL\,$. When the oscillatory motion of the balance dies out, the deflection will be proportional to the force:

$$\theta = FL/\kappa\,$$

To determine $F\,$ it is necessary to find the torsion spring constant $\kappa\,$. If the damping is low, this can be obtained by measuring the natural resonant frequency of the balance, since the moment of inertia of the balance can usually be calculated from its geometry, so:

$$\kappa = (2\pi f_n)^2 I\,$$

In measuring instruments, such as the D'Arsonval ammeter movement, it is often desired that the oscillatory motion die out quickly so the steady state result can be read off. This is accomplished by adding damping to the system, often by attaching a vane that rotates in a fluid such as air or water (this is why magnetic compasses are filled with fluid). The value of damping that causes the oscillatory motion to settle quickest is called the critical damping$C_c\,$:

$$C_c = 2 \sqrt{\kappa I}\,$$

== See also ==
- Beam (structure)
- Slinky, helical toy spring

== Bibliography ==
- Gray, Andrew (1888), The Theory and Practice of Absolute Measurements in Electricity and Magnetism, Vol.1, Macmillan, pp. 254–260. Detailed account of Coulomb's experiment.
- Charles Augustin de Coulomb biography, Chemistry Dept., Hebrew Univ. of Jerusalem, archived from the original on 2009-08-06. Shows pictures of the Coulomb torsion balance, and describes Coulomb's contributions to torsion technology.
- Nichols, E.F.; Hull, G.F (June 1903), "The Pressure due to Radiation", The Astrophysical Journal, 17 (5): 315–351, Bibcode:1903ApJ....17..315N, doi:10.1086/141035. Describes the Nichols radiometer.
- Torsion balance, Virtual Geoscience Center, Society of Exploration Geophysicists, archived from the original on 2007-08-18. Description of how torsion balances were used in petroleum prospecting, with pictures of a 1902 instrument.
- "Charles Augustin de Coulomb", Encyclopædia Britannica, 9th Ed., vol. 6, Werner Co., 1907, p. 452
