= JG Thirlwell discography =

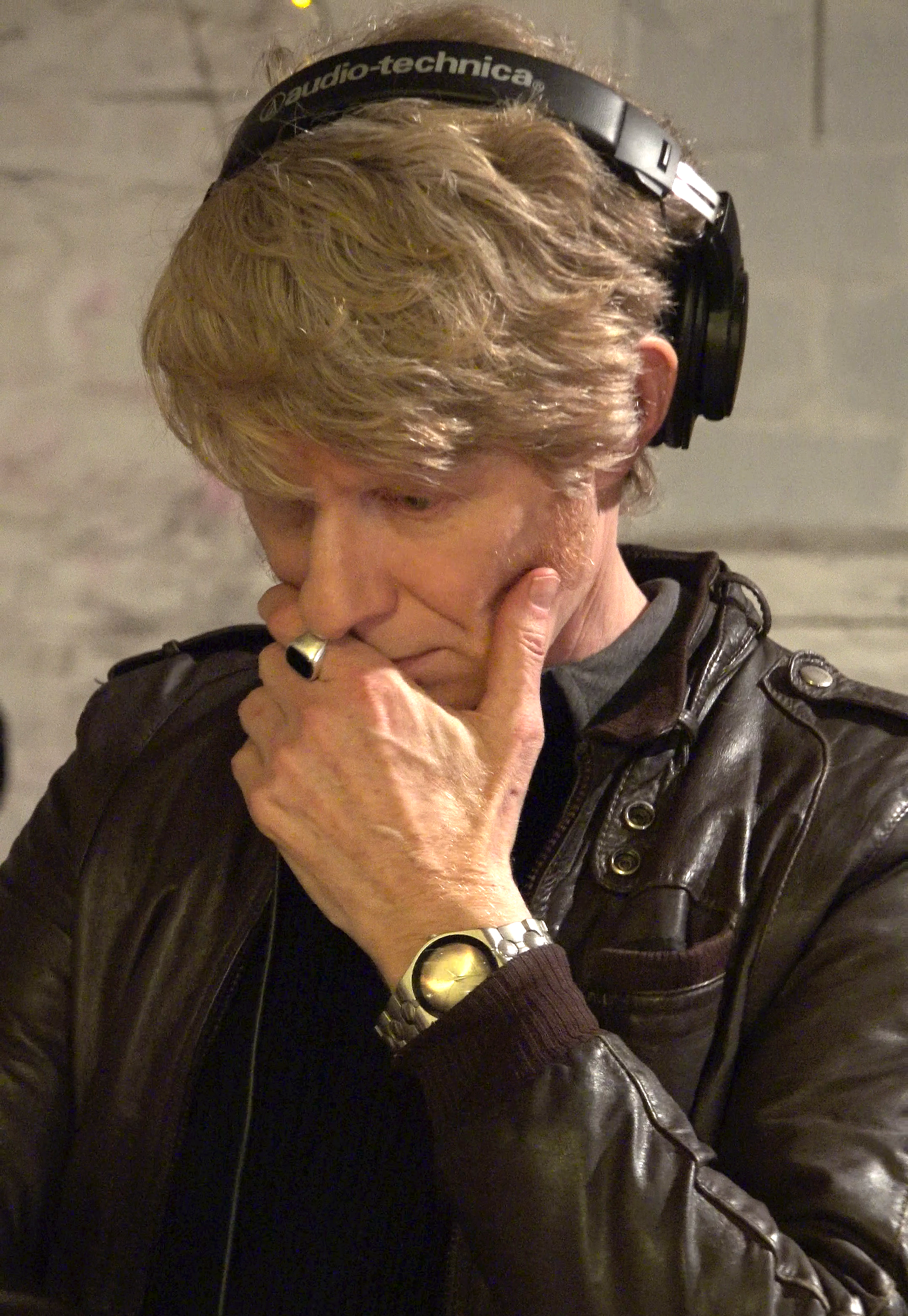
- Studio albums: 17
- EPs: 7
- Soundtrack albums: 2
- Live albums: 4
- Compilation albums: 3
- Singles: 9
- Remix albums: 2

This article details the complete work of an Australian-born composer and music producer JG Thirlwell, from his beginnings in 1980 to the present. It covers his output under multiple pseudonyms as well as his work as a collaborating artist and soundtrack composer.

== As a solo artist ==
=== As Foetus ===
==== Studio albums ====
| Title | Album details | UK Indie |
|---|---|---|
| Deaf | Released: September 1981 (UK); Label: Self Immolation; Formats: LP | — |
| Ache | Released: August 1982 (UK); Label: Self Immolation; Formats: LP | — |
| Hole | Released: September 1984 (UK); Label: PVC, Self Immolation, ZE; Formats: CD, CS, LP | 3 |
| Nail | Released: October 1985 (UK); Label: Homestead, Rough Trade, Self Immolation; Formats: CD, CS, LP | 1 |
| Thaw | Released: September 1988 (UK); Label: Rough Trade, Self Immolation; Formats: CD, LP | 3 |
| Gash | Released: 15 April 1995 (US); Label: Columbia; Formats: CD, CS | — |
| Flow | Released: 8 May 2001 (US); Label: Thirsty Ear; Formats: CD | — |
| Love | Released: 14 July 2005 (US); Label: Birdman, Ectopic Ents; Formats: CD | — |
| Hide | Released: 29 September 2010 (US); Label: Ectopic Ents; Formats: CD | — |
| Soak | Released: 15 October 2013 (US); Label: Ectopic Ents; Formats: CD | — |
| Halt | Released: 25 December 2025 (US); Label: Ectopic Ents; Formats: CD, LP | — |
"—" denotes a recording that did not chart or was not released in that territory.

==== Live albums ====
| Title | Album details |
|---|---|
| Rife | Released: 1988; Formats: CD, LP |
| Male | Released: 1992; Label: Thirsty Ear; Formats: CD, CS |
| Boil | Released: 20 August 1996; Label: Cleopatra; Formats: CD |
| York (First Exit to Brooklyn) | Released: 11 March 1997; Label: Thirsty Ear; Formats: CD |

==== Compilation albums ====
| Title | Album details |
|---|---|
| Sink | Released: October 1989; Label: Self Immolation, Some Bizzare, Wax Trax!; Formats: CD, CS, LP |
| Damp | Released: November 2006; Label: Ectopic Ents; Formats: CD |
| Limb | Released: May 2009; Label: Ectopic Ents; Formats: CD |

==== Remix albums ====
| Title | Album details |
|---|---|
| Blow | Released: 18 September 2001; Label: Thirsty Ear; Formats: CD |
| Vein | Released: October 2007; Label: Ectopic Ents; Formats: CD |

==== EPs ====
| Title | Album details | UK Indie |
|---|---|---|
| Custom Built for Capitalism | Released: 1982; Label: Self Immolation; Formats: LP | — |
| Bedrock | Released: April 1987; Label: Self Immolation, Some Bizzare, Wax Trax!; Formats: CS, LP | 2 |
| Ramrod | Released: 1988; Label: Self Immolation, Some Bizzare; Formats: LP | 5 |
| Butterfly Potion | Released: 1990; Label: Big Cat; Formats: CD, LP | — |
| Vice Squad Dick | Released: 1994; Label: PCP Entertainment; Formats: CD, LP | — |
| Null | Released: 1995; Label: Big Cat, Columbia; Formats: CD | — |
| (not adam) | Released: 2004; Label: Birdman, Ectopic Ents; Formats: CD | — |
"—" denotes a recording that did not chart or was not released in that territory.

==== Singles ====
| Title | Year | UK Indie | Album |
|---|---|---|---|
| "Spite Your Face"/"O.K.F.M." | 1981 | — | Non-album singles |
| "Wash It All Off!"/"333" | 1981 | — | Non-album singles |
| "Tell Me, What Is the Bane of Your Life" | 1982 | 30 | Non-album singles |
| "Calamity Crush"/"Catastrophe Crunch" | 1984 | 4 | Non-album singles |
| "Wash"/"Slog" | 1984 | 5 | Non-album singles |
| "Finely Honed Machine"/"Sick Minutes" | 1984 | 5 | Non-album singles |
| "Somnambulumdrum" | 1990 | — | Non-album singles |
| "Verklemmt" | 1995 | — | Gash |
| "Überschall" | 1996 | — | Non-album single |
"—" denotes a recording that did not chart or was not released in that territory.

==== Music videos ====
- "Need Machine"
- "Verklemmt" (1995)
- "Here Comes the Rain" (2010)

=== As Steroid Maximus ===
| Released | | Title |
| Year | Month | Title |
|---|---|---|
| 1991 | – | ¡Quilombo! |
| 1992 | – | Gondwanaland |
| 2002 | May | Ectopia |

=== As Manorexia ===
| Released | | Title |
| Year | Month | Title |
|---|---|---|
| 2001 | Jun | Volvox Turbo |
| 2002 | Oct | The Radiolarian Ooze |
| 2010 | Mar | The Mesopelagic Waters |
| 2011 | May | Dinoflagellate Blooms |

=== As JG Thirlwell ===
| Released | | Title |
| Year | Month | Title |
|---|---|---|
| 2009 | Mar | The Venture Bros.: The Music of JG Thirlwell |
| 2013 | Oct | The Blue Eyes |
| 2016 | Jun | The Music of The Venture Bros: Volume Two |

== Collaborative albums ==
=== With Wiseblood ===
==== Studio albums ====
| Title | Album details | UK Indie |
|---|---|---|
| Dirtdish | Released: 1987; Label: K.422; Formats: CD, CS, LP | 1 |
"—" denotes a recording that did not chart or was not released in that territory.

==== Singles ====
| Title | Year | UK Indie | Album |
|---|---|---|---|
| "Motorslug"/"Death Rape 2000" | 1985 | 3 | Non-album singles |
| "Stumbo"/"Someone Drowned in My Pool" | 1986 | 4 | Non-album singles |
| "P T T M" | 1991 | — | Non-album singles |
"—" denotes a recording that did not chart or was not released in that territory.

=== With Flesh Volcano ===
| Title | Album details | UK Indie |
|---|---|---|
| Slut | Released: 1987; Label: Some Bizzare; Formats: LP | 12 |
"—" denotes a recording that did not chart or was not released in that territory.

=== With Lydia Lunch ===
| Title | Album details | UK Indie |
|---|---|---|
| Stinkfist | Released: 1988; Label: Widowspeak; Formats: LP | 18 |
| Don't Fear the Reaper | Released: 1991; Label: Big Cat; Formats: CD, LP | — |
"—" denotes a recording that did not chart or was not released in that territory.

== Credits ==
=== Performance credits ===
| Year | Artist | Release | Role(s) | Song(s) |
|---|---|---|---|---|
| 1981 | Nurse with Wound | Insect and Individual Silenced | Bass amp, jack plugs | "Alvin's Funeral (The Milk Was Delivered in Black Bottles)" |
| 1983 | Marc and the Mambas | Torment and Toreros | Instruments | "A Million Manias" |
| 1983 | Marc and the Mambas | Torment and Toreros | Drums | "Beat out that Rhythm on a Drum" |
| 1983 | The The | Soul Mining | Percussion | "Giant" |
| 1984 | Coil | Scatology | Sampler | "Panic" |
| 1984 | Nurse with Wound | Brained by Falling Masonry | Vocals | "Brained by Falling Masonry" |
| 1984 | Nurse with Wound/Current 93 | Nylon Coverin' Body Smotherin' | Vocals | "Brained by Falling Masonry" |
| 1984 | Orange Juice | The Orange Juice | Piano | "Salmon Fishing in New York" |
| 1984 | Nick Cave and the Bad Seeds | From Her to Eternity | unknown instruments during early recording sessions, uncredited | |
| 1985 | Annie Hogan | Plays Kickabye | Percussion | "Burning Boats" |
| 1985 | Nurse with Wound | The Sylvie and Babs Hi-Fi Companion | Instruments | — |
| 1986 | Coil | Horse Rotorvator | Sampler | "Circles of Mania" |
| 1986 | Virgin Prunes | The Moon Looked Down and Laughed | Instruments | — |
| 1987 | Coil | Gold Is the Metal with the Broadest Shoulders | Instruments | "The Broken Wheel", "The Wheal" |
| 1987 | Lydia Lunch | Honeymoon in Red | Treatments | "Still Burning", "Fields of Fire", "Three Kings" |
| 1988 | PIG | A Poke in the Eye... with a Sharp Stick | Instruments | "Peoria" |
| 1989 | PIG | Sick City | Instruments, additional vocals | "Sick City" |
| 1990 | Gumball | Gumball | Backing vocals | "Yellow Pants" |
| 1990 | Nurse with Wound | Psilotripitaka | Instruments | "Duelling Banjos", "Registered Nurse Second Coming" |
| 1991 | Boss Hog | Action Box | Vocals | "Black Throat" |
| 1991 | Jarboe | Thirteen Masks | Sampler, programming | "Red" |
| 1991 | Lydia Lunch | Twisted/Past Glas | Instruments, tapes | — |
| 1992 | Of Cabbages and Kings | Hunter's Moon | Vocals | "Faucet" |
| 1992 | Silverfish | Organ Fan | Brass, additional vocals | "Fucking Strange Way to Get Attention" |
| 1992 | Sovetskoe Foto | The Humidity | Vocals | "Forget" |
| 1993 | Boss Hog | Girl + | Vocals | "Not Guilty" |
| 1993 | Workdogs | Workdogs in Hell | Instruments | "Eulogy Regrets", "*" |
| 1994 | PIG & Sow | Je M'Aime | Instruments | "Blood Sucking Bitch" |
| 1995 | Argyle Park | Misguided | Spoken word | "Refuge" |
| 1995 | Ann Magnuson | The Luv Show | Spoken word | "Sex With the Devil" |
| 1995 | Voivod | Negatron | Sampler | "D.N.A. (Don't No Anything)" |
| 2000 | Melvins | The Crybaby | Vocals, sampler | "Mine Is No Disgrace" |
| 2003 | Rotoskop | Revolution: Lost | Vocals | "Mary Magdalene", "Paging Dr. Strong" |
| 2004 | Atsushi Sakurai | Ai no Wakusei | All instruments and backing vocals | "I Hate You All" |
| 2005 | Jarboe | The Men Album | Vocals | "Bass Force/Angel Jim" (Low Rider mix) |
| 2007 | Strings of Consciousness | Our Moon Is Full | Vocals | "Asphodel" |
| 2011 | Hypnoz | A Score for Iron Blues | Vocals | "Night on Earth" |
| 2011 | International Moods | Frequent Traveller | Vocals | "Landing Time", "Don't Leave Home Without It" |
| 2012 | Cisfinitum & First Human Ferro | Alchemicals | Voice | "New Cleansed Order" |
| 2013 | Melvins | Everybody Loves Sausages | Vocals | "Station to Station" |
| 2014 | Elysian Fields | For House Cats And Sea Fans | Sampler | "Escape From New York" |
"—" denotes a credit for the entire release.

=== Production and mixing credits ===
| Year | Artist | Release | Role(s) | Song(s) |
|---|---|---|---|---|
| 1984 | Coil | Scatology | Producer | — |
| 1984 | Einstürzende Neubauten | Strategies Against Architecture '80–'83 | Producer | — |
| 1984 | Sonic Youth | Death Valley '69 | Co-producer, engineering | — |
| 1984 | Swans | Cop | Engineering | — |
| 1985 | Fur Bible | Fur Bible | Producer | — |
| 1985 | Annie Hogan | Plays Kickabye | Producer | "Burning Boats" |
| 1985 | Lydia Lunch and Lucy Hamilton | The Drowning of Lucy Hamilton | Engineering, mixing | "Emerald Pale Has Disappeared", "The Drowning", "How Men Die in Their Sleep" |
| 1985 | Lydia Lunch and Lucy Hamilton | The Drowning of Lucy Hamilton | Remastering | "Lucy's Lost Her Head Again", "3:20 Thursday Morning", "A Quiet Night of Murder in Greenwich, CT" |
| 1986 | Bewitched | Chocolate Frenzy | Mixing | — |
| 1987 | Lydia Lunch | Honeymoon in Red | Mixing | "Done Dun", "Dead in the Head, "Come Fall", "Dead River" |
| 1988 | Black Snakes | Crawl | Mixing | — |
| 1988 | PIG | A Poke in the Eye... with a Sharp Stick | Co-producer | "Peoria" |
| 1989 | Emilio Cubeiro | Death of an Asshole | Remastering | "It's All Desert Now" |
| 1989 | PIG | Sick City | Producer | "Sick City" |
| 1990 | Lydia Lunch | Conspiracy of Women | Remastering | — |
| 1991 | Boss Hog | Action Box | Producer, mixing | "Black Throat" |
| 1991 | The Beyond | Chasm | Producer | — |
| 1991 | Cop Shoot Cop | White Noise | Mixing | "Relief", "Empires Collapse", "Heads I Win, Tails You Lose", "Where's the Money", "Hung Again" |
| 1991 | EMF | Lies | Co-producer, mixing | "Lies" |
| 1991 | Jarboe | Thirteen Masks | Producer | "Red" |
| 1991 | Lydia Lunch | Queen of Siam | Remastering | — |
| 1991 | Lydia Lunch | Twisted/Past Glas | Recording, mixing | — |
| 1991 | Rowland S. Howard/Lydia Lunch | Shotgun Wedding | Producer | — |
| 1991 | Motherhead Bug | Raised by Insects...Bugview | Producer | "My Sweet Milstar" |
| 1991 | Swans | White Light from the Mouth of Infinity | Producer | "Power and Sacrifice" |
| 1992 | Malaria! | Elation | Producer | — |
| 1992 | Silverfish | Organ Fan | Producer | — |
| 1993 | Boss Hog | Girl + | Producer | "Not Guilty" |
| 1993 | Cranes | Clear | Co-producer | — |
| 1996 | Halcion | Lemongrass | Co-producer | "Lemongrass" |
| 1996 | Halcion | Lemongrass | Mixing | "Goldfever" |
| 1996 | Mars | 78+ | Remastering | — |
| 1998 | D.I.E. | Fragyro | Engineering | "Fragile" (Dragonnade mix) |
| 1999 | The Birthday Party | Live 1981–82 | Remastering | — |
| 2000 | Boss Hog | Whiteout | Mixing | "Jaguar" |
| 2000 | Melvins | The Crybaby | Recording, mixing | "Mine Is No Disgrace" |
| 2003 | Rotoskop | Revolution: Lost | Recording | "Mary Magdalene" |
| 2005 | Boss Hog | Whiteout | Mixing | "Jaguar" |
| 2005 | Alexander Hacke | Sanctuary | Mixing | "Per Sempre Butterfly" |
| 2009 | Excepter | FRKWYS Vol. 2 | Co-producer | "Stretch" (JG Thirlwell mix) |
| 2013 | Zola Jesus | Versions | Co-producer | "Fall Back", "Night", "In Your Nature" |
"—" denotes a credit for the entire release.

=== Remixing credits ===
| Year | Artist | Release | Song(s) |
|---|---|---|---|
| 1985 | Don King | One-Two Punch | "Revelry" (King Size mix) |
| 1989 | Nurse with Wound | Gyllenskold/Brained | "Brained by Falling Masonry" |
| 1989 | PIG | Sick City | "Shit for Brains" (JG Thirlwell mix) |
| 1991 | The Beyond | Empire/One Step Too Far | "One Step Too Far" (Brain Surgery mix), "Empire" (Radiation Cocktail mix) |
| 1991 | EMF | I Believe | "I Believe" (Colt 45 mix), "I Believe" (Inframental mix) |
| 1991 | EMF | Lies | "Lies" (Megastress mix), "Lies" (Jonestown mix), "Lies" (Prozac mix) |
| 1991 | Lydia Lunch | Queen of Siam | — |
| 1991 | Murder, Inc. | Corpuscle | "Murder Inc." (Busted Corpuscle mix), "Mania" (7" mix), "Mania" (Righteous mix) |
| 1992 | Daniel Ash | Get Out of Control | "Get Out of Control" (Aortalesque mix), "Get Out of Control" (Prostated mix), "Get Out of Control" (Thyroidinal mix), "Get Out of Control" (Excemanemic mix) |
| 1992 | EMF | It's You | "Dog" (Frank's mix) |
| 1992 | Nine Inch Nails | Fixed | "Wish" (remix), "Fist Fuck" |
| 1992 | Prong | Prove You Wrong | "Prove You Wrong" (Fuzzbuster mix) |
| 1992 | Red Hot Chili Peppers | Higher Ground/If You Want Me to Stay | "Higher Ground" (Freckle Nose mix) |
| 1992 | The The | Dogs of Lust | "Dogs of Lust" (Spermicide mix), "Dogs of Lust" (Germicide mix), "Dogs of Lust" (Squirmicide mix) |
| 1993 | Cranes | Clear | "Clear" (Boll-Weevil mix), "Clear" (Davidian Memorial mix), "Clear" (Blue Gills mix) |
| 1993 | The Cult | Sanctuary MCMXCIII | "She Sells Sanctuary" (Slutnostic mix) |
| 1993 | Ethyl Meatplow | Ripened Peach | "Ripened Peach" (Deep Fried mix), "Ripened Peach" (Burnt to a Crisp mix) |
| 1993 | Fight | Nailed to the Gun | "Nailed to the Gun" (Bulletproof mix) |
| 1993 | Front 242 | Religion | "Religion" (Lovelace a Go-Go mix), "Religion" (Pussy Whipped mix) |
| 1993 | Pantera | Walk | "Walk" (Cervical mix) |
| 1995 | Nine Inch Nails | Further Down the Spiral | "Self Destruction, Part Two", "Self Destruction, Part Three", "Self Destruction, Final" |
| 1995 | Pop Will Eat Itself | Two Fingers My Friends! | "Kick 2 Kill" (Seersucker mix) |
| 1996 | Danzig | Sacrifice | "Sacrifice" (Rust mix), "Sacrifice" (Trust mix), "Sacrifice" (Must mix), "Sacrifice" (Crust mix) |
| 1996 | Marilyn Manson | The Beautiful People | "The Not So Beautiful People" |
| 1996 | Congo Norvell | The Dope, the Lies, the Vaseline | "You Can Lay With Dogs" |
| 1997 | Skeleton Key | Fantastic Spikes Through Balloon | "Nod Off" (remix) |
| 1998 | D.I.E. | Fragyro | "Fragile" (Dragonnade mix) |
| 1999 | The Birthday Party | Live 1981–82 | — |
| 2000 | Jon Spencer Blues Explosion | Lap Dance | "Lap Dance" (JG Thirlwell mix) |
| 2002 | Norscq | Lavatron.X | "WaG" (Proselyte mix) |
| 2005 | End | The Sick Generation | "The Sick Generation" (El Lubo mix) |
| 2008 | Current 93 | Black Ships Heat the Dancefloor | "Black Ships Ate the Sky I & II" (remix) |
| 2009 | Excepter | FRKWYS Vol. 2 | "Stretch" (JG Thirlwell mix) |
| 2010 | Extra Life | Splayed Flesh | "The Body Is True" (remix) |
| 2010 | Zs | New Slaves++ | "New Slaves" (remix) |
| 2014 | CoH | To Beat or not to Beat | "Bond Number" (JG Thirlwell mix) |
| 2014 | Faith No More | Motherfucker | "Motherfucker" (JG Thirlwell remix) |
| 2015 | John Carpenter | Lost Themes | "Abyss" (JG Thirlwell mix) |
"—" denotes a credit for the entire release.

=== Composition credits ===
| Year | Artist | Release | Song(s) |
|---|---|---|---|
| 1983 | Marc and the Mambas | Torment and Toreros | "A Million Manias" |
| 1984 | Nick Cave and the Bad Seeds | From Her to Eternity | "Wings Off Flies" |
| 1984 | Coil | Scatology | "Panic" |
| 1984 | Orange Juice | Texas Fever | "Craziest Feeling" |
| 1987 | Lydia Lunch | Honeymoon in Red | "So Your Heart" |
| 1988 | PIG | A Poke in the Eye... with a Sharp Stick | "Peoria" |
| 1989 | Emilio Cubeiro | Death of an Asshole | "It's All Desert Now" |
| 1991 | Boss Hog | Action Box | "Black Throat" |
| 1991 | Cop Shoot Cop | White Noise | "Corporate Protopop" |
| 1991 | Lydia Lunch | Twisted/Past Glas | — |
| 1992 | Of Cabbages and Kings | Hunter's Moon | "Faucet" |
| 1992 | Silverfish | Organ Fan | "Fucking Strange Way to Get Attention" |
| 1992 | Sovetskoe Foto | The Humidity | "Forget" |
| 1993 | Boss Hog | Girl + | "Not Guilty" |
| 1994 | PIG & Sow | Je M'Aime | "Blood Sucking Bitch" |
| 1995 | Voivod | Negatron | "D.N.A. (Don't No Anything)" |
| 2000 | Melvins | The Crybaby | "Mine Is No Disgrace" |
| 2003 | Rotoskop | Revolution: Lost | "Mary Magdalene", "Paging Dr. Strong" |
| 2006 | Bunny Lake | The Late Night Tapes | "Nightwalker", "Nightwalker Part II" |
| 2007 | Strings of Consciousness | Our Moon Is Full | "Asphodel" |
| 2011 | International Moods | Frequent Traveller | "Landing Time", "Don't Leave Home Without It" |
"—" denotes a credit for the entire release.
