= Self Immolation (record label) =

Australian independent record label

Self Immolation is a record label and publishing company run by J. G. Thirlwell. Originally an actual label for Thirlwell's self-released early Foetus EPs and albums, Self Immolation became more akin to a vanity label for Thirlwell's releases on Some Bizzare Records and Wax Trax! Records. Most Self Immolation releases are identified by a call number beginning with a Foetal-inspired "WOMB" designator.

Beginning in the early 1990s, Thirlwell began a second personal label, Ectopic Entertainment (often shortened to Ectopic Ents). Its exact relation to Self Immolation is unclear: initially called a "subsidiary" of Self Immolation, it appears to have later wholly replaced Self Immolation. Coming full circle, Thirlwell's self-released Manorexia project is released on Ectopic Ents.

== Self Immolation releases ==
- WOMB S201 : Foetus Under Glass – Spite Your Face/OKFM
- WOMB ALL 007 : You've Got Foetus on Your Breath – Wash It All Off
- WOMB OYBL 1 : You've Got Foetus on Your Breath – Deaf
- WOMB KX07 : Phillip And His Foetus Vibrations – Tell Me, What Is the Bane of Your Life
- WOMB WSUSC 12.5 : Foetus Over Frisco – Custom Built for Capitalism
- WOMB OYBL 2 : You've Got Foetus on Your Breath – Ache
- WOMB FDL 3 : Scraping Foetus Off The Wheel – Hole
- WOMB FAT 11.12 : Foetus Art Terrorism – Calamity Crush
- WOMB FGH 12.8 : You've Got Foetus on Your Breath – Wash/Slog
- WOMB UNC 7.12 : Foetus Über Frisco – Finely Honed Machine
- FOE 1 : The Foetus of Excellence – The Foetus of Excellence
- WOMB FIP 4 : Scraping Foetus Off The Wheel – Nail
- WOMB FAN 13 : The Foetus All-Nude Revue – Bedrock
- WOMB PIG 12.12 : Scraping Foetus Off The Wheel – Ramrod
- WOMB FIP 5 : Foetus Interruptus – Thaw
- RIFLE 1 : Foetus Corruptus – Rife
- WOMB INC 6 : Foetus Inc – Sink
- WOMB FLY 18T : Foetus Inc – Butterfly Potion
- WOMB FLEX 1 : Foetus Inc – Somnambulumdrum

=== Non-Existent releases ===
- WOMB 6T33 : Foetus on the Beach. Often mentioned in press releases, this triple-LP set was never issued.

== Ectopic Ents releases ==
- ECT ENTS 001 : ???
- ECT ENTS 002 : Steroid Maximus – ¡Quilombo!
- ECT ENTS 003 : Steroid Maximus – Gondwanaland
- ECT ENTS 004 : ???
- ECT ENTS 005 : Foetus in Excelsis Corruptus Deluxe – Male
- ECT ENTS 006 : ???
- ECT ENTS 007 : ???
- ECT ENTS 008 : Foetus - Gash
- ECT ENTS 009 : Foetus – Null disc of Null/Void
- ECT ENTS 010 : Foetus – Void disc of Null/Void
- ECT ENTS 011 : ???
- ECT ENTS 012 : You've Got Foetus on Your Breath – Deaf reissue (Thirsty Ear CD)
- ECT ENTS 013 : You've Got Foetus on Your Breath – Ache reissue (Thirsty Ear CD)
- ECT ENTS 014 : ???
- ECT ENTS 015 : ???
- ECT ENTS 016 : ???
- ECT ENTS 017 : ???
- ECT ENTS 018 : ???
- ECT ENTS 019 : ???
- ECT ENTS 020 : Foetus - Flow
- ECT ENTS 021 : Manorexia – Volvox Turbo
- ECT ENTS 022 : Foetus - Blow
- ECT ENTS 023 : Steroid Maximus – Ectopia
- ECT ENTS 024 : Manorexia – The Radiolarian Ooze
- ECT ENTS 025 : ???
- ECT ENTS 026 : Foetus – (not adam)
- ECT ENTS 027 : Foetus – Love
- ECT ENTS 028 : Foetus – Damp
- ECT ENTS 029 : Foetus – Vein
- ECT ENTS 030 : Foetus – Limb
- ECT ENTS 031 : The Venture Bros.: The Music of JG Thirlwell (released by Williams Street Records, designation used for sale at Ectopic's online shop)
- ECT ENTS 032 : Manorexia – The Mesopelagic Waters
- ECT ENTS 033: Foetus – Hide
- ECT ENTS 034: Manorexia – Dinoflagellate Blooms
- ECT ENTS 035: Foetus – Soak
- ECT ENTS 036: J. G. Thirlwell – The Blue Eyes – Original Soundtrack
- ECT ENTS 037: J. G. Thirlwell – The Venture Bros. Vol. 2
- ECT ENTS 038: J. G. Thirlwell – Imponderable – Original Soundtrack
- ECT ENTS 039: Xordox – Neospection
- ECT ENTS 040: J. G. Thirlwell and Simon Steensland: Oscillospira
- ECT ENTS 041: ???
- ECT ENTS 042: ???
- ECT ENTS 043: ???
- ECT ENTS 044: Xordox – Terraform
- ECT ENTS 045: JG Thirlwell – The Venture Bros. Vol. 3
- ECT ENTS 046: Foetus – Halt

== See also ==
- List of record labels
