= Male (Foetus album) =

Live album by Foetus
- Released: 1992
- Recorded: November 3, 1990
- Venue: CBGB (New York City)
- Genre: Industrial
- Length: 100:07
- Label: Thirsty Ear
- Producer: J. G. Thirlwell

J. G. Thirlwell chronology
¡Quilombo! (1991)	Male (1992)	Gondwanaland (1992)

Professional ratings
Review scores
Source	Rating
AllMusic	4/5 stars
AllMusic	(Film:)

Male is a live album by Foetus in Excelsis Corruptus Deluxe. It records the Foetus live performance of November 3, 1990, in Manhattan's famed CBGB nightclub. A film of this performance, also titled Male, was also released.

Though there is no indication on the album itself, the discography included with the Sink reissue identifies Male as Ectopic Ents #ECT ENTS 005.

== Track listing ==
All tracks are written by J. G. Thirlwell, except where noted.

Disc one
No.	Title	Writer(s)	Length
1.	"Free James Brown"		4:36
2.	"Fin"		1:56
3.	"Hot Horse"		5:08
4.	"English Faggot"		6:25
5.	"Faith Healer"	Alex Harvey, Hugh McKenna	7:20
6.	"Honey I'm Home"	Roli Mosimann, J. G. Thirlwell	9:25
7.	"Butterfly Potion"		3:09
8.	"I'll Meet You in Poland Baby"		7:43

Disc two
No.	Title	Writer(s)	Length
1.	"Anything (Viva!)"		8:41
2.	"Death Rape 2000"		1:59
3.	"Puppet Dude"	Jim Dunbar, Don Fleming, Elton John, Jay Spiegel, J. G. Thirlwell	4:56
4.	"Stumbo"	Roli Mosimann, J. G. Thirlwell	7:55
5.	"Someone Drowned in My Pool"		9:25
6.	"Behemoth"	TAD	8:05
7.	"Your Salvation"		14:24

Song details

- "Death Rape 2000," "Stumbo," and "Someone Drowned in My Pool" originally by Thirlwell's Wiseblood project.
- "Faith Healer" is a cover of The Sensational Alex Harvey Band.
- "Behemoth" is a cover of TAD.
- "Puppet Dude" is a reworked cover of Elton John's "Rocket Man."
- The lyrics for "English Faggot" were inspired from a threatening answering machine message left for bandleader JG Thirlwell, who is Australian and not English.

== Personnel ==
- Clint Ruin - vocals
- Algis Kizys - bass
- David Ouimet - samplers, trombone
- Norman Westberg - guitar
- Hahn Rowe - violin, guitar
- Vinnie Signorelli - drums

== Production ==
- J. G. Thirlwell - production, execution
- Mark Ohe - execution
- Martin Bisi - mixing engineer, mastering

== Concert film ==
DVD

In 1993, a year after the album hit stores, the Male performance was released as concert film on VHS by Self Immolation/Atavistic. Instead of a straight video of the concert, the Male film applies simple video effects to the raw footage. A DVD version of the film was released by Music Video Distributions in 2003.

=== Film track listing ===
1. "Free James Brown"
2. "Fin"
3. "Hot Horse"
4. "English Faggot"
5. "Faith Healer"
6. "Honey I'm Home"
7. "Butterfly Potion"
8. "I'll Meet You in Poland Baby"
9. "Anything (Viva!)"
10. "Death Rape 2000"
11. "Stumbo"
12. "Behemoth"
13. "Your Salvation"
