= Limb (album) =

Compilation album by Foetus
- Released: May 15, 2009
- Recorded: 1980–1983
- Genres: Industrial, experimental rock
- Length: 71:59 (Limb); 1:59:36 (NYC Foetus)
- Label: Ectopic Ents
- Producer: J. G. Thirlwell

Foetus chronology
| Vein (2007) | Limb (2009) | Hide (2010) |

J. G. Thirlwell chronology
| The Venture Bros.: The Music of JG Thirlwell (2009) | Limb (2009) | The Mesopelagic Waters (2010) |

Limb is a Foetus compilation album, released on May 15, 2009 by Ectopic Ents. Limb collects out-of-print and previously unreleased instrumental tracks from the early days of Foetus (Thirlwell's instrumental tracks would later be released under the names Steroid Maximus and Manorexia). Limb is packaged with a DVD featuring Clément Tuffreau's NYC Foetus documentary about Thirlwell's life in New York City, along with several live performances of Thirlwell's ensembles and commissioned music.

== Music ==
Many of the pieces on Limb are influenced by minimalist composers, with Thirlwell citing John Cage, Steve Reich (particularly his phasing technique) and Terry Riley in the liner notes. A 20-minute phase piece titled "You Have to Obey", comprising a looped Vincent Price sample, is included as a bonus track in audio MP3.

== Artwork ==
In keeping with Limb's minimalist theme, the album comes packaged with a book of minimalist art in Thirlwell's "signature color palette of red, white, black and gray." The pieces are in the styles of individual artists including Joan Miró, Bridget Riley and Wassily Kandinsky and art movements like Constructivism.

== Track listing ==
All tracks are written by J. G. Thirlwell.

| No. | Title | Length |
|---|---|---|
| 1. | "Sick Minutes" (from Finely Honed Machine) | 8:39 |
| 2. | "Ezekiel's Wheels" | 1:38 |
| 3. | "Te Deum" (from Bethel compilation) | 4:50 |
| 4. | "The Anxious Figure" | 4:03 |
| 5. | "Primordial Industry" (from An Afflicted Man's Musica Box compilation) | 6:12 |
| 6. | "Industrial Go-Slow" (from An Afflicted Man's Musica Box compilation) | 3:37 |
| 7. | "That We Forbid" | 2:49 |
| 8. | "Sjogren's Syndrome" | 7:17 |
| 9. | "Echolation" | 1:22 |
| 10. | "TO 45 Tag" (edited from Custom Built for Capitalism) | 1:37 |
| 11. | "Piano Piece" (from Bethel compilation) | 4:03 |
| 12. | "The Caterpillar Kid" | 5:52 |
| 13. | "You Have to Obey" (CD bonus track) | 20:00 |

NYC Foetus: The DVD
| No. | Title | Length |
|---|---|---|
| 1. | "NYC Foetus" | 1:18:55 |
| 2. | "Steroid Maximus: Live in France" | 19:28 |
| 3. | "Foetus: Live in Hannover" | 6:29 |
| 4. | "Manorexia: Live at The Stone NYC" | 11:35 |
| 5. | "J.G. Thirlwell: LEMUR Commission Performance Extract" | 3:09 |

== Personnel ==
- Heung-Heung Chin – art direction
- Harley Cockburn – engineering (1, 3, 5, 6, 10, 11)
- Charles Gray – engineering (1)
- Fred Kevorkian – mastering
- Warne Livesey – engineering (1)
- Elena Park – violin (8)
- Foetus (J. G. Thirlwell) – vocals, instruments, producer, recording, design

== Release history ==
| Region | Date | Label | Format | Catalog |
|---|---|---|---|---|
| United States | 2009 | Ectopic Ents | CD | ECT ENTS 030 |
