= York (First Exit to Brooklyn) =

Live album by The Foetus Symphony Orchestra
- Released: March 11, 1997
- Recorded: July 18, 1996
- Venue: The Anchorage (Brooklyn)
- Genre: Jazz, no wave
- Length: 46:29
- Label: Thirsty Ear
- Producer: J. G. Thirlwell

J. G. Thirlwell chronology
Boil (1996)	York (First Exit to Brooklyn) (1997)	Flow (2001)

Professional ratings
Review scores
Source	Rating
AllMusic	2.5/5 stars

York (First Exit to Brooklyn) is an album by The Foetus Symphony Orchestra featuring Lydia Lunch, released in 1997 by Thirsty Ear Recordings. Unlike Foetus's other albums, York is a wholly collaborative work. A "travelogue and exploration of DUMBO (Down Under the Manhattan Bridge Overpass)", York features J. G. Thirlwell as composer and conductor for a group of notable New York City musicians. The musicians, almost all of whom had worked with Thirlwell before, were encouraged to freely improvise on their parts. Lydia Lunch, a regular Thirlwell collaborator, narrates the proceedings.

== Track listing ==
All tracks are written by J. G. Thirlwell.

No.	Title	Length
1.	"Black Adonis"	10:26
2.	"Crumpled City"	10:00
3.	"Puddlin' Doorway"	9:07
4.	"Egomaniacs With Insecurity Problems"	10:12
5.	"Arschficken"	6:44

- "Arschficken" is a version of Wiseblood's "The Fudge Punch."

== Personnel ==
- Steven Bernstein – trumpet, slide trumpet
- Oren Bloedow – guitar, electric oud
- Brian Emrich – bass guitar, EBow, keyboard bass
- Lydia Lunch – spoken word
- David Ouimet – trombone
- Marcus Rojas – tuba, didgeridoo
- Vinnie Signorelli – drums
- Rob Sutton – engineering
- J. G. Thirlwell – vocals, conch, tin whistle, production, illustrations
- Kurt Wolf – guitar
