= Ectopia (album) =

Studio album by Steroid Maximus
- Released: May 28, 2002
- Recorded: Self Immolation Studios, Brooklyn, New York
- Genre: Electronica, jazz
- Length: 52:16
- Label: Ipecac
- Producer: J. G. Thirlwell

Steroid Maximus chronology
Gondwanaland (1992)	Ectopia (2002)

J. G. Thirlwell chronology
Blow (2001)	Ectopia (2002)	The Radiolarian Ooze (2002)

Professional ratings
Review scores
Source	Rating
AllMusic	3/5 stars
Uncut	4/5 stars

Ectopia is an album from Steroid Maximus. It was released on May 28, 2002 by Ipecac Recordings.

Ectopia is Ectopic Entertainment #ECT ENTS 023.

== Track listing ==
All songs by J. G. Thirlwell unless noted.

1. "The Trembler" – 5:23
2. "Seventy Cops" – 4:50
3. "L'espion Qui a Pleure" – 4:16
4. "Naught" (Thirlwell, Jim Coleman) – 4:52
5. "Chain Reaction" – 4:11
6. "Bad Day in Greenpoint" (Thirlwell, Brian Emrich) – 4:17
7. "Aclectasis" – 4:18
8. "Tarmac a Gris Gris" – 3:56
9. "'Pusher' Jones" – 3:49
10. "Wm" – 3:02
11. "Chaiste" – 6:49
12. "Enzymes" – 2:33
- The flute throughout "The Trembler" is actually a sample from the Jethro Tull song "My God".
- The bizarre sounding chants occurring a little after the halfway mark of "Aclectasis" is a sample of the soundtrack for "One Step Beyond", which was covered by the band Fantômas on their album The Director's Cut. Fantômas's vocalist, Mike Patton, is one of the two founders of Ipecac Recordings. Both The Director's Cut and Ectopia were released on this label.

== Personnel and production ==
- J. G. Thirlwell – performance, production, engineering, sleeve design
- Brian Emrich – additional sounds (6)
- Jim Coleman – additional sounds (4)
- Christian Gibbs – guitar (3)
- Steve Bernstein – trumpet (2, 8, 9)
- John Golden – mastering
