= Boil (album) =

Live album by Foetus
- Released: 20 August 1996
- Recorded: Glasgow, Brussels, and Dublin (February 1996)
- Genre: Industrial
- Length: 56:07
- Label: Cleopatra

Foetus chronology
Null (1995)	Boil (1996)	York (First Exit to Brooklyn) (1997)

Professional ratings
Review scores
Source	Rating
AllMusic	link
Sonic-boom.com	(ambiguous) link

Boil is a live album by Foetus released in 1996. Boil is culled from Foetus' Rednecropolis 96 European tour.

== Track listing ==
All songs by J. G. Thirlwell, except where noted.

1. "Take It Outside Godboy" – 3:04
2. "Clothes Hoist" – 3:17
3. "Verklemmt" – 4:29
4. "I'll Meet You in Poland Baby" – 6:06
5. "I Am the Walrus" (Lennon/McCartney) – 7:08
6. "They Are Not So True" – 4:25
7. "Hot Horse" – 4:18
8. "Mortgage" – 5:59
9. "Mighty Whity" – 3:57
10. "Elected" (A. Cooper/M. Bruce/G. Buxton/D. Dunaway/N. Smith) – 7:37
11. "Sonic Reducer" (Chrome/Thomas) – 4:48
12. "Hello There" (Rick Nielsen) – 2:23

All songs not written by Thirlwell are covers.

== Personnel ==
- J. G. Thirlwell - Master of Disaster, vocals
- Brian Emrich - bass
- William Tucker - guitar
- Rob "Rok" Sutton - keyboard, guitar
- Kurt Wolf - guitar
- Jim Kimball - drums

== Production ==
- J. G. Thirlwell - remastering
- Rob Sutton - remastering
- Kurt Wolf - remastering
- Andy Ray - live sound
