= Sink (Foetus album) =

Compilation album by Foetus Inc
- Released: October 1989
- Recorded: Livingston, London; Paradise, London; Lavender Sound, London; VPRO, Hilversum and BC, Brooklyn (Oct 1980–Mar 1989)
- Genre: Industrial
- Length: 70:22
- Label: Self Immolation/Some Bizzare,
- Producer: J. G. Thirlwell

Foetus Inc chronology
Rife (1988)	Sink (1989)	Butterfly Potion (1990)

Professional ratings
Review scores
Source	Rating
Allmusic	4.5/5 stars
Sounds Magazine	3.5/5 stars
College Music Journal	(favorable)

Sink is a Foetus Inc compilation album that was first released in 1989 on Self Immolation/Some Bizzare. It compiles rare and unreleased songs from various Foetus projects from 1981–1989. Many of the rare tracks on the album have been edited shorter than their original length.

Sink is Foetus' final Some Bizzare record and it was released in 1995 thanks to Some Bizzare Label Thirsty Ear's effort to reissue the Foetus catalogue. All versions' liner notes contain an up-to-date Foetus discography.

Sink is Self Immolation #WOMB INC 6.

== Track listing ==
All songs by J. G. Thirlwell.

1. "Bedrock" – 7:07 by The Foetus All Nude Revue
  as on Bedrock
2. "Ramrod" – 5:49 by Scraping Foetus off the Wheel
  edited from Ramrod
3. "Boxhead" – 3:40 by Scraping Foetus off the Wheel
  as on Ramrod
4. "Lilith" – 4:17 by Foetus Eruptus
  previously unreleased
5. "Shut" – 0:54 by The Foetus All Nude Revue
  as on Bedrock
6. "Diabolus in Musica" – 7:06 by The Foetus All Nude Revue
  edited from Bedrock
7. "Smut" – 3:44 by Scraping Foetus off the Wheel
  edited from Ramrod
8. "Sick Minutes" – 2:20 by Foetus Über Frisco
  edited from Finely Honed Machine and the Hole U.S. release bonus 12"
9. "Rattlesnake Insurance" – 1:49 by The Foetus All Nude Revue
  as on Bedrock
10. "Himmelfahrtstransport / Primordial Industry" – 2:08 by Foetus In Your Bed
  "Himmelfahrtstransport" previously unreleased
  "Primordial Industry" edited from An Afflicted Man's Musica Box compilation
11. "Spit on the Griddle (The Drowning of G. Walhof)" – 3:39 by Foetus Eruptus
  previously unreleased
12. "Anxiety Attack" – 5:44, [– 5:09 CD] by Scraping Foetus off the Wheel
  previously unreleased
13. "Baphomet" – 1:05 by Foetus Interruptus
  previously unreleased
14. "(The Only Good Christian is a) Dead Christian" – 3:21 by Scraping Foetus off the Wheel
  as on If You Can't Please Yourself, You Can't Please Your Soul compilation
15. "Halo Flamin Lead" – 4:24 by Scraping Foetus off the Wheel
  edited from the NME compilation cassette Mad Mix 2 (credited to You've Got Foetus on Your Breath) and the Hole U.S. release bonus 12"
16. "OKFM" – 4:25 by Foetus Under Glass
  edited from Spite Your Face/OKFM
17. "Catastrophe Crunch" – 4:12 by Foetus Art Terrorism
  edited from Calamity Crush
18. "Wash (It All Off)" – 3:57 by You've Got Foetus on Your Breath
  edited from Wash/Slog and the Hole U.S. release bonus 12"
19. "(Today I Started) Slog(ging Again)" – 4:51 by You've Got Foetus on Your Breath
  edited from Wash/Slog and the Hole U.S. release bonus 12"
20. "Calamity Crush" – 4:12 by Foetus Art Terrorism
  edited from Calamity Crush

== Personnel and production ==
- J. G. Thirlwell - Performance, production, composition
- Warne Livesey - Engineering, recording, mixing
- Harlan Cockburn - Engineering, recording, mixing
- Charles Gray - Engineering, recording, mixing
- Martin Bisi - Engineering, recording, mixing, editing
