= Rife (Foetus album) =

Live album by Foetus Corruptus
- Released: September 9, 1989
- Recorded: 1988 in Europe
- Genre: Industrial
- Length: 78:49
- Label: Self Immolation/Some Bizzare
- Producer: J. G. Thirlwell

J. G. Thirlwell chronology
Thaw (1988)	Rife (1989)	Sink (1989)

Professional ratings
Review scores
Source	Rating
AllMusic	2/5 stars

Rife is a live album by Foetus Corruptus released in 1989. It is an official bootleg, initially released by J. G. Thirlwell with no record label credit. This album was released in three formats: a two-LP set on black vinyl, a two-LP picture disc set, and a CD. Rife is Self Immolation #RIFLE 1 and #RIFLEPIC 1 for the picture disc.

After its initial release, Jungle Records was authorized in 1988 to produce a limited edition official release of 2,000 albums split between the three formats. Jungle itself self-bootlegged Rife in 1996, producing 500 additional, unauthorized picture disc albums. In 1998, Jungle licensed Rife to Invisible Records, which began producing additional (and possibly unauthorized) CDs.

== Track listing ==
All songs by J. G. Thirlwell unless noted.

1. "Fin" – 2:58
2. "Don't Hide It Provide It" – ?: LP formats only
3. "Honey I'm Home" – 7:47
4. "The Dipsomaniac Kiss" – 5:51
5. "English Faggot" – 6:12
6. "Grab Yr. Ankles" – 6:00
7. "Slut" (Thirlwell / Marc Almond) – 3:25
8. "A Prayer for My Death" – 6:26
9. "¡Chingada!" – 8:00
10. "Hate Feeler" (Alex Harvey / Hugh McKenna) – 8:10
11. "The Fudge Punch" (Thirlwell / Roli Mosimann) – 8:02
12. "Clothes Hoist" – 4:37
13. "Private War/Anything (Viva!)" – 11:21 omitted from Invisible CD
- Many of the songs have slightly different titles on the black vinyl set.
- "Slut" originally by Thirlwell's Flesh Volcano project.
- "Hate Feeler" is a cover of The Sensational Alex Harvey Band's "Faith Healer".
- "The Fudge Punch" originally by Thirlwell's Wiseblood project.

== Personnel ==
- Algis Kizys – bass guitar
- Ted Parsons – drums
- J. G. Thirlwell (as Clint Ruin) – vocals
- Raymond Watts (as Ray Scaballero or Raymondo Watts) – keyboards, guitar
- Norman Westberg – guitar
