= Blow (Foetus album) =

Remix album by Foetus
- Released: September 18, 2001
- Genre: Industrial
- Length: 61:15
- Label: Thirsty Ear
- Producer: J. G. Thirlwell

Foetus chronology
Flow (2001)	Blow (2001)	(not adam) (2004)

J. G. Thirlwell chronology
Volvox Turbo (2001)	Blow (2001)	Ectopia (2002)

Professional ratings
Review scores
Source	Rating
Allmusic	4/5 stars
Alternative Press	4/5 stars
Q	3/5 stars

Blow is a Foetus remix album, released on September 18, 2001, through Thirsty Ear. European label nois-o-lution issued a 2LP version in November of the same year. Blow contains remixes from Foetus' Flow.

== Track listing ==
All tracks are written by J. G. Thirlwell.

No.	Title	Length
1.	"Cirrhosis of the Heart" (Amon Tobin Mix)	6:35
2.	"The Need Machine" (Franz Treichler Mix)	5:49
3.	"Victim or Victor?" (Jay Wasco Mix)	3:58
4.	"Mandelay" (Phylr Mix)	4:59
5.	"Quick Fix" (Charlie Clouser Mix)	5:28
6.	"Kreibabe" (Pan Sonic Mix)	4:19
7.	"Shun" (Kid606 Mix)	4:08
8.	"Suspect" (DJ Food "Feed Em Their Rights" Mix)	6:02
9.	"Grace of God" (Kidneythieves/Sean Beavan Mix)	4:25
10.	"Heuldoch 7B" (Panacea Mix)	3:48
11.	"Someone Who Cares" (Ursula 1000 "Sheracer" Mix)	4:16
12.	"The Need Machine" (J. G. Thirlwell Mix)	7:28

== Personnel ==
- Drew Anderson – mastering
- Steve Schwartz – art direction
- J. G. Thirlwell (as Foetus) – vocals, production, illustrations
