= Dirtdish =

Studio album by Wiseblood
- Released: 1986
- Recorded: May 1985–September 1986
- Studio: Wave Studios, London, England
- Genre: Industrial
- Length: 39:07
- Label: K.422
- Producer: Wiseblood

J. G. Thirlwell chronology
| Nail (1985) | Dirtdish (1986) | Bedrock (1987) |

Professional ratings
Review scores
| Source | Rating |
|---|---|
| AllMusic | 3/5 stars |

Dirtdish is the sole studio album by English-based industrial act Wiseblood. It was released in 1986 by K.422/Some Bizzare. It was re-released on CD in 1995 by Thirsty Ear. The CD release of Dirtdish is Some Bizzare #WISE 3CD.

Fear Factory covered "O-O (Where Evil Dwells)" on their album Obsolete.

== Critical reception ==
Trouser Press wrote that "if the album lacks a full load of explosive Foetus audio dynamite, it still packs enough ugliness and venom to corrupt a monastery." Spin wrote that the album "allows Foetus the space to fully unfurl the thick, viscous wordchains he uses for lyrics." Dave Thompson, in Alternative Rock, called the album "disappointing" and "not the full frontal assault one would hope to find." CMJ New Music Report wrote that "the songs all build on heavy, intense tribal percussion overlaid with bits of whiney distorted guitar."

== Track listing ==
All songs by Clint Ruin & Roli Mosimann unless noted.

1. "Prime Gonzola" – 5:35
2. "0-0 (Where Evil Dwells)" – 5:20
3. "Stumbo" – 7:40
4. "Someone Drowned In My Pool" (Ruin) – 7:37
5. "Godbrain" – 6:57
6. "The Fudge Punch" – 6:34

=== Extended CD track list ===
7. "Motorslug" – 9:37
8. "Stumbo (12" Version)" – 6:34
9. "Death Rape 2000" – 7:29
10. "Someone Drowned In My Pool (12" Version)" – 7:42 Thirsty Ear CD only

- "Motorslug" and "Death Rape 2000" comprised the "Motorslug" 12" single.
- "Stumbo (12" Version)" and "Someone Drowned In My Pool (12" Version)" comprised the "Stumbo" 12" single. Both are remixes of the album tracks.
- "0-0 (Where Evil Dwells)" is about murderer Ricky Kasso

== Personnel ==
Wiseblood - performance, production

- Clint Ruin - all instruments, lead vocals, sleeve design (as J. G. Thirlwell)
- Roli Mosimann - all instruments
- Robert Quine - guitar (1, 4)
- Hahn Rowe - bass guitar (1), violin (4), recording, mixing
- Phoebe Legere - piano (4)
- Norman Westberg - guitar (6)

Technical

- Craig Beaven - recording
- Steve Peck - mixing
- Warne Livesy - mixing
- Jack Adams - mastering
