= (not adam) =

EP by Foetus
- Released: November 2, 2004
- Genre: Industrial
- Length: 17:56
- Label: Ectopic Ents/Birdman
- Producer: J. G. Thirlwell

Foetus chronology
Blow (2001)	(not adam) (2004)	Love (2005)

J. G. Thirlwell chronology
The Radiolarian Ooze (2002)	(not adam) (2004)	Love (2005)

(not adam) is an EP by Australian musical project Foetus, released in 2004 by Ectopic Ents/Birdman. (not adam) was released as a teaser EP for the Love album.

== Track listing ==
All tracks are written by J. G. Thirlwell.

No.	Title	Length
1.	"(Not Adam)"	4:16
2.	"Miracle" (Jay Wasco remix)	4:42
3.	"Not In Your Hands"	5:22
4.	"Time Marches On" (End remix)	3:36

== Personnel ==
Adapted from the (not adam) liner notes.

Musicians

- J. G. Thirlwell – vocals, instruments, production
- Kurt Wolf – guitar (2)

Production and additional personnel

- J. G. Thirlwell – Production, direction, sleeve design
- Jay Wasco – Remix, additional production and arrangement (2)
- Charles Pierce – Remix and additional production (4)

== Release history ==
Region	Date	Label	Format	Catalog
United States	2004	Ectopic Ents	CD	ECT ENTS 026
