= Love (Foetus album) =

Studio album by Foetus
- Released: July 14, 2005
- Recorded: Self Immolation Studios, Brooklyn
- Genre: Industrial
- Length: 55:00
- Labels: Ectopic Ents, Birdman
- Producer: J. G. Thirlwell

Foetus chronology
(not adam) (2004)	Love (2005)	Damp (2006)

Professional ratings
Review scores
Source	Rating
Release	9/10 stars
Prefix	4/5 stars
Brainwashed	(favorable)
Pitchfork	(6/10)

Love is the eighth album by Foetus, released on CD by Ectopic Ents/Birdman Records in 2005. Initial copies include a DVD disc with additional content. It features a dramatic shift in tone and style compared to previous Foetus releases, being more atmospheric and emotional in tone.

== Track listing ==
=== CD ===
All tracks are written by J. G. Thirlwell.

No.	Title	Length
1.	"(Not Adam)"	4:11
2.	"Mon Agonie Douce"	3:29
3.	"Aladdin Reverse"	7:30
4.	"Miracle"	4:48
5.	"Don't Want Me Anymore"	6:44
6.	"Blessed Evening"	3:41
7.	"Pareidolia"	6:01
8.	"Thrush"	6:53
9.	"Time Marches On"	3:07
10.	"How to Vibrate"	8:31

=== DVD ===
==== Love: The Videos ====
- "Blessed Evening" (directed by Karen O, lensed by Spike Jonze)
- "(Not Adam)" (directed by Jeremy Solterbeck)

==== Love: The Short Films ====
- "How to Vibrate" (directed by Kurt Ralske)
- "Mon Agonie Douce" (directed by Clément Tuffreau)

==== Extras ====
- "I'll Meet You in Poland Baby" (taken from the Male DVD)
- "Mary Magdalene" (performed by Rotoskop and featuring vocals by J. G. Thirlwell)
- The Venture Bros. 5 trailers (score by J. G. Thirlwell)
- A Foetus Life: A Documentary on J. G. Thirlwell 2 trailers (directed by Clément Tuffreau)
- "Verklemmt" (directed by Alex Winter) ("hidden" title 17, not available via the menus)

== Personnel ==
- J. G. Thirlwell – All instruments and vocals, except:
- Pamelia Kurstin – Theremin (7)
- Jeff Davidson – Trumpet (9)
- Christian Gibbs – Guitar (9)
- Kurt Wolf – Rhythm guitars (4)
- Jennifer Charles – Vocals (8)

== Production ==
- J. G. Thirlwell – Production, composition, arrangements, recording, mixing, sleeve design
- Scott Hull – Mastering
- Heung-Heung Chin – Art direction

== Release history ==
Region	Date	Label	Format	Catalog
United States	2005	Ectopic Ents	CD	ECT ENTS 027
