= Stumbo =

Stumbo may refer to:

- Stumbo the Giant, comics character
- Greg Stumbo (born 1951), US politician
- Stumbo (song), a 1986 single by Wiseblood
