= Wash It All Off =

Single by You've Got Foetus on Your Breath
- B-side: "333"
- Released: April 1981
- Label: Self Immolation
- Songwriter(s): J. G. Thirlwell
- Producer(s): J. G. Thirlwell

J. G. Thirlwell singles chronology
"Wash It All Off" (1981)	"Tell Me, What Is the Bane of Your Life" (1982)

"Wash It All Off" is a song by You've Got Foetus on Your Breath, written by J. G. Thirlwell. It was released as a single in April 1981 by Self Immolation, pressed in a limited edition of 1,000 discs.

== Formats and track listing ==
All songs written by J. G. Thirlwell

UK 7" single (WOMB ALL007)

1. "Wash It All Off" - 3:49
2. "333" - 4:09

== Personnel ==
Adapted from the Wash It All Off liner notes.

- J. G. Thirlwell (as You've Got Foetus on Your Breath) – vocals, instruments, production

== Charts ==
Chart (1985)	Peak position
UK Indie Chart	5

== Release history ==
Region	Date	Label	Format	Catalog
United Kingdom	1981	Self Immolation	LP	WOMB ALL007
