= Hide (album) =

Studio album by Foetus
- Released: September 29, 2010
- Recorded: Self Immolation Studios, Brooklyn
- Genres: Experimental, contemporary classical, psychedelic
- Length: 50:51
- Label: Ectopic Ents ECT ENTS 033
- Producer: J. G. Thirlwell

Foetus chronology
Limb (2009)	Hide (2010)	Soak (2013)

J. G. Thirlwell chronology
The Mesopelagic Waters (2010)	Hide (2010)	Dinoflagellate Blooms (2011)

Professional ratings
Review scores
Source	Rating
Brainwashed	(favorable)
Whisperin' & Hollerin'	10/10 stars

Hide is the ninth studio album by Foetus, released on CD by Ectopic Ents on September 29, 2010. Initial copies included a 5″ x 5″ sticker of the front cover, signed by J. G. Thirlwell.

== Track listing ==
All tracks are written by J. G. Thirlwell.

No.	Title	Length
1.	"Cosmetics"	8:39
2.	"Paper Slippers"	5:33
3.	"Stood Up"	4:19
4.	"Here Comes the Rain"	4:34
5.	"Oilfields"	6:41
6.	"Concrete"	2:35
7.	"The Ballad of Sisyphus T. Jones"	5:56
8.	"Fortitudine Vincemus"	0:47
9.	"You're Trying to Break Me"	8:32
10.	"O Putrid Sun (for Yuko)"	3:10

== Personnel ==
- J. G. Thirlwell – All instruments and vocals, except:
- Abby Fischer – Vocals on tracks 1, 5, 7, 8
- Steven Bernstein – Trumpet, alto horn on 2, 3, 7
- Leyna Marika Papach – Violin on 3, 7, 10
- Elliot Hoffman – Drums on 1
- Ed Pastorini – Piano on 10
- Jeff Davidson – Drums on 10
- Christian Gibbs – Guitar on 7

== Production ==
- J. G. Thirlwell – Production, composition, arrangements, recording, mixing, sleeve design
- Heung-Heung Chin – Art direction
