= Null (Foetus EP) =

EP by Foetus
- Released: 1995
- Recorded: Unique, New York City, NY
- Genre: Industrial
- Length: 33:15
- Label: Big Cat
- Producer: J. G. Thirlwell

J. G. Thirlwell chronology
| Gash (1995) | Null (1995) | Boil (1996) |

Professional ratings
Review scores
| Source | Rating |
|---|---|
| AllMusic | 3/5 stars |

Null is a Foetus EP released in 1995 by Big Cat in the UK. Null acts as a De facto single for "Verklemmt," released on Gash. Promotional copies of Null were distributed by Sony/Columbia in the US, but the EP had no official US release. Null was later rereleased as half of the Null/Void double-CDEP set in 1997.

== Track listing ==
All tracks are written by J. G. Thirlwell.

| No. | Title | Length |
|---|---|---|
| 1. | "Verklemmt" | 4:43 |
| 2. | "Be Thankful" | 4:50 |
| 3. | "Verklemmt" (Protecto Mix) | 8:54 |
| 4. | "Butter" | 4:05 |
| 5. | "Into the Light" | 6:49 |
| 6. | "Verklemmt" (Queef Mix) | 3:52 |

== Personnel ==
- Brian Freeman – art direction
- Rob Sutton – engineering
- J. G. Thirlwell (as Foetus) – instruments, arrangement, production, illustrations
- Howie Weinberg – mastering
