= Hole (Foetus album) =

Studio album by Scraping Foetus Off the Wheel
- Released: September 1984
- Recorded: May 1983–October 1983
- Studios: Wave Studios, London, England
- Genres: Industrial, Gothabilly
- Length: 42:46
- Label: Self Immolation/Some Bizzare
- Producer: J. G. Thirlwell

J. G. Thirlwell chronology
| Ache (1982) | Hole (1984) | Nail (1985) |

Professional ratings
Review scores
| Source | Rating |
|---|---|
| AllMusic | 3/5 stars |
| Sounds | 4.5/5 stars |

Hole is the third studio album by Scraping Foetus Off the Wheel released in September 1984. It was the first Foetus material released by Self Immolation Records through Some Bizzare. In 1995, Hole was given a US re-release by Thirsty Ear. It was also the first of two Foetus releases under the name Scraping Foetus Off the Wheel, the other being Nail.

Hole is Self Immolation #WOMB FDL 3.

== Track listing ==
All tracks are written by J. G. Thirlwell.

Side one
| No. | Title | Length |
|---|---|---|
| 1. | "Clothes Hoist" | 3:25 |
| 2. | "Lust for Death" | 3:38 |
| 3. | "I'll Meet You in Poland Baby" | 4:50 |
| 4. | "Hot Horse" | 3:31 |
| 5. | "Sick Man" | 4:15 |

Side two
| No. | Title | Length |
|---|---|---|
| 1. | "Street of Shame" | 3:28 |
| 2. | "Satan Place" | 3:22 |
| 3. | "White Knuckles" | 4:31 |
| 4. | "Water Torture" | 3:50 |
| 5. | "Cold Day in Hell" | 7:03 |

A vinyl test pressing is released which includes two additional tracks "Sick Man Edit" [1:07] (end of LP side 1) and "Cold Day In Hell Edit" [1:14] (end of LP side 2). Both are edited versions of the originals.

=== Bonus 12" ===
Some copies of the original LP release were packaged with a 12" containing bonus tracks. These tracks later appeared, variously, on Wash/Slog, Finely Honed Machine, and Sink.

1. "Wash It All Off" – 6:05
2. "Sick Minutes" – 8:43
3. "Halo Flamin' Lead" – 4:51
4. "Finely Honed Machine" – 9:23
5. "Today I Started Slogging Again" – 7:34

== Personnel ==
- Charles Gray – engineering
- Warne Livesy – engineering
- J. G. Thirlwell (as Scraping Foetus Off the Wheel) – instruments, production, illustrations

== Charts ==
| Chart (1984) | Peak position |
|---|---|
| UK Indie Chart | 3 |
