= Sick (Sow album) =

Studio album by Sow
- Released: 1998
- Recorded: Ranch Apocalypse, London
- Genre: Spoken word, Industrial
- Length: 52:35
- Label: Invisible Records
- Producer: Sow, Raymond Watts

Sow chronology
Je M'Aime (1994)	Sick (1998)	Dog (2010)

Sick is the second studio album by Sow released in 1998. This album spawned no singles. At this time Sow comprises Anna Wildsmith with "Boys", where the Boys are Raymond Watts, Euphonic, Sascha Konietzko, Hoppy Kamiyama & Optical 8, Martin King, and Günter Schulz.

== Releases ==
- Invisible Records #INV 128 CD - CD, 1998
- Blue Noise #DRCN-25017 - CD, 1998

== Track listing ==
1. "Ssik" - 6:55
2. "Jo The Lover" - 4:45
3. "Shrub" - 3:47
4. "Ego Head" - 6:13
5. "Strip" - 6:03
6. "K-Casino" - 8:21
7. "Wedge" - 6:34
8. "Working For God" - 6:50
9. "Scar" - 3:07

Total playing time: 52:35

== Personnel ==
- Euphonic – writing and instruments (tracks: 2, 5)
- Hoppy Kamiyama and Optical 8 – writing and instruments (track 6)
- Martin King – writing and instruments (track 8)
- Dave Murder – additional engineering and mixing
- Sascha Konietzko – writing and instruments (track 3)
- Günter Schulz – writing and instruments (track 9)
- Raymond Watts – production, writing and instruments (track: 1, 4, 7)
- Steve White – additional programming and vocal recording
- Anna Wildsmith – production, lyrics, vocal performance

Design

- Martin Thompson – cover and additional photography
