= Wiseblood (band) =

American electronic/noise-rock band

- Genres: Industrial, electronic, noise-rock
- Years active: 1985–1991
- Labels: K.422, Wax Trax!, Relativity, Big Cat, Thirsty Ear
- Past members: J. G. Thirlwell; Roli Mosimann

Wiseblood was an American electronic/noise-rock band formed by Clint Ruin (a.k.a. J. G. Thirlwell) and Roli Mosimann, existing intermittently from 1985 through the early 1990s. The band was named after the 1952 Flannery O'Connor novel Wise Blood. In Ruin's words, Wiseblood was "violent macho American [music] made by non-Americans". The duo's material tended toward the realm of the darkest and most sexual Foetus songs, with Mosimann's Swans lineage showing in the slow, crushing pacing of many tracks. Thematically, Wiseblood's lyrics centered on the misanthropic exertion of power, typically via murder, sex or assault.

== Discography ==
=== Studio albums ===
- Dirtdish (1987, K.422/Relativity Records)

=== Singles and EPs ===
- "Motorslug" (1985, K.422/Wax Trax! Records)
- "Stumbo" (1986, K.422/Relativity Records)
- PTTM (1991, Big Cat Records)

=== Compilation appearances ===
- "Cough'N'Kill" on Plow! (1985, Organik)

== See also ==
- J. G. Thirlwell
