= Baby Ray (band) =

American rock band

Baby Ray is a band from Cambridge, Massachusetts that was formed in the 1996 from members of the band Brain Helicopter. The founding members are Ken Lafler and Erich Groat (also of Willard Grant Conspiracy). Their sound carries a pop sensibility, while still adhering to the alternative style of rock from the 90's. The Boston Phoenix described the band's music as a "clever kind of contortionist pop, with its pretzel-shaped melodies and impishly bratty wordplay".

== Discography ==
- Monkey Puzzle (Thirsty Ear, 1998)
- Do I Love America (Thirsty Ear, 1999)
- Demonstration (self-released promo, 2001)
- Low Rises (Dren, 2006)
