= Deaf (album) =

Studio album by You've Got Foetus on Your Breath
- Released: September 1981
- Recorded: 1981
- Studios: Lavender Sound, London, England
- Genre: Experimental
- Length: 46:38
- Label: Self Immolation
- Producer: J. G. Thirlwell

J. G. Thirlwell chronology
Deaf (1981)	Custom Built for Capitalism (1982)

Professional ratings
Review scores
Source	Rating
AllMusic	2.5/5 stars
The Encyclopedia of Popular Music	3/5 stars
Pitchfork	(6.3/10)

Deaf is the first studio album by J. G. Thirlwell's You've Got Foetus on Your Breath, released in 1981 on Thirlwell's own Self Immolation Records label. Deaf, along with its follow-up Ache, was recorded with an 8-track recorder.

Both releases were limited editions: only 2,000 copies of the LP and 4,000 copies of the CD were produced. The Deaf LP is Self Immolation #WOMB OYBL 1. The CD re-release is Ectopic Ents #ECT ENTS 012.

Thirsty Ear reissued the album as a CD in 1997 in the US.

== Track listing ==
All tracks are written by J. G. Thirlwell.

Side one
No.	Title	Length
1.	"New York or Bust"	2:00
2.	"Is That a Line?"	7:09
3.	"Why Can't It Happen to Me?"	3:14
4.	"I Am Surrounded by Incompetence"	4:52
5.	"What Have You Been Doing?"	5:32

Side two
No.	Title	Length
1.	"Today I Started Slogging Again"	5:48
2.	"Harold MacMillan"	3:35
3.	"Thank Heaven for Push Button Phones"	4:26
4.	"Flashback"	3:37
5.	"Negative Energy"	6:08

The final track on the CD seems to approximate a locked groove, with the same few seconds of music repeated for the final 10 minutes.

== Personnel ==
- Harlan Cockburn – engineering
- J. G. Thirlwell (as You've Got Foetus On Your Breath) – instruments, production, illustrations
