= Tell Me, What Is the Bane of Your Life =

Single by Phillip and His Foetus Vibrations
- B-side: "Mother, I’ve Killed the Cat"
- Released: January 1982
- Genre: Industrial
- Label: Self Immolation
- Songwriter(s): J. G. Thirlwell
- Producer(s): J. G. Thirlwell

J. G. Thirlwell singles chronology
"Wash It All Off" (1981)	"Tell Me, What Is the Bane of Your Life" (1982)	"Calamity Crush" (1984)

Tell Me, What Is the Bane of Your Life is a song by Phillip and His Foetus Vibrations, written by J. G. Thirlwell. It was released as a single in January 1982 by Self Immolation.

== Formats and track listing ==
All songs written by J. G. Thirlwell

UK 7" single (WOMB KX 07)

1. "Tell Me, What Is the Bane of Your Life" – 7:32
2. "Mother, I've Killed the Cat" – 4:38

== Personnel ==
Adapted from the Tell Me, What Is the Bane of Your Life liner notes.

- J. G. Thirlwell (as Phillip and His Foetus Vibrations) – vocals, instruments, production
- Geoff Pesche – mastering

== Charts ==
Chart (1984)	Peak position
UK Indie Chart	30

== Release history ==
Region	Date	Label	Format	Catalog
United Kingdom	1982	Self Immolation	LP	WOMB KX 07
