= Soak (album) =

Studio album by Foetus
- Released: October 15, 2013
- Recorded: 2010–2013 at Self Immolation Studios, Brooklyn, NY
- Genre: Experimental rock
- Length: 52:30
- Label: Ectopic Ents
- Producer: J. G. Thirlwell

Foetus chronology
Hide (2010)	Soak (2013)	Halt (2025)

J. G. Thirlwell chronology
Dinoflagellate Blooms (2011)	Soak (2013)	The Blue Eyes (2013)

Professional ratings
Review scores
Source	Rating
Pitchfork	(6.9/10)

Soak is the tenth studio album by Foetus, released on October 15, 2013, by Ectopic Ents. It acts as the satellite album for the 2010 album Hide.

== Track listing ==
No.	Title	Writer(s)	Length
1.	"Red and Black and Gray and White"	J. G. Thirlwell	2:46
2.	"Pratheism"	J. G. Thirlwell	5:29
3.	"Alabaster"	J. G. Thirlwell	3:16
4.	"Warm Leatherette"	Daniel Miller	3:21
5.	"Kamikaze"	J. G. Thirlwell	6:16
6.	"Halloween/Turbulence"	John Carpenter/J. G. Thirlwell	3:14
7.	"La Rua Madureira"	Nino Ferrer	4:34
8.	"Danger Global Warming" (J. G. Thirlwell remix (Only on CD version))	Hugh Cornwell	5:40
9.	"Spat"	J. G. Thirlwell	5:52
10.	"Cosmetics" (Secret Chiefs 3 remix)	J. G. Thirlwell	8:17
11.	"Mesmerin"	J. G. Thirlwell	3:45

== Personnel ==
Musicians

- Jeff Davidson – drums (1)
- Foetus (J. G. Thirlwell) – vocals, instruments, producer, photography, design
- Abby Fischer – additional vocals (3, 10)
- Natalie Galpern – additional vocals (2, 6, 9, 11)
- Elliot Hoffman – drums (10)
- Jason Schimmel – remixing (10)
- Trey Spruance – remixing (10)

Technical personnel

- Al Carlson – additional mixing (1, 2, 5, 6, 9)
- Heung-Heung Chin – art direction
- Scott Hull – mastering

== Release history ==
Region	Date	Label	Format	Catalog
United States	2013	Ectopic Ents	CD	ECT ENTS 035
