= Stinkfist (EP) =

EP by Clint Ruin and Lydia Lunch
- Released: 1987
- Recorded: Eldorado, Los Angeles (April 1, 1986) and B.C., New York (Dec 12–13, 1987)
- Genre: Industrial
- Length: 20:39
- Label: Widowspeak
- Producer: Clint Ruin

J. G. Thirlwell chronology
Ramrod (1987)	Stinkfist (1987)	Thaw (1988)

Lydia Lunch chronology
Honeymoon in Red (1987)	Stinkfist (1987)	Drowning in Limbo (1989)

Professional ratings
Review scores
Source	Rating
AllMusic	2/5 stars

Stinkfist is a collaborative EP by Clint Ruin (a.k.a. J. G. Thirlwell) and Lydia Lunch. This outing from the ex-Immaculate Consumptive bandmates was originally released as a 12" in 1987 on Lunch's Widowspeak label.

== Content ==
The album cover shows Lunch and Ruin—lovers at the time—in a coital embrace.

== Release ==
Stinkfist was released in 1987 by record label Widowspeak. A 1989 CD version added "The Crumb", a single by Lunch and Sonic Youth leader Thurston Moore.

== Reception ==
Trouser Press wrote "Stinkfist could be the first joint effort [Lydia Lunch] doesn't dominate [...] Lots of noise and energy but nothing new, especially for the already Foetusized."

== Track listing ==
All tracks are written by Lydia Lunch and Clint Ruin, except "The Crumb" co-written by Thurston Moore.

Side one
No.	Title	Length
1.	"Stinkfist"	6:57

Side two
No.	Title	Length
1.	"Meltdown Oratorio" (I: The Reckoning/II: The Crack/III: The Meltdown)	8:55
2.	"Son of Stink"	3:47

CD bonus track
No.	Title	Length
4.	"The Crumb"	5:39

== Personnel and production ==
"Stinkfist" and "Son of Stink":

- Cliff Martinez – drums, metal
- DJ Bonebrake – drums, metal
- Neil – drums, metal
- Spit – drums, metal
- Tom Surgal – metal
- Roli Mosimann – timbales, engineering
- Lydia Lunch – voices, metal
- Clint Ruin – voices, metal
- Randy Burns – engineering
- Hahn Rowe – engineering

"Meltdown Oratorio":

- Lydia Lunch – voices
- Clint Ruin – instruments
- Martin Bisi – engineering

"The Crumb":

- Thurston Moore – guitars, voice
- Lydia Lunch – voice
- Clint Ruin – loops, treatments, production
- Bass/drums – "grafted and transplanted from eternity." Bass and drums are reworked from Lydia Lunch's "Dead in the Head" on her Honeymoon in Red album. Though uncredited, the original performance is by Ruin.
- Martin Bisi – engineering

== Charts ==
Chart (1988)	Peak position
UK Indie Chart	18
