= The Mesopelagic Waters =

Studio album by Manorexia
- Released: March 23, 2010
- Recorded: December 3, 2009 at East Side Sound, New York City
- Genre: Modern classical
- Length: 48:34
- Label: Tzadik
- Producer: J. G. Thirlwell

Manorexia chronology
The Radiolarian Ooze (2002)	The Mesopelagic Waters (2010)	Dinoflagellate Blooms (2011)

J. G. Thirlwell chronology
Limb (2009)	The Mesopelagic Waters (2010)	Hide (2010)

Professional ratings
Review scores
Source	Rating
AllMusic	4/5 stars

The Mesopelagic Waters is the third studio album that J. G. Thirlwell has issued under the pseudonym Manorexia. It was released on March 23, 2010, by Tzadik Records. It comprises music from the previous two Manorexia releases that has been arranged for strings, piano and percussion and re-recorded.

== Track listing ==
All music is composed by J. G. Thirlwell.

No.	Title	Length
1.	"Armadillo Stance"	5:01
2.	"Canaries in the Mineshaft"	4:20
3.	"Toxodon Mourning"	7:45
4.	"Zithromax Jitters"	5:19
5.	"Chloe Don't Know I'm Alive"	8:08
6.	"Fluorescent Radiation"	4:57
7.	"Tubercular Bells"	4:00
8.	"Tranque"	9:02

== Personnel ==
Musicians

- David Broome – piano
- David Cossin – percussion, ocarina (3)
- Felix Fan – cello
- Ted Hearne – musical arrangements (1, 3, 4, 7, 8)
- Leyna Papach – violin, backing vocals (3)
- Elena Park – violin, backing vocals (3)
- David Shohl – musical arrangements (2, 5, 6)
- J. G. Thirlwell – sampler, keyboards, musical arrangements, producer, backing vocals (3), tin whistle (3), strings (8)
- Karen Waltuch – viola, backing vocals (3)

Technical personnel

- Heung-Heung Chin – design
- Scott Hull – mastering
- Marylène Mey – photography
- John Zorn – executive producer

== Release history ==
Region	Date	Label	Format	Catalog
United States	2010	Tzadik	CD	TZ 8072
