= Thaw (Foetus album) =

Studio album by Foetus Interruptus
- Released: September 1988
- Recorded: December 1987–March 1988 at BC Studio, Brooklyn, New York
- Genre: Industrial
- Length: 39:34
- Label: Self Immolation Records/Some Bizzare
- Producer: J. G. Thirlwell

J. G. Thirlwell chronology
Stinkfist (1987)	Thaw (1988)	Rife (1988)

Thaw is the fifth studio album by Foetus Interruptus, released by Self Immolation Records/Some Bizzare in September 1988 and also released on Some Bizzare in 1995 by Thirsty Ear.

It is also the only Foetus studio album released under the name Foetus Interruptus; every studio album after has been released under the name Foetus.

== Background and production ==
Thaw was recorded between December 1987 and March 1988 at BC Studio in Brooklyn, New York. Engineering was handled by the American producer and songwriter Martin Bisi. The album was written, arranged, and produced by J. G. Thirlwell, credited in the liner notes under his alias Clint Ruin.

According to the Official Foetus Discography, the track "English Faggot/Nothin Man" was inspired by a threatening and homophobic message that Thirlwell received on his answering machine.

== Reception ==
Professional ratings
Review scores
Source	Rating
AllMusic	4.5/5 stars
NME	4/5 stars
Sounds	3/5 stars

Thaw peaked at number 3 on the UK Indie Chart. Writing for Trouser Press, critic Ira Robbins described the album as "an explosive sonic smorgasbord in a free-fire zone" and called it "oppressive in the most rewarding fashion imaginable."

== Track listing ==
All tracks are written by J. G. Thirlwell.

No.	Title	Length
1.	"Don't Hide It Provide It"	4:29
2.	"Asbestos"	5:01
3.	"Fin"	0:37
4.	"English Faggot/Nothin Man"	3:38
5.	"Hauss-on-Fah"	5:56
6.	"Fratricide Pastorale"	1:59
7.	"The Dipsomaniac Kiss"	4:12
8.	"Barbedwire Tumbleweed"	3:25
9.	"¡Chingada!" (in Spanish, translation here)	3:16
10.	"A Prayer for My Death"	7:01

== Personnel ==
- Martin Bisi – engineering
- J. G. Thirlwell (also credited as Clint Ruin) – instruments, arrangements, production, illustrations

== Charts ==
Chart (1988)	Peak position
UK Indie Chart	3
