= Flow (Foetus album) =

Studio album by Foetus
- Released: May 8, 2001
- Recorded: 2001
- Studios: Self Immolation Studios, Brooklyn, New York
- Genre: Industrial
- Length: 64:48
- Label: Thirsty Ear
- Producer: J. G. Thirlwell

Foetus chronology
York (1997)	Flow (2001)	Blow (2001)

J. G. Thirlwell chronology
York (1997)	Flow (2001)	Volvox Turbo (2001)

Professional ratings
Aggregate scores
Source	Rating
Metacritic	(81/100)
Review scores
Source	Rating
AllMusic	4.5/5 stars
Alternative Press	4/5 stars
Q	3/5 stars

Flow is the seventh album by Foetus, released in 2001 by Thirsty Ear. It is also seen as a return to form for Foetus. The album was remixed as Blow.

== Track listing ==
All tracks are written by J. G. Thirlwell.

No.	Title	Length
1.	"Quick Fix"	4:06
2.	"Cirrhosis of the Heart"	4:02
3.	"Mandelay"	8:21
4.	"Grace of God"	5:42
5.	"The Need Machine"	4:53
6.	"Suspect"	5:54
7.	"(You Got Me Confused With) Someone Who Cares"	3:45
8.	"Heuldoch #7b"	4:47
9.	"Victim or Victor?"	5:03
10.	"Shun"	3:23
11.	"Kreibabe"	12:52

- The opening of track Quick Fix uses a sample of the song "Corrosion" by Ministry (band), from their album Psalm 69 (album).
- Sections of Flow are used in the soundtrack of The Venture Bros. Notably, the song "Mandelay" is the theme music of its namesake character, Mandelay.
- "(You Got Me Confused With) Someone Who Cares" makes significant use of a guitar riff sampled from Electric Light Orchestra's track "Laredo Tornado", from their Eldorado album.

== Personnel ==
Musicians

- Oren Bloedow – guitar on "Victim or Victor?"
- Christian Gibbs – guitar on "Victim or Victor?"
- J. G. Thirlwell (as Foetus) – vocals, instruments, arrangements, production, recording, illustrations
- Hahn Rowe – violin on "Mandelay"

Production and additional personnel

- Drew Anderson – mastering
- Rob Sutton – engineering
- Steve Schwartz – art direction
