= Je M'Aime =

Studio album by Sow
- Released: 1994
- Studio: Ranch Apocalypse, London
- Genre: Spoken word, Industrial
- Length: 41:35
- Label: Hyperium Records
- Producer: Raymond Watts

Sow chronology
Je M'Aime (1994)	Sick (1998)

Alternative Cover

Je M'Aime is the debut studio album by Sow, initially released in 1994. It was released under the PIG vs. Sow moniker upon the album's re-release in 1999.

== Background ==
Sow was the solo project of French musician Anna Wildsmith. In 1989, she released the single "Manripe" on the label Yellow. Both "Manripe" and its b-side "Found in the Lake/4 Years Old" (eventually retitled "The World Is My Oyster") were re-recorded for Je M'Aime. The album contained numerous individuals who assisted with the recording, such as J. G. Thirlwell, Mike Watts, and Jon Caffery. Most notably, Wildsmith's then-partner Raymond Watts assisted on every song as well.

Je M'Aime was initially released under the Sow name by Hyperium Records. The contents in Je M'Aime were mainly spoken word but with instrumental performances. Wildsmith alternated between English, Italian, and French as well. Due to the increased popularity of Watts' PIG project, Je M'Aime was re-released in 1999 by Martin Atkins' Invisible Records, albeit under the PIG vs. Sow name. Only the title and some of the artwork were changed in the re-release.

Wildsmith eventually released two follow-up albums under the Sow name, Sick in 1998 and Dog in 2010. She died of an undisclosed illness in 2016.

== Track listing ==
1. "The Rock" (Wildsmith/R. Watts) - 5:53
2. "The World Is My Oyster" (Wildsmith/M. Watts) - 4:15
3. "Face Of Suede" (Wildsmith/R. Watts) - 6:52
4. "Blood Sucking Bitch" (Wildsmith/Thirlwell) - 6:53
5. "Je M'Aime" (Wildsmith/R. Watts) - 3:28
6. "Gentille Petite Fille" (Wildsmith/R. Watts) - 5:07
7. "Manripe" (Wildsmith/R. Watts) - 9:07

== Personnel ==
- Jon Caffery – recording, mixing (7)
- Benedict Owen – saxophone (5)
- J. G. Thirlwell – instrumentals (4)
- Mike Watts – instrumentals (2)
- Raymond Watts – production, instrumentals, recording, mixing (1–6)
- Anna Wildsmith – vocals

=== 1999 re-release ===
- Fernando Arias – additional photography
- Gerard Ivall – inside booklet design
- Steven Lovell-Davis – cover design
- Dominique Lutier – additional photography
- Martin Thompson – cover and additional photography
