= Ache (album) =

Studio album by You've Got Foetus on Your Breath
- Released: August 1982
- Recorded: 1982
- Studios: Lavender Sound, London, England
- Genre: Industrial
- Length: 41:10
- Label: Self Immolation
- Producer: J. G. Thirlwell

J. G. Thirlwell chronology
Custom Built for Capitalism (1982)	Ache (1982)	Hole (1984)

Ache is the second studio album by You've Got Foetus on Your Breath first released in 1982 on Self Immolation Records. Thirsty Ear reissued the album as a CD in 1997 in the US. Both releases were limited editions: only 1,500 copies of the LP and 4,000 copies of the CD were produced. Ache, along with its predecessor, Deaf, was recorded in an 8-track studio. Ache was the second and final Foetus release under the name You've Got Foetus on Your Breath.

The Ache LP is Self Immolation #WOMB OYBL 2. The CD re-release is Ectopic Ents #ECT ENTS 013.

== Reception ==
Professional ratings
Review scores
Source	Rating
AllMusic	3/5 stars
Pitchfork	(7.6/10)

- AllMusic (Andy Hinds) - "Seemingly a musical omnivore, [Foetus] devours everything and spits it back out in a scrap heap of sonic chaos, twisted beyond recognition. His oblique yet subversive lyrical themes don't make Ache any more palatable for the faint of heart. This is the sound of unfiltered imagination, absolutely unencumbered by notions of commerce or accessibility. Brilliant."
- NME - "Ache is possessed by a bristling, maniacal intelligence which spews out a jostling, surreal collage of subverted musical and verbal cliches, wired word associations, epigrams and sheer invictive with frantic urgency and gleefully black humor. Ache is one of the most violently original and compelling records I've heard in ages. It would make an ideal Christmas present."

== Track listing ==
All tracks are written by J. G. Thirlwell.

Side one
No.	Title	Length
1.	"Dying with My Boots On"	2:16
2.	"J. Q. Murder"	4:21
3.	"Gums Bleed"	4:21
4.	"Mark of the Ostracizor"	5:59
5.	"Exit the Man with 9 Lives"	3:44

Side two
No.	Title	Length
1.	"Get Out of My House"	5:05
2.	"Wholesome Town"	4:24
3.	"Whole Wheat Rolls"	0:59
4.	"Kid Hate Kid"	5:24
5.	"Instead… I Became Anenome"	4:37

== Personnel ==
- Harlan Cockburn – engineering
- J. G. Thirlwell (as You've Got Foetus On Your Breath) – instruments, production, illustrations
