= A Poke in the Eye... with a Sharp Stick =

Studio album by PIG
- Released: 1988
- Genre: Post-industrial
- Length: 40:28; 47:41 (CD version)
- Label: Yellow Ltd. (Germany); Wax Trax! Records (United States)
- Producer: Raymond Watts, John Caffery, JG Thirlwell

PIG chronology
A Poke in the Eye... with a Sharp Stick (1988)	Praise the Lard (1991)

A Poke in the Eye... with a Sharp Stick is a 1988 album by Raymond Watts under the moniker PIG. It was reissued in Japan in 1998 by Blue Noise. An extremely low-budget promotional video for "Shit for Brains" exists, and was released on the Best of Berlin Independence Days '88 compilation VHS.

== Reception ==
The album holds a 4.5/5 rating on AllMusic and is designated as their album pick of his discography.

== Track listing ==
1. "It Tolls for Thee (Pig Breath)" (Raymond Watts) – 4:25
2. "Scumsberg" (Watts) – 4:02
3. "One for the Neck" (Watts) – 3:54
4. "Hildelinde" (traditional) – 2:45
5. "My Favourite Car" (Watts) – 5:01
6. "Never for Fun" (Watts) – 5:26
7. "Shit for Brains" (Watts) – 4:36
8. "Red Man" (Watts) – 6:06
9. "The Press" (Watts) – 3:59
10. "Peoria" (Watts/JG Thirlwell) – 7:13

Track 10 is a bonus track on the US Wax Trax CD version, taken from the European 12" single Sick City/Shit For Brains (Potomak RTD M 28–1)

== Personnel ==
=== PIG ===
- Raymond Watts – vocals, keyboards, programming, lyrics

=== Guests and production ===
- Hanns Joachim Mennicken – guitar on "Scumsberg"
- Alexander Hacke – guitar on tracks 1, 5, 9
- Nikkolai Weidemann – guitar, piano and saxophone on "One for the Neck"
- Axel Dill – drums and piano on "Hildelinde"
- Uwe Wurst – guitar on "My Favorite Car"
- JG Thirlwell – production, lyrics on "Peoria"
- Christian Graupner – percussion on "Scumsberg" and "Red Man"
- John Caffery – production on tracks 1–9
