= Bedrock (EP) =

EP by The Foetus All-Nude Revue
- Released: July 1987
- Recorded: Milo and Paradise, London, England
- Genre: Industrial
- Length: 25:29
- Label: Self Immolation/Some Bizzare
- Producer: J. G. Thirlwell

J. G. Thirlwell chronology
| Dirtdish (1987) | Bedrock (1987) | Ramrod (1987) |

Professional ratings
Review scores
| Source | Rating |
|---|---|
| AllMusic | 3/5 stars |

Bedrock is an EP by The Foetus All-Nude Revue released by Self Immolation/Some Bizzare in 1987.

Bedrock is Self Immolation #WOMB FAN 13.

== Track listing ==
All tracks are written by J. G. Thirlwell.

Side one
| No. | Title | Length |
|---|---|---|
| 1. | "Bedrock" | 7:07 |

Side two
| No. | Title | Length |
|---|---|---|
| 1. | "Diabolus in Musica" | 7:16 |
| 2. | "Shut" | 0:56 |
| 3. | "Rattlesnake Insurance" | 2:16 |
| 4. | "Bedrock Strip" | 7:54 |

Tracks 1–4 appear on Sink.

== Personnel ==
- Charles Gray – engineering
- Warne Livesy – engineering
- J. G. Thirlwell (as The Foetus All-Nude Revue) – instruments, production, illustrations

== Charts ==
| Chart (1987) | Peak position |
|---|---|
| UK Indie Chart | 2 |
