= Motorslug =

Single by Wiseblood
- B-side: "Death Rape 2000"
- Released: May 1985
- Recorded: I.N.S., NYC
- Genre: Industrial
- Length: 9:39
- Label: K.422
- Songwriter(s): Roli Mosimann, J. G. Thirlwell
- Producer(s): Wiseblood

J. G. Thirlwell singles chronology
"Finely Honed Machine" (1984)	"Motorslug" (1985)	"Stumbo" (1986)

"Motorslug" is a song by Wiseblood, written by Roli Mosimann and JG Thirlwell. It was released as a single in May 1985 by K.422 and was included on the CD version of the album Dirtdish.

== Reception ==
John Leland at Spin said, "This is the driver who runs over your dog, and then races away into the night with a slight pang of remorse and an adrenaline rush of bloodlust. It's the guy who fucks your girlfriend even though he doesn't really like her – just to ruin your day.

== Formats and track listing ==
All songs written by Roli Mosimann and J. G. Thirlwell

UK 12" single (WISE 112)

1. "Motorslug" – 9:39
2. "Death Rape 2000" – 7:33

== Personnel ==
Adapted from the Motorslug liner notes.

Wiseblood

- Roli Mosimann – instruments
- J. G. Thirlwell (as Clint Ruin) – vocals, instruments, engineering

Production and additional personnel

- Jack Adams – engineering
- Ian North – engineering
- Steve Peck – mixing
- Wiseblood – musical arrangement, production

== Charts ==
Chart (1985)	Peak position
UK Indie Chart	3

== Release history ==
Region	Date	Label	Format	Catalog
United Kingdom	1985	K.422	LP	WISE 112
United States	1985	Wax Trax!	LP	WAX 012
