= Halt (album) =

Studio album by Foetus
- Released: December 25, 2025
- Studios: Self Immolation Studios, Brooklyn
- Genres: Experimental, contemporary classical
- Length: 56:59
- Label: Ectopic Ents
- Producer: J. G. Thirlwell

Foetus chronology
Soak (2013)	Halt (2025)

J. G. Thirlwell chronology
The Blue Eyes (2013)	Halt (2025)

Professional ratings
Review scores
Source	Rating
The Quietus	(favorable)

Halt is the eleventh and final studio album by Foetus, released on December 25, 2025, by Ectopic Ents. It was created over a span of 8 years and was the first Foetus album in 12 years.

== Track listing ==
All tracks are written by J. G. Thirlwell.

No.	Title	Length
1.	"Succulence"	5:40
2.	"Scurvy"	4:40
3.	"The World Is Broken"	6:17
4.	"Bang"	2:32
5.	"Harpoon"	8:08
6.	"Dead To Me"	3:25
7.	"Polar Vortex"	7:12
8.	"Crater"	5:38
9.	"Warships"	4:39
10.	"The Rabbit Hole"	3:41
11.	"Many Versions of Me"	6:19

== Personnel ==
- Foetus (J. G. Thirlwell) – composer, producer, vocals, instruments
- Brent McLachlan – engineering
- Leah Asher – violin (2, 11)
- Jake Baldwin – trumpets (3, 7, 10)
- Brian Chase – drums (1, 3, 8)
- Timo Ellis – guitar (3, 7)
- Simon Hanes – banjo (9), bass (9, 11), acoustic guitar (9)
- Brendon Randall Myers – guitar (3, 4, 10)
- Sami Stevens – vocals (3)
- Laura Wolf – additional voice (8)

== Release history ==
Region	Date	Label	Format	Catalog
United States	2025	Ectopic Ents	CD; digital download; streaming	ECT ENTS 046
