= Blink. (American band) =

American jazz fusion band

blink.
- Origin: Chicago, Illinois
- Genres: Jazz fusion
- Years active: 2006–present
- Label: Thirsty Ear Recordings
- Members: Jeff Greene; Quin Kirchner; Dave Miller; Greg Ward
- Website: www.thirstyear.com

blink. is a jazz fusion band from Chicago, Illinois. It was formed in 2006 when most of the original songs were written by the band's four members. Headed by bassist Jeff Greene, the band's prime motivation lies in the furtherance and expansion of fusion jazz. The full band consists of Jeff Greene: acoustic and electric basses, samples, harmonium; Quin Kirchner: drums, cymbals, percussion, glockenspiel; Dave Miller: electric guitar, sound effects; Greg Ward: alto sax. They have toured extensively across five continents, including North America, Asia, Europe, Africa, and South America. The band's compositions, which included free jazz and sound effects, have been commissioned and performed by the International Contemporary Ensemble.

== First studio album ==
blink. released their first studio album, entitled The Epidemic of Ideas, on August 26, 2008. According to data gathered by Chart, the album was played frequently on jazz radio stations in the United States from September to November 2008. The album was the sixth most played jazz album on KSPC for the week of October 27, 2008, and the eighth most played on CFRU-FM for the week of October 7, 2008. The Epidemic Of Ideas received the tenth most airplay of any jazz album on CJSW for the week ending October 6, 2008.

The album received positive reviews from music critics. Manny Theiner of the Pittsburgh Post-Gazette gave the album a "Very good" 3.5/4 rating, and commented: "The Epidemic of Ideas is an appropriate title for Blink's debut CD, as the exploration of forms, textures and motifs is almost never-ending. Successful tracks range from jazz-funk-rock 'Secret Weapon Part I', where guitarist Dave Miller blisters the fretboard Marc Ribot-style, to the glitchy, laptoppy electronics permeating 'Sources', from the off-kilter, odd-timed Miller guitar runs and Quin Kircher's percussion clatter on 'Displacement', to the comparatively meditative, gamelan-like feel of 'Glass'." AllMusic wrote in their review: "[The album] contains rather provocative investigations of vanguard jazz as it interacts with electronics, mutant funk, and even post-rock. Greene's compositions are rooted in space and edgy drama, and have wide-open spaces for various kinds of improvisations; rarely does one player occupy the solo space without another (or even two) engaging him directly." The album also received positive reviews from All About Jazz and The Phoenix's John Garelick, who gave the album a 3/4 rating and said, "Aside from the general aggressive, post-rock, post-jazz underground feel, there’s pretty tunes here, lots of slow, quiet parts, bebop flow, and even some walking bass. Another way to hear jazz." DownBeat magazine gave the album a four-star review in its January 2009 issue.
