= Ramrod (EP) =

EP by Scraping Foetus Off the Wheel
- Released: 1987
- Recorded: Milo and Paradise, London, England
- Genre: Industrial
- Length: 14:24
- Label: Self Immolation/Some Bizzare
- Producer: Clint Ruin

J. G. Thirlwell chronology
Bedrock (1987)	Ramrod (1987)	Stinkfist (1987)

Ramrod is an EP by Scraping Foetus Off the Wheel released by Self Immolation/Some Bizzare in 1987.

== Track listing ==
All tracks are written by J. G. Thirlwell.

Side one
No.	Title	Length
1.	"Ramrod"	6:09

Side two
No.	Title	Length
1.	"Boxhead"	3:45
2.	"Smut"	4:30

== Personnel ==
- Charles Gray – production, engineering
- Warne Livesy – production, engineering
- J. G. Thirlwell (as Clint Ruin) – instruments, production, mixing, illustrations

== Charts ==
Chart (1987)	Peak position
UK Indie Chart	5
