= Stumbo (song) =

Single by Wiseblood
- B-side: "Someone Drowned in My Pool"
- Released: November 1986
- Genre: Industrial
- Length: 6:35
- Label: K.422
- Songwriter(s): Roli Mosimann, J. G. Thirlwell
- Producer(s): Wiseblood

J. G. Thirlwell singles chronology
"Motorslug" (1985)	"Stumbo" (1986)

Stumbo is a song by Wiseblood, written by Roli Mosimann and J. G. Thirlwell. It was released as a single in November 1986 by K.422 and was included on the album Dirtdish.

== Formats and track listing ==
All songs written by Roli Mosimann and J. G. Thirlwell

UK 12" single (WISE 212)

1. "Stumbo" – 6:35
2. "Someone Drowned in My Pool" – 7:40

== Personnel ==
Adapted from the Motorslug liner notes.

Wiseblood

- Roli Mosimann – instruments
- J. G. Thirlwell – vocals, instruments, engineering

Production and additional personnel

- Wiseblood – production

== Charts ==
Chart (1986)	Peak position
UK Indie Chart	4

== Release history ==
Region	Date	Label	Format	Catalog
United Kingdom	1986	K.422	LP	WISE 212
United Kingdom	1986	Relativity	LP	88561-8137-1
