= Cisfinitum =

Russian post-industrial noise project

Cisfinitum is a post-industrial noise project from Moscow, Russia. It was started in the late 1990s by composer and musician Eugene Voronovsky and has drawn significant attention as one of the most uncommon and distinctive on the national experimental scene. Cisfinitum has an emotional sound lying within the boundaries of drone ambient and noise.

Cisfinitum's leader, Eugene Voronovsky, graduated from the Moscow State Conservatory as a professional violinist. In his music, he uses classical instruments such as the violin, the piano and percussion along with sounds considered "non-musical", such as a coffee grinder or dying man's breath, processed with analog and digital technologies. Cisfinitum can be called the industrial-ambient reading of academic music.

Cisfinitum is the sound of eternity. I've always wanted to create the music of Russian cosmos, music capable of expressing information about Russia that is impossible to reveal by means of words. They call this 'drone' overseas, but I prefer to define it 'metaphysical ambient, Eugene Voronovsky

Their releases have been issued on various labels, such as Entity, Insofar Vapour Bulk, Waystyx, Ewers Tonkunst, Electroshock, Mechanoise Labs and Monochrome Vision. They have performed live at festivals and other venues.

== Discography ==
- Untitled (1999)
- Landschaft (2000)
- V (2003)
- Bezdna (2005)
- Malgyl (2005)
- Music Of Light (2005)
- Coniunctio (2006)
- Devotio (2006)
- Tactio (2008)
- Nevmenosis (2008)
- Mental Travellers (with Rapoon, 2006)
- Ornaments ( with M.Ruiz / Alexei Borisov, 2007)
- Tactio (2007)
- [ANS]werk (with The [Law-Rah] Collective, 2011)
- Alchemicals (with First Human Ferro, 2012)
- The Bog (2013)
- Industriewerke 2002-2012 (2013)
- Metaprogramming (2013)
- Mayakovskiy (with Vladimir Epifantsev, 2013)
- O Vs 0 (2014)
- Live Earth (with Inna Echoes, 2015)
- Dissolutio (2015)
- Dolmen (2016)
- Memento (2018) (with Alexander Kibanov, Alexei Borisov, Alexei Bortnichuk, Hutopia)
- Monochrome (2018)
