= Custom Built for Capitalism =

EP by Foetus Over Frisco
- Released: April 1982
- Genre: Industrial
- Length: 24:07
- Label: Self Immolation
- Producer: J. G. Thirlwell

J. G. Thirlwell chronology
Deaf (1981)	Custom Built for Capitalism (1982)	Ache (1982)

Custom Built for Capitalism is an EP by Foetus Over Frisco, released in April 1982 by Self Immolation.

== Track listing ==
All tracks are written by J. G. Thirlwell.

Side one
No.	Title	Length
1.	"Custom Built for Capitalism"	10:56

Side two
No.	Title	Length
1.	"T.O. 45"	10:53
2.	"Birth Day"	2:18

== Personnel ==
Adapted from the Custom Built for Capitalism liner notes.

- J. G. Thirlwell (as Foetus Over Frisco) – vocals, instruments, production

== Release history ==
Region	Date	Label	Format	Catalog
United Kingdom	1982	Self Immolation	LP	WOMB WSUSC 12.5
