= Finely Honed Machine =

Single by Foetus Über Frisco
- B-side: "Sick Minutes (Unmutual)"
- Released: 1984
- Genre: Industrial
- Label: Self Immolation
- Songwriter(s): J. G. Thirlwell
- Producer(s): J. G. Thirlwell

J. G. Thirlwell singles chronology
"Calamity Crush" (1984)	"Finely Honed Machine" (1984)	"Motorslug" (1985)

Finely Honed Machine is a song by Foetus Über Frisco, written by J. G. Thirlwell. It was released as a single in 1984 by Self Immolation.

== Formats and track listing ==
All songs written by J. G. Thirlwell

UK 12" single (WOMB UNC 7.12)

1. "Finely Honed Machine"
2. "Sick Minutes (Unmutual)"

== Personnel ==
Adapted from the Finely Honed Machine liner notes.

- J. G. Thirlwell (as Foetus Über Frisco) – vocals, instruments, production, engineering (B)
- Charles Gray – engineering
- Warne Livesey – engineering (A)

== Charts ==
Chart (1985)	Peak position
UK Indie Chart	5

== Release history ==
Region	Date	Label	Format	Catalog
United Kingdom	1984	Self Immolation Some Bizzare Label	LP	WOMB UNC 7.12
