= Nail (album) =

Studio album by Scraping Foetus Off the Wheel
- Released: October 1, 1985
- Recorded: August 7, 1985
- Studios: Helstinki Jail, Livingston, Paradise and Wave Studios (London, UK)
- Genres: Industrial, industrial rock, avant-garde
- Length: 40:04
- Label: Self Immolation/Some Bizzare
- Producers: J. G. Thirlwell, Warne Livesey

J. G. Thirlwell chronology
Hole (1984)	Nail (1985)	Dirtdish (1987)

Nail is the fourth studio album by the J.G. Thirlwell solo project Foetus. It was released in October 1985 with the Foetus alias Scraping Foetus Off the Wheel, through record labels Self Immolation Records and Some Bizzare. The US release was issued by Homestead Records on November 18.

== Background ==
The album incorporates a variety of musical genres, including classical and industrial rock, and the lyrics are often esoteric. For example, the tempo and instrumentation in "Descent into the Inferno" is infrequent: the song's first half is sparse and percussive; in the latter stages the song gathers momentum and features synthesizers. "The Overture from Pigdom Come", a composition resembling a classical piece of music, is juxtaposed with perhaps the most brutal track on the album, "Private War", a track that features one minute of various grinding noises.

There are various obscure references within the songs, some more lucid than others. "The Throne of Agony" has the lyrics "Alas, poor Yorick, I knew me well", a paraphrase of a line from Shakespeare's Hamlet (Hamlet: "Alas, poor Yorick! I knew him, Horatio..."). The line "Turn on, tune in, drop out" in "DI-1-9026" refers to the Timothy Leary phrase. Jack and the Beanstalk is also referenced, with a variation of the chant "Fee, fie, foe, fum!" appearing in the final track.

== Critical reception ==
Professional ratings
Review scores
Source	Rating
AllMusic	4.5/5 stars
Sounds	5/5 stars

AllMusic called it "possibly the best Foetus album [...] the sheer range of this music is hard to believe."

== Track listing ==
All tracks are written by J. G. Thirlwell.

Side one
No.	Title	Length
1.	"Theme from Pigdom Come"	1:52
2.	"The Throne of Agony"	5:18
3.	"!"	0:04
4.	"Pigswill!"	6:13
5.	"Descent into the Inferno"	6:17

Side two
No.	Title	Length
1.	"Enter the Exterminator"	4:43
2.	"DI-1-9026"	4:40
3.	"The Overture from Pigdom Come"	3:01
4.	"Private War"	1:06
5.	"Anything (Viva!)"	6:50

Note: Some CD pressings place "The Throne of Agony" and "!" together on one track.

== Re-issue ==
In 2007, the album was re-released by Some Bizzare records in a digipack format with remastered audio and re-worked artwork.

== Accolades ==
Year	Publication	Country	Accolade	Rank
1995	Alternative Press	United States	"Top 99 of '85 to '95"	29
"*" denotes an unordered list.

== Personnel ==
- Warne Livesey – production, engineering
- J. G. Thirlwell (as Scraping Foetus Off The Wheel) – instruments, production, illustrations
- Tim Young – mastering

== Charts ==
Chart (1985)	Peak position
UK Indie Chart	1
