= Volvox Turbo =

Studio album by Manorexia
- Released: June 2001
- Recorded: Self Immolation Studios, Brooklyn, New York
- Genre: Industrial
- Length: 63:44
- Label: Ectopic Ents
- Producer: J. G. Thirlwell

Manorexia chronology
Volvox Turbo (2001)	The Radiolarian Ooze (2002)

J. G. Thirlwell chronology
Flow (2001)	Volvox Turbo (2001)	Blow (2001)

Volvox Turbo is the debut album from Manorexia. It was released in 2001 by Ectopic Ents, and is catalog #ECT ENTS 021.

Volvox Turbo was a limited edition album self-distributed by J. G. Thirlwell. It was sold exclusively at the Official Foetus Website and at Foetus shows during the tour for Flow.

== Track listing ==
All tracks are written by J. G. Thirlwell.

No.	Title	Length
1.	"The Hardened Artery"	6:18
2.	"Ice on the Equator"	3:35
3.	"Zithromax Jitters"	3:12
4.	"Impedimenta"	2:31
5.	"A Womb Is Waiting"	9:28
6.	"Helicobra"	2:16
7.	"Tiki Envy"	1:41
8.	"Toxodon Mourning"	6:50
9.	"The Cringe Factory"	3:05
10.	"Melting at the Temple"	2:27
11.	"Tongue of Uncertainty"	3:42
12.	"Bruxism"	6:15
13.	"Tubercular Bells"	3:11
14.	"Tranque"	9:13

== Personnel ==
- Drew Anderson – mastering
- Steve Schwartz – art direction
- J. G. Thirlwell – instruments, arrangements, production
