= Dinoflagellate Blooms =

Studio album by Manorexia
- Released: June 11, 2011
- Recorded: Self Immolation Studios, Brooklyn, New York
- Genre: Modern classical
- Length: 61:45
- Label: Ectopic Ents
- Producer: J. G. Thirlwell

Manorexia chronology
The Mesopelagic Waters (2010)	Dinoflagellate Blooms (2011)

J. G. Thirlwell chronology
Hide (2010)	Dinoflagellate Blooms (2011)	Soak (2013)

Dinoflagellate Blooms is the fourth studio album that J. G. Thirlwell has issued under the pseudonym Manorexia. It was released on June 11, 2011 by Ectopic Ents. The Wire gave the record a glowing review, saying "it's a hugely satisfying record, representing half a decade of concentrated work but also a fine unity of purpose."

== Track listing ==
All music is composed by J. G. Thirlwell.

No.	Title	Length
1.	"Cryogenics"	3:18
2.	"Anabiosis"	8:43
3.	"Ten Ton Shadow"	4:00
4.	"Krzystl"	10:15
5.	"A Plastic Island in the Pacific"	7:38
6.	"Hydrofrack"	2:36
7.	"The Perfect Patsy"	5:29
8.	"Hoarse Platitudes"	0:23
9.	"Vika"	4:22
10.	"Kinaesthesia"	8:46
11.	"Struck"	6:15

== Personnel ==
- Heung-Heung Chin – art direction
- Scott Hull – mastering
- J. G. Thirlwell – instruments, producer, design

== Release history ==
Region	Date	Label	Format	Catalog
United States	2011	Ectopic Ents	CD	ECT ENTS 034
