= Calamity Crush =

Single by Foetus Art Terrorism
- B-side: "Catastrophe Crunch"
- Released: October 1984
- Recorded: March – April 1984 at Wave Studios, Hoxton, London
- Genre: Industrial
- Label: Some Bizzare; Self Immolation
- Songwriter(s): J. G. Thirlwell
- Producer(s): J. G. Thirlwell

J. G. Thirlwell singles chronology
| "Tell Me, What Is the Bane of Your Life" (1982) | "Calamity Crush" (1984) | "Finely Honed Machine" (1984) |

Calamity Crush is a song by Foetus Art Terrorism, written by J. G. Thirlwell. It was released as a single in October 1984 by Self Immolation.

== Formats and track listing ==
All songs written by J. G. Thirlwell

UK 12" single (WOMB FAT 11.12)

1. "Calamity Crush"
2. "Catastrophe Crunch"

== Personnel ==
Adapted from the Calamity Crush

- J. G. Thirlwell (as Foetus Art Terrorism) – vocals, instruments, musical arrangement, record producer
- Warne Livesey – production

== Charts ==
| Chart (1984) | Peak position |
|---|---|
| UK Indie Chart | 4 |

== Release history ==
| Region | Date | Label | Format | Catalog |
|---|---|---|---|---|
| United Kingdom | 1984 | Some Bizzare Label Self Immolation | LP | WOMB FAT 11.12 |
| Japan | 1984 | Nippon Columbia Co., Ltd. | LP | YW-7423-AX |
