= The Radiolarian Ooze =

Studio album by Manorexia
- Released: October 2002
- Recorded: Self Immolation Studios, Brooklyn, New York
- Genre: Modern classical
- Length: 61:37
- Label: Ectopic Ents
- Producer: J. G. Thirlwell

Manorexia chronology
Volvox Turbo (2001)	The Radiolarian Ooze (2002)	The Mesopelagic Waters (2010)

J. G. Thirlwell chronology
Ectopia (2002)	The Radiolarian Ooze (2002)	(not adam) (2004)

Professional ratings
Review scores
Source	Rating
Kerrang!	4/5 stars
Uncut	2/5 stars

The Radiolarian Ooze is the second album from Manorexia, it was released in 2002 by Ectopic Ents. Like its predecessor, Volvox Turbo, The Radiolarian Ooze is self-distributed by J. G. Thirlwell and sold exclusively at the Official Foetus Website.

== Track listing ==
All tracks are written by J. G. Thirlwell.

No.	Title	Length
1.	"Planet of the Aches"	3:02
2.	"The Harpoon Jockey"	3:34
3.	"Backwards from "Z""	2:47
4.	"Confessions of Zsolt Vadaszffy"	3:03
5.	"Fluorescent Radiation"	4:48
6.	"Canaries in the Mineshaft"	4:04
7.	"The Edison Medicine"	1:15
8.	"Ataxia"	11:54
9.	"Chloe Don't Know I'm Alive"	8:20
10.	"Cosmos Brutile"	6:09
11.	"Armadillo Stance"	5:04
12.	"Self Inflicted Concussions... (Suffered as a Result of Anguish During the Course of the Search for the Airplane Girl... or Someone Just Like Her)"	7:30

== Personnel ==
- Quentin Jennings – mastering
- J. G. Thirlwell – instruments, arrangements, production, recording, illustrations, design
