= Steroid Maximus =

Australian musical project

Steroid Maximus is a musical project led by Australian composer J.G. Thirlwell. Mostly instrumental music, Steroid Maximus contains elements of jazz, big band, avant-garde, soundtrack and exotica styles.

Thirlwell is best known for his rock-oriented main band, Foetus.

== History ==
Following the recording of Foetus Interruptus' Thaw (1988) J.G. Thirlwell felt that too many instrumental songs were making their way onto Foetus albums. Thirlwell's future work was split between two distinct entities: songs with lead vocals were released under the Foetus moniker, and instrumental works were released as Steroid Maximus.

The official debut of Steroid Maximus came in 1990 with the release of the single "Volgarity" on a flexi disc compilation. The following year saw the release of the ¡Quilombo! LP, Steroid Maximus' first album written by Thirlwell with guest performances by Lucy Hamilton, Hahn Rowe, Away, and Raymond Watts.

Steroid Maximus' second album, Gondwanaland, was released in 1992. In addition to further collaboration with Raymond Watts on 6 of the 14 tracks, Thirlwell wrote, recorded and produced the second effort. Gondwanaland also contained the "Volgarity" single and a cover of Raymond Scott's "Powerhouse"—a favorite soundtrack of many classic Looney Tunes shorts—which was originally released by Thirlwell under his Garage Monsters moniker.

== Recent ==
After a decade-long hiatus, Thirlwell revived his Steroid Maximus project in 2001 (without Watts). Ectopia was recorded and released as the third album for Mike Patton's Ipecac label in 2002. Steroid Maximus made its live debut in Los Angeles in 2003, facilitated by a commission from UCLA. Thirlwell rearranged the music for an 18-piece orchestra, with string and brass section. This included trumpeter Steven Bernstein, with whom he had worked with on the Foetus album Gash. Conducted by Thirlwell, the ensemble included musicians Nels Cline, DJ Bonebrake and Bruce Fowler. He has since performed with French and Austrian versions of this ensemble, and in 2005 extended the repertoire to add a set of Foetus material for the Donaufestival.

Thirlwell has continued and expanded his Steroid Maximus stylings in his scoring work for the cartoon The Venture Bros.

== Discography ==
- ¡Quilombo! (1991)
- Gondwanaland (1992)
- Ectopia (2002)

== See also ==
- J. G. Thirlwell
- Raymond Watts
- Manorexia
