= Gondwanaland (Steroid Maximus album) =

Studio album by Steroid Maximus
- Released: December 1992
- Recorded: Self Immolation Studios, Brooklyn (Summer 1989–Summer 1990)
- Genre: Jazz, avant garde
- Length: 54:52
- Label: Big Cat
- Producer: J. G. Thirlwell

J. G. Thirlwell chronology
Male (1992)	Gondwanaland (1992)	Vice Squad Dick (1994)

Professional ratings
Review scores
Source	Rating
AllMusic	(unrated)

Gondwanaland is an album from Steroid Maximus. It was released in 1992 by Big Cat Records.

Gondwanaland is Ectopic Entertainment #ECT ENTS 003.

The album is the second Steroid Maximus album of instrumental soundtrack music to an imaginary film. Ira Robbins of Trouser Press called the music "stunning in its mischievous diversion of traditional concepts", describing the music as "Wagnerian orchestration, exotic ethnic elements, blaring big-band swing, continental drift and found-sound constructions".

Reviews:

- John Chedsey (30 January 2000). "Satan Stole My Teddy Bear". Archived from the original on 9 April 2008. Alt URL
- College Music Journal text at foetus.org
- Sputnik Music review

== Track listing ==
1. "¡Quilombo!" (J. G. Thirlwell / Raymond Watts) – 4:22
2. "Radio Raheem" (Thirlwell / Watts) – 3:25
3. "First Movement: The Trojan Hearse" (Thirlwell / Watts) – 2:38
4. "Second Movement: The Auctioneer of Souls" (Thirlwell / Watts) – 4:36
5. "Third Movement: Crawling Goliath" (Thirlwell / Watts) – 3:42
6. "Fourth Movement: Erupture" (Thirlwell / Watts) – 3:13
7. "Life in the Greenhouse Effect" (Thirlwell / Lucy Hamilton) – 5:52
8. "I Will Love You Always (Wild Irish Rose)" (Thirlwell / Don Flemming) – 6:14
9. "Cross Double Cross" (Thirlwell / Mark Cunningham) – 4:08
10. "Destino Matar" (Thirlwell / Away) – 3:32
11. "Volgarity" (Thirlwell) – 2:36
12. "Öl (Kwik-Lube)" (Thirlwell / Roli Mosimann) – 1:56
13. "Powerhouse!" (Raymond Scott) – 4:06
14. "Homeo" (Thirlwell / Away) – 2:34
- Tracks 3–6 are collectively titled "The Bowel of Beelzebub: A Symphony in Four Movements."
- "¡Quilombo!" and "Life in the Greenhouse Effect" are taken from ¡Quilombo!.
- "Powerhouse!" originally released in 1990 by Thirlwell's Garage Monsters project.

== Personnel and production ==
- J. G. Thirlwell – Performance, production, arrangements, engineering, mixing
- Raymond Watts – Featured (1–6)
- Lucy Hamilton – Featured (7)
- Don Flemming – Featured (8)
- Mark Cunningham – Featured (9)
- Away – Featured (10, 14)
- Roli Mosimann – Featured (12)
- The Pizz and Buttstain – Featured (13)
- Lin Culbertson – Flute (1)
- Hahn Rowe – Violin (9)
