= The Blue Eyes =

Soundtrack album by J. G. Thirlwell
- Released: December 3, 2013
- Recorded: 2011 at Self Immolation Studios, Brooklyn, NY
- Genre: Modern classical
- Length: 45:13
- Label: Ectopic Ents
- Producer: J. G. Thirlwell

J. G. Thirlwell chronology
Soak (2013)	The Blue Eyes (2013)	Halt (2025)

Professional ratings
Review scores
Source	Rating
Pitchfork	(6.2/10)

The Blue Eyes is a 2013 musical score by Australian composer J. G. Thirlwell for the film of the same name, written and directed by Eva Aridjis. Recorded in January 2011, the album was released on December 3, 2013, by Ectopic Ents. The score marks a musical departure for Thirlwell, exhibiting a more sombre tone compared to his previous soundtrack work for The Venture Bros.

== Reception ==
The score received mixed critical reviews. In writing for The Wire, Clive Bell felt that while the music was at times effectively terrifying, it too often felt recycled and lacking in originality. Marc Masters of Pitchfork gave the album 6.2 out of 10, describing the score as typical and concluding that it "is too conventionally filmic to provide a full experience by itself. It feels more in service of someone else's images than capable of inspiring them on its own."

== Track listing ==
All tracks are written by J. G. Thirlwell.

No.	Title	Length
1.	"Blue Eyes" (opening)	4:08
2.	"Moths"	0:28
3.	"Witchmarket"	2:26
4.	"Later"	1:27
5.	"The Temple"	3:47
6.	"Courtyard Dogs"	1:33
7.	"Bracelet"	0:24
8.	"Hanging Curse"	4:22
9.	"Author"	1:19
10.	"Search"	1:05
11.	"Muted World"	1:36
12.	"Closet Eyes"	0:58
13.	"VW"	1:12
14.	"Long Bus"	1:13
15.	"Urchin"	2:52
16.	"Dogs Eye View"	0:12
17.	"Mountain Trail"	4:14
18.	"The Shack"	6:14
19.	"Stabber"	0:18
20.	"Post Alles"	1:23
21.	"Blue Eyes" (end)	1:29
22.	"Blue Eyes" (closing)	2:22

== Personnel ==
Musicians

- Isabel Castelvi – cello
- James Ilgenfritz – contrabass
- Nathan Koci – French horn
- Marcus Rojas – bass trombone, tuba
- J. G. Thirlwell – instruments, producer, design
- Karen Waltuch – violin, viola

Technical personnel

- Heung-Heung Chin – art direction
- Marietta Davis – photography
- Scott Hull – mastering

== Release history ==
Region	Date	Label	Format	Catalog
United States	2013	Ectopic Ents	CD	ECT ENTS 036
