= Gash (Foetus album) =

Studio album by Foetus
- Released: 15 April 1995
- Recorded: Unique Studios (New York City)
- Genre: Industrial
- Length: 62:52
- Label: Sony/Columbia
- Producer: J. G. Thirlwell

J. G. Thirlwell chronology
Vice Squad Dick (1994)	Gash (1995)	Null (1995)

Professional ratings
Review scores
Source	Rating
AllMusic	4/5 stars
Q	4/5 stars

Gash is the sixth studio album by Foetus, released in 1995 by Sony/Columbia. Gash is the only Foetus album to appear on a major label and their most widely distributed, with releases in North America, Europe and Japan. The album spent 10 weeks on the CMJ Radio Top 150, peaking at No. 48. Gash is Columbia Records #CK 66461.

== Track listing ==
All tracks are written by J. G. Thirlwell.

No.	Title	Length
1.	"Mortgage"	6:19
2.	"Mighty Whity"	3:56
3.	"Friend or Foe"	4:27
4.	"Hammer Falls"	5:34
5.	"Downfall"	2:58
6.	"Take It Outside Godboy"	4:54
7.	"Verklemmt"	4:45
8.	"They Are Not So True"	3:34
9.	"Slung"	11:21
10.	"Steal Your Life Away"	4:42
11.	"Mutapump"	5:33
12.	"See Ya Later"	4:48

== Personnel ==
- J. G. Thirlwell – all instruments and vocals, except:
- Tod Ashley – bass (2, 3, 4, 5, 6, 11, 12)
- Vinnie Signorelli – drums (5, 9)
- Marc Ribot – guitar (3, 9, 12)
- Marcellus Hall – harmonica (3)
- Steve Bernstein – trumpet (2, 5, 6, 11, 12)
- The Heresey Horns – horns (2, 4, 9)

=== Production ===
- J. G. Thirlwell – production, composition, arrangements, digital artwork concept and design
- Rob "Rok" Sutton – engineering
- Howie Weinberg – mastering
- Steve Bernstein – heresy horn arrangements
- Brian Wallace – art direction
- Alex Winter – photography
- Adam Sanders – computer imaging
- Richard White – graphic artist
