= Brian Emrich =

- Born: April 14, 1961 (age 65); Burnt Hills, New York, U.S.
- Occupations: Sound designer and composer
- Years active: 1998–present

Brian Emrich (born April 14, 1961) is a sound designer, composer, and musician. His sound design credits include the films π, Requiem for a Dream, One Hour Photo and Phone Booth. He records music under the moniker Psilonaut, and has collaborated with Foetus and Congo Norvell.

He was nominated at the Broadcast Critic Awards for his work on the film Black Swan.
