= Thirsty Ear Recordings =

American independent record label

- Founded: 1977
- Distributor: Alternative Distribution Alliance
- Genre: Jazz, hip-hop, funk
- Country of origin: U.S.
- Location: Norwalk, Connecticut
- Official website: www.thirstyear.com

Thirsty Ear Recordings is an American independent record label. It was founded in the late 1970s as a marketing company for the then-unnamed alternative music field, and expanded to issue its own records in 1990.

Thirsty Ear came to prominence in the mid-1990s with a series of CD reissues of early industrial albums by artists such as Foetus, Einstürzende Neubauten, Marc Almond, Swans, and Test Dept. The label also released new albums by alternative rock bands such as Baby Ray, Madder Rose, and The Church. Foetus would remain on the label, recording original music on Thirsty Ear through 2001.

More recently, Thirsty Ear has released jazz albums as part of its Blue Series. Enlisting Matthew Shipp as the artistic director. The Blue Series has released albums by artists such as Shipp, William Parker, Charlie Hunter and Tim Berne, while also inviting electronica artists DJ Spooky, Meat Beat Manifesto, and Spring Heel Jack, hip-hoppers El-P and Antipop Consortium, and even Slayer drummer Dave Lombardo.

== Roster ==
- Antipop Consortium
- Baby Ray
- Beans
- Tim Berne
- Big Satan
- blink.
- Guillermo E. Brown
- Roy Campbell
- DJ Spooky
- DJ Wally
- Mark Eitzel
- El-P
- Peter Evans
- Free Form Funky Freqs
- The Free Zen Society
- The Gang Font
- Mary Halvorson and Jessica Pavone
- Charlie Hunter and Bobby Previte as Groundtruther
- Albert King
- KTU
- Mike Ladd
- Dave Lombardo
- Mat Maneri
- Meat Beat Manifesto
- Nils Petter Molvaer
- Ben Neill
- William Parker
- Daniel Bernard Roumain
- Carl Hancock Rux
- Scanner with The Post Modern Jazz Quartet
- Sexmob
- Matthew Shipp
- Sigmatropic
- Spring Heel Jack
- Craig Taborn
- Visionfest
- David S. Ware
- Pete M. Wyer
- Vernon Reid and DJ Logic are the Yohimbe Brothers
- Weasel Walter
- Eri Yamamoto

== See also ==
- List of record labels
