= Foetus (band) =

Australian music project

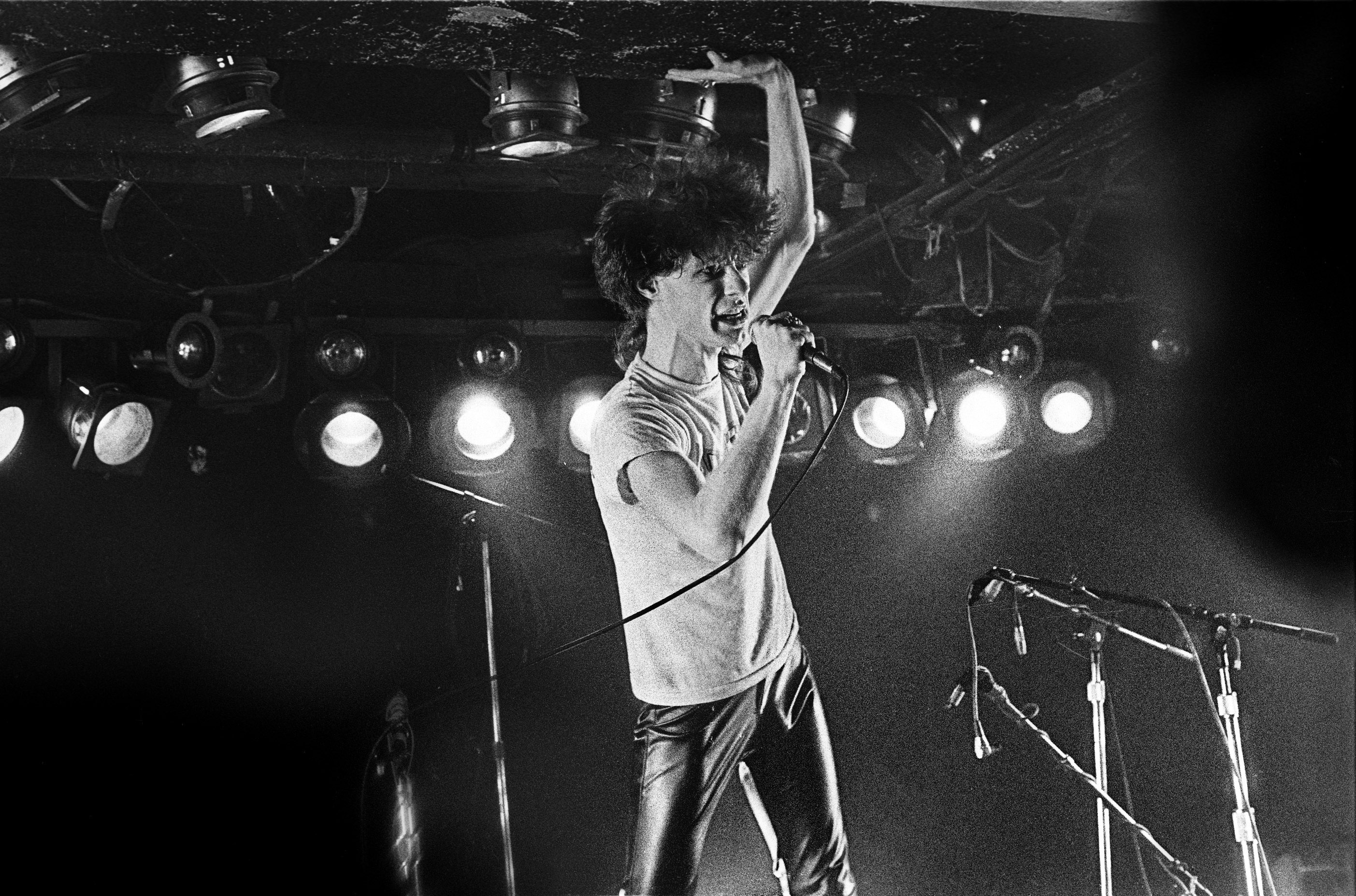
- Thirlwell singing on stage at the Rathskeller in Boston, 1985

Background information
- Also known as: Foetus Under Glass; You've Got Foetus on Your Breath; Scraping Foetus Off the Wheel; Foetus Interruptus; Various others
- Origin: London, England
- Genres: Post-punk, experimental, avant-garde, industrial
- Years active: 1981–present
- Labels: Thirsty Ear; Some Bizzare; Entopic Entertainment; Self Immolation
- Members: JG Thirlwell
- Website: foetus.org

Foetus is a solo musical project of Australian musician JG Thirlwell. The project has had many similar names, each including the word 'Foetus'.^{note} The "members" of the project are aliases of Thirlwell; they include Frank Want, Phillip Toss, and Clint Ruin. Thirlwell occasionally collaborates with other artists, but does not consider them to be members of Foetus.

In 1981, after the breakup of PragVEC, Thirlwell started his own solo music project under the name of 'Foetus Under Glass'. After the album Thaw, Thirlwell stopped changing the name; thereafter it remained simply 'Foetus'.

In November 1983, Foetus undertook a tour with Marc Almond, Nick Cave and Lydia Lunch in the quickly dissolved 'partnership' known as The Immaculate Consumptive. He has also appeared on albums recorded by The The, Einstürzende Neubauten, Nurse With Wound and Anne Hogan.

In October 1985, Thirlwell made the album Nail, which became the most popular Foetus album of all time.

Gash was issued in 1995, which led to acknowledgment from music journalists of Foetus's role in the development of industrial music.

== Conceptual themes ==
All full-length Foetus album titles are four-letter, one-syllable words, often with multiple connotations.

The artwork of Foetus releases shows a deliberate progression of colour: the earliest releases are black-and-white, with the addition of red on the Deaf album, and further addition of yellow on Nail. Full-colour art was introduced on Gash. Beginning with Flow, the artwork of primary albums reverted to black/white/red, although other releases continue in full colour.

== Discography ==
Album title	Year of release	Band name
Deaf	1981	You've Got Foetus on Your Breath
Ache	1982	You've Got Foetus on Your Breath
Hole	1984	Scraping Foetus Off the Wheel
Nail	1985	Scraping Foetus Off the Wheel
Thaw	1988	Foetus Interruptus
Gash	1995	Foetus
Flow	2001	Foetus
Love	2005	Foetus
Hide	2010	Foetus
Soak	2013	Foetus
Halt	2025	Foetus

== Notes ==
^a Foetus in Your Bed (1981), You've Got Foetus on Your Breath (1981), Jim Foetus and the Transvestites from Hell (1983), Scraping Foetus Off the Wheel (1984), The Foetus of Excellence (1985), Foetus Über Alles (1985), Foetus Flesh (1985), Foetus on the Beach (1985), Foetus Interruptus (1988), Foetus Eruptus (1989), Foetus (1995), The Foetus Symphony Orchestra (1997), Foetus Under Glass, Phillip & His Foetus Vibrations, Foetus Over Frisco, Foetus Art Terrorism, Foetus Über Frisco, The Foetus All Nude Revue, Foetus, Inc., Foetus Corruptus, Foetus in Excelsis Corruptus Deluxe
