= JG Thirlwell =

Australian composer, producer and musician

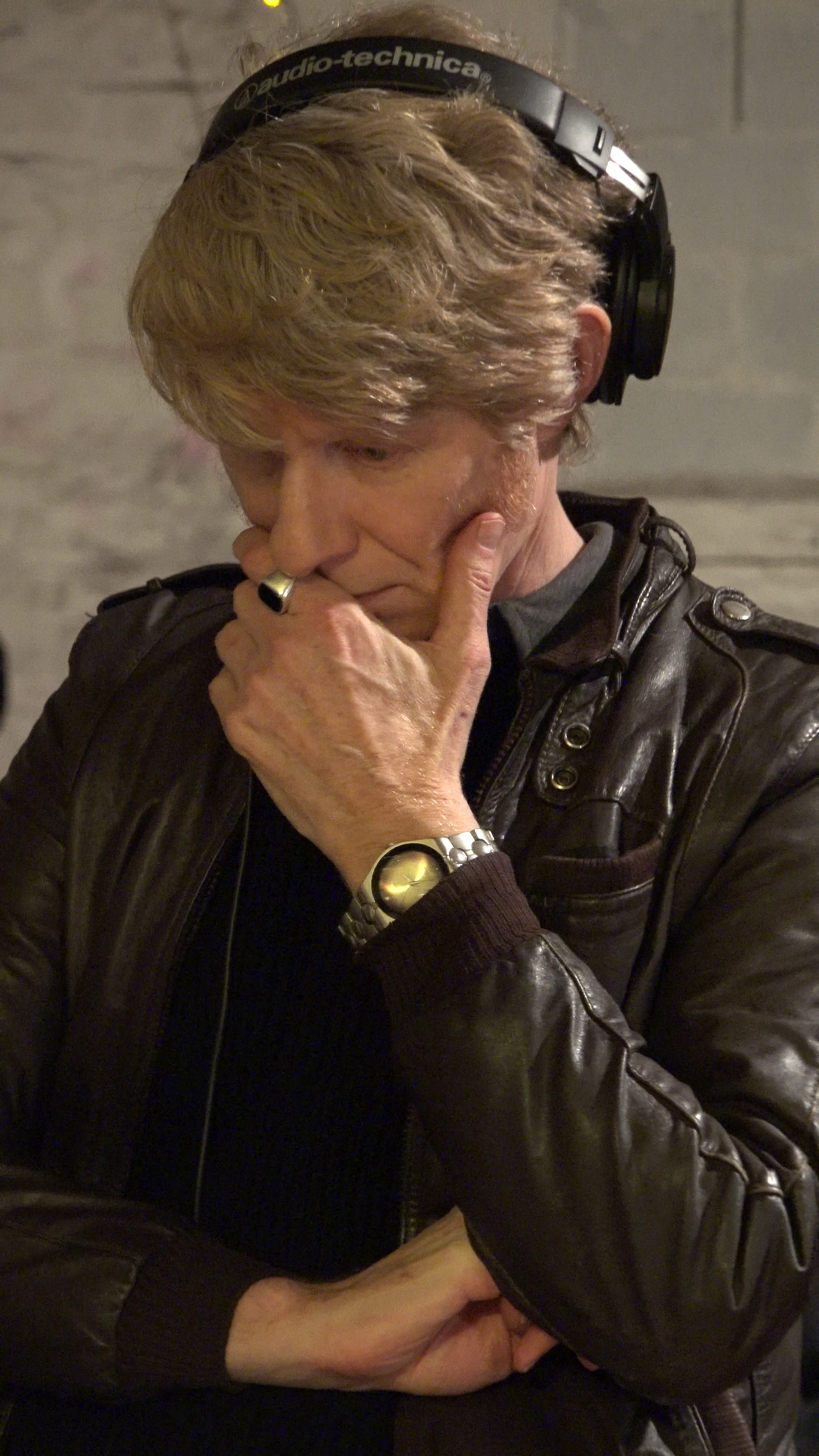
- Thirlwell recording at BC Studios in 2016

Background information
- Also known as: Clint Ruin; Frank Want; Foetus
- Born: James George Thirlwell; 29 January 1960 (age 66); Melbourne, Australia
- Genres: Industrial; post-punk; trip hop; big band
- Occupations: Composer; songwriter; musician
- Years active: 1980–present
- Labels: Self Immolation; Big Cat; Ectopic Ents; Ipecac Recordings; Williams Street; Tzadik
- Website: foetus.org

James George Thirlwell (born 29 January 1960), styled as JG Thirlwell and also known as Clint Ruin, Frank Want, and Foetus, among other pseudonyms, is an Australian musician, composer, and record producer known for juxtaposing a variety of different musical styles.

== Life and career ==
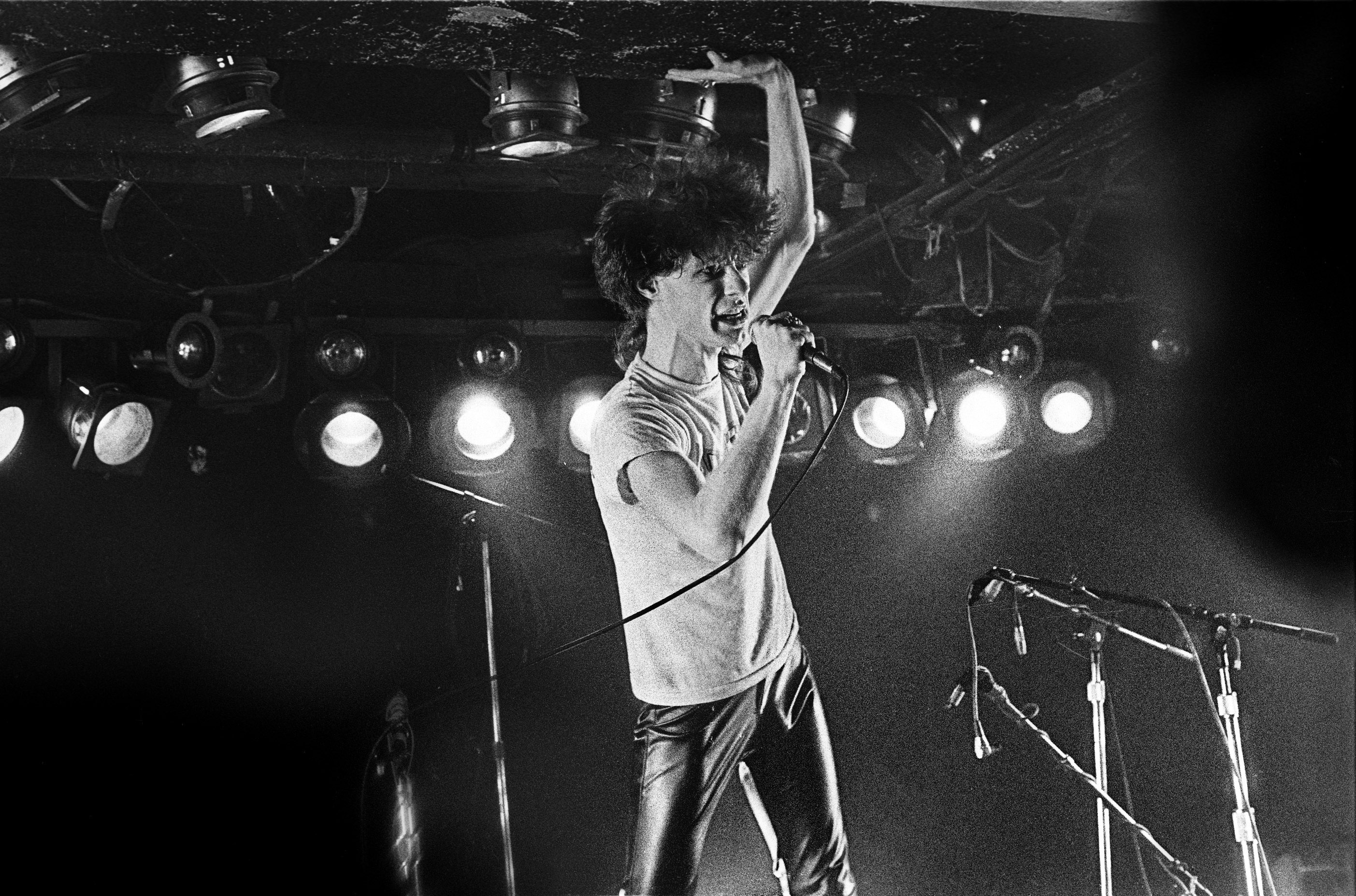
Thirlwell singing at the Rathskeller in Boston, 1985

Thirlwell was born in Melbourne, Australia. He briefly studied fine art at Melbourne State College (now part of the University of Melbourne) before moving in 1978 to London, England, where he played with the post-punk band prag VEC and formed the first of his numerous musical projects, Foetus. In the 1980s, under the pseudonyms Clint Ruin and Frank Want, he contributed to various releases by Nurse with Wound, Marc Almond, The The and Nick Cave and the Bad Seeds. He co-wrote "Wings Off Flies" on From Her to Eternity, the first Bad Seeds album. Longtime Nick Cave associate Mick Harvey would later report that Thirlwell's time in the band was cut short, in part, by a clash between Thirlwell's highly structured studio routine as contrasted with Cave and the Bad Seeds' then habit of "shambling through it" while recording.

Thirlwell released his first 7-inch single, OKFM/Spite Your Face, in 1981, on his own Self-Immolation record label in his first incarnation as Foetus. Over the next few years, he would release two more singles, a 12" EP, and four full-length albums, Deaf, Ache, Hole and Nail (Some Bizzare Records). After visiting the United States during a live stint with the Immaculate Consumptive (Lydia Lunch, Nick Cave and Marc Almond), Thirlwell settled in New York City, United States, where he is still based. Since his move he has released several singles, fourteen EPs (including Stinkfist with fellow New York artist Lydia Lunch), and seventeen full-length albums.

In addition to being a prolific artist in his own right, Thirlwell has remixed and produced numerous pieces for artists including Faith No More, Nine Inch Nails, Pantera, Jon Spencer Blues Explosion, The The, Zola Jesus, Front 242, and Swans. He has also done voice-over work for MTV and other entities.

Since 2000, Thirlwell has become more active as a composer, having written commissions for Bang on a Can, League of Electronic Musical Urban Robots, and the Kronos Quartet, and scoring cartoons The Venture Bros. for Adult Swim and Archer for FX. His most recent project was scoring the John Hodgman and David Rees cartoon detective show Dicktown.

He also revived his primary instrumental project, Steroid Maximus, and initiated a more experimental instrumental project in Manorexia. He continues to write and perform regularly as a solo artist and with various ensembles. He is also a member of the freq_out sound art collective, and has created solo sound installations in Kaliningrad, Santarcangelo and Vienna.

=== Music ===
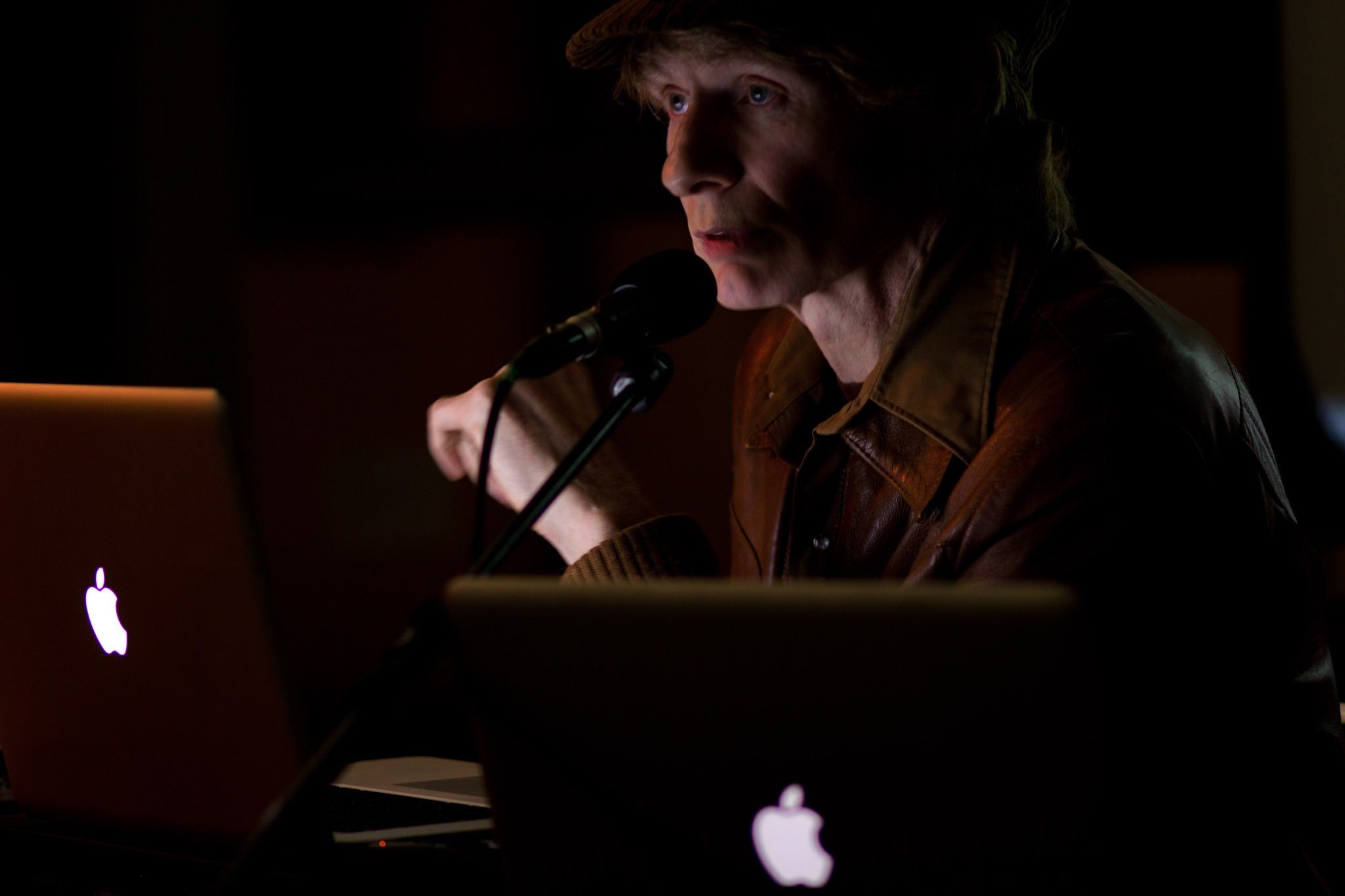
Thirlwell at Moderna Museet, Stockholm

Thirlwell's music—released under his various project names of Foetus, Wiseblood, Steroid Maximus, Baby Zizanie, Manorexia and others—includes elements of 20th-century classical music, noise, big band, Americana, jazz, punk rock, African and Cuban percussion, and epic/horror film soundtracks. Much of Thirlwell's aural output is built on a percussive, rock music-type structure, though to call it rock music would be inaccurate. His music employs elements of many genres: with an often frenzied aesthetic, Thirlwell's music combines percussion, strings, distortion, brass, electric guitars, electronic sounds and voice. Recurring lyrical themes include destruction, persecution, anxiety, abuse, incest, masochism, angst, self-destruction, self-abuse, lust, prejudice, murder, failure and machismo, often expressed using American colloquialism and black humour.

=== Musical projects ===
- Foetus: Thirlwell's main project. From 1981's single "OKFM" until 2013's "Soak", most Foetus songs featured lead vocals. Though popularly known as simply "Foetus", Thirlwell released albums under diverse variations of the name, including: Foetus Art Terrorism; Foetus Über Frisco; Foetus Corruptus; Foetus In Excelsis Corruptus Deluxe; Foetus Inc.; Foetus Interruptus; Foetus Over Frisco; Foetus Under Glass; Philip and His Foetus Vibrations; Scraping Foetus Off the Wheel; The Foetus All-Nude Revue; The Foetus of Excellence; The Foetus Symphony Orchestra; and You've Got Foetus On Your Breath.
- Steroid Maximus: Primary instrumental project. Collaboration with Raymond Watts.
- Manorexia: Experimental instrumental project.
- Wiseblood: Collaboration with Roli Mosimann.
- Flesh Volcano: Collaboration with Marc Almond.
- Baby Zizanie: Collaboration with Jim Coleman.
- Hydroze Plus: Collaboration with Electronicat.
- Garage Monsters: Collaboration with skater artist the P!zz. (Sympathy for the Record Industry)
- The Immaculate Consumptive: Touring ensemble with Lydia Lunch, Nick Cave, and Marc Almond
- The Venture Bros.: Musical score by Thirlwell.
- Archer: Musical score by Thirlwell from Season 7 onwards.
- Xordox: Thirlwell's new instrumental project.
- Dicktown: Musical score by Thirlwell. 2020 animated show with David Rees and John Hodgman

== Aliases ==
Throughout the span of his career, Thirlwell has toyed with his own identity by releasing music in the guise of numerous alter egos. During the earliest phases of his recording, Thirlwell's "groups" were composed of a plethora of fictional characters: Foetus Under Glass supposedly consisted of Frank Want, Phillip Toss and two Brazilian statistics collectors; Scraping Foetus off the Wheel was claimed to be the work of Want and Clint Ruin. Furthering the confusion, Thirlwell adopted these personas outside of his own recordings; for example, Frank Want can be found on The The's Soul Mining and on releases by Orange Juice, with whom he appeared on Top of the Pops.

The persona of Clint Ruin was particularly notable in this context; during the mid-1980s and early 1990s Thirlwell exclusively went by this pseudonym, even conducting interviews as Ruin. As Ruin, Thirlwell was a member of Wiseblood with Roli Mosimann and Flesh Volcano with Marc Almond. He also recorded two collaborative EPs with Lydia Lunch, and starred in and scored films by Richard Kern under the Ruin alias. Ruin is also credited on numerous releases for a variety of roles with Boss Hog, Coil, Fur Bible, Annie Hogan, Nurse with Wound, Pigface, Sonic Youth, Workdogs and others.

This practice seems to have been discontinued since 1995, and "JG Thirlwell" is credited on all subsequent musical recordings.
