= IAU (1976) System of Astronomical Constants =

System of astronomical constants

The International Astronomical Union at its 16th General Assembly in Grenoble in 1976, accepted Resolution No. 1 regarding a "New System of Astronomical Constants" recommended for reduction of astronomical observations, and for computation of ephemerides. It superseded the IAU's previous recommendations of 1964 (see IAU (1964) System of Astronomical Constants), became in effect in the Astronomical Almanac from 1984 onward, and remained in use until the introduction of the IAU (2009) System of Astronomical Constants. In 1994 the IAU recognized that the parameters became outdated, but retained the 1976 set for sake of continuity and also recommended to start maintaining a set of "current best estimates". This "sub group for numerical standards" had published a list, which included new constants (like those for relativistic time scales).

The system of constants was prepared by Commission 4 on ephemerides led by P. Kenneth Seidelmann after whom asteroid 3217 Seidelmann is named.

At the time, a new standard epoch (J2000.0) was accepted; followed later by a new reference system with fundamental catalogue (FK5), and expressions for precession of the equinoxes, and in 1979 by new expressions for the relation between Universal Time and sidereal time, and in 1979 and 1980 by a theory of nutation. There were no reliable rotation elements for most planets, but a joint working group on Cartographic Coordinates and Rotational Elements was installed to compile recommended values.

== Units ==
The IAU(1976) system is based on the astronomical system of units:

- The astronomical unit of time is the day (D) of 86,400 SI seconds, which is close to the mean solar day of civil clock time.
- The astronomical unit of mass is the mass of the Sun (S).
- The astronomical unit of length is known as the astronomical unit (A or au), which in the IAU(1976) system is defined as the length for which the gravitational constant, more specifically the Gaussian gravitational constant k expressed in the astronomical units (i.e., k^{2} has units A^{3}S^{−1}D^{−2}), takes the value of 0.017 202 098 95. This astronomical unit is approximately the mean distance between the Earth and the Sun. The value of k is the angular velocity in radians per day (i.e. the daily mean motion) of an infinitesimally small mass that moves around the Sun in a circular orbit at a distance of 1 AU.

== Table of constants ==
Number	Quantity	Symbol	Value	Unit	Relative uncertainty	Ref.
Defining Constants
1	Gaussian gravitational constant	k	0.017 202 098 95	A^{3/2}S^{−1/2}D^{−1}	defined	
Primary Constants
2	Speed of light	c	299 792 458 ±1.2	m s^{−1}	4×10^{−9}	
3	light time for unit distance	τ_{A}	499.004 782 ±0.000 002	s	4×10^{−9}	
4	equatorial radius for Earth	a_{e}	6 378 140 ±5	m	8×10^{−7}	
5	dynamical form-factor for Earth	J_{2}	(108 263 ±1)×10^{−8}		1×10^{−5}	
6	geocentric gravitational constant	GE	(3 986 005 ±3)×10^{+8}	m^{3}s^{−2}	8×10^{−7}	
7	constant of gravitation	G	(6 672 ±4.1)×10^{−14}	m^{3}kg^{−1}s^{−2}	6.1×10^{−4}	
8	Earth/Moon mass ratio	1/μ	81.300 7 ±0.000 3		4×10^{−6}	
	Moon/Earth mass ratio	μ	0.012 300 02		4×10^{−6}	
9	general precession in longitude	p	5 029.0966 ±0.15	" cy^{−1}	3×10^{−5}	
10	obliquity of the ecliptic	ε	23°26'21.448" ±0.10	"	1×10^{−6}	
11	constant of nutation at standard epoch J2000	N	9.2055	"	3×10^{−5}	
Derived Constants
12	unit distance (astronomical unit)	A = cτ_{A}	(149 597 870 ±2)×10^{+3}	m	1×10^{−8}	
13	solar parallax	π_{◌} = arcsin(a_{e}/A)	8.794 148 ±0.000 007	"	8×10^{−7}	
14	constant of aberration for standard epoch J2000	κ	20.495 52	"		
15	flattening factor for the Earth	f	0.003 352 81 ±0.000 000 02		6×10^{−6}	
	reciprocal flattening	1/f	(298 257 ± 1.5)×10^{−3}		5×10^{−6}	
16	heliocentric gravitational constant	GS = A^{3}k^{2}/D^{2}	(132 712 438 ±5)×10^{+12}	m^{3}s^{−2}	4×10^{−8}	
17	Sun/Earth mass ratio	S/E = GS/GE	332 946.0 ± 0.3		9×10^{−7}	
18	mass ratio Sun to Earth+Moon	(S/E)/(1+μ)	328 900.5 ±0.5		1.5×10^{−6}	
19	mass of the Sun	S = GS/G	(19 891 ±12)×10^{+26}	kg	6×10^{−4}	
20	ratios of mass of Sun to planets+satellites			1/S		
	Mercury		6 023 600			
	Venus		408 523.5			
	Earth+Moon		328 900.5			
	Mars		3 098 710			
	Jupiter		1 047.355			
	Saturn		3 498.5			
	Uranus		22 869			
	Neptune		19 314			
	Pluto		3 000 000			

=== Other quantities for use in the preparation of ephemerides ===
1.	Masses of minor planets	
Number	Name	Mass in solar mass
(1)	Ceres	(5.9 ±0.3)×10^{−10}
(2)	Pallas	(1.1 ±0.2)×10^{−10}
(4)	Vesta	(1.2 ±0.1)×10^{−10}

2.	Masses of satellites		
Planet	Number	Satellite	Satellite/Planet mass
Jupiter	I	Io	(4.70 ±0.06)×10^{−5}
	II	Europa	(2.56 ±0.06)×10^{−5}
	III	Ganymedes	(7.84 ±0.08)×10^{−5}
	IV	Callisto	(5.6 ±0.17)×10^{−5}
Saturnus	I	Titan	(2.41 ±0.018)×10^{−4}
Neptune	I	Triton	2×10^{−3}

3.	Equatorial radii
Object	Equatorial radius (km)
Mercury	2 439 ±1
Venus	6 052 ±6
Earth	6 378.140 ±0.005
Mars	3 397.2 ±1
Jupiter	71 398
Saturn	60 000
Uranus	25 400
Neptune	24 300
Pluto	2 500
Moon	1 738
Moon's disk, ratio to Earth's equatorial radius	k = 0.272 5076 a_{e}
Sun	696 000

4.	Gravity fields of the planets					
Planet	J_{2}	J_{3}	J_{4}	C_{22}	S_{22}	S_{31}
Earth	(+108 263 ±1)×10^{−8}	(−254 ±1)×10^{−8}	(−161 ±1)×10^{−8}			
Mars	(+1 964 ±6)×10^{−6}	(+36 ±20)×10^{−6}		(-55 ±1)×10^{−6}	(+31 ±2)×10^{−6}	(+26 ±5)×10^{−6}
Jupiter	+0.014 75		-0.000 58			
Saturn	+0.016 45		-0.0010			
Uranus	+0.012					
Neptune	+0.004					

5.	Gravity field of the Moon	
Quantity	Symbol	Value
average inclination of equator on ecliptic	I	5 552.7"
moment of inertia	C/MR^{2}	0.392
(C-A)/B	β	0.000 6313
(B-A)/C	γ	0.000 2278
	C_{20}	-0.000 2027
	C_{22}	+0.000 0223
	C_{30}	-0.000 006
	C_{31}	+0.000 029
	S_{31}	+0.000 004
	C_{32}	+0.000 0048
	S_{32}	+0.000 0017
	C_{33}	+0.000 0018
	S_{33}	-0.000 001
