= Planetary mass =

Measure of the mass of a planet-like astronomical body

In astronomy, planetary mass is a measure of the mass of a planet-like astronomical object. Within the Solar System, planets are usually measured in the astronomical system of units, where the unit of mass is the solar mass (M_{☉}), the mass of the Sun. In the study of extrasolar planets, the unit of measure is typically the mass of Jupiter (M_{J}) for large gas giant planets, and the mass of Earth (M_{🜨}) for smaller rocky terrestrial planets.

The mass of a planet within the Solar System is an adjusted parameter in the preparation of ephemerides. There are three variations of how planetary mass can be calculated:

- If the planet has natural satellites, its mass can be calculated using Newton's law of universal gravitation to derive a generalization of Kepler's third law that includes the mass of the planet and its moon. This permitted an early measurement of Jupiter's mass, as measured in units of the solar mass.
- The mass of a planet can be inferred from its effect on the orbits of other planets. In 1931-1948 flawed applications of this method led to incorrect calculations of the mass of Pluto.
- Data from influence collected from the orbits of space probes can be used. Examples include Voyager probes to the outer planets and the MESSENGER spacecraft to Mercury.
- Also, numerous other methods can give reasonable approximations. For instance, Varuna, a potential dwarf planet, rotates very quickly upon its axis, as does the dwarf planet Haumea. Haumea has to have a very high density in order not to be ripped apart by centrifugal forces. Through some calculations, one can place a limit on the object's density. Thus, if the object's size is known, a limit on the mass can be determined. See the links in the aforementioned articles for more details on this.

== Choice of units ==
The choice of solar mass, M_{☉}, as the basic unit for planetary mass comes directly from the calculations used to determine planetary mass. In the most precise case, that of the Earth itself, the mass is known in terms of solar masses to twelve significant figures: the same mass, in terms of kilograms or other Earth-based units, is only known to five significant figures, which is less than a millionth as precise.

The difference comes from the way in which planetary masses are calculated. It is impossible to "weigh" a planet, and much less the Sun, against the sort of mass standards which are used in the laboratory. On the other hand, the orbits of the planets give a great range of observational data as to the relative positions of each body, and these positions can be compared to their relative masses using Newton's law of universal gravitation (with small corrections for General Relativity where necessary). To convert these relative masses to Earth-based units such as the kilogram, it is necessary to know the value of the Newtonian constant of gravitation, G. This constant is remarkably difficult to measure in practice, and its value is known to a relative precision of only 2.2×10^{−5}.

The solar mass is quite a large unit on the scale of the Solar System: 1.9884(2)×10^{30} kg. The largest planet, Jupiter, is 0.09% the mass of the Sun, while the Earth is about three millionths (0.0003%) of the mass of the Sun.

When comparing the planets among themselves, it is often convenient to use the mass of the Earth (M_{🜨} or M_{🜨}) as a standard, particularly for the terrestrial planets. For the mass of gas giants, and also for most extrasolar planets and brown dwarfs, the mass of Jupiter (M_{J}) is a convenient comparison.

Planetary masses relative to the mass of Earth M_{🜨} and Jupiter M_{J}
Planet	Mercury	Venus	Earth	Mars	Jupiter	Saturn	Uranus	Neptune
Earth mass M_{🜨}	0.0553	0.815	1	0.1075	317.8	95.2	14.6	17.2
Jupiter mass M_{J}	0.000 17	0.002 56	0.003 15	0.000 34	1	0.299	0.046	0.054

== Planetary mass and planet formation ==
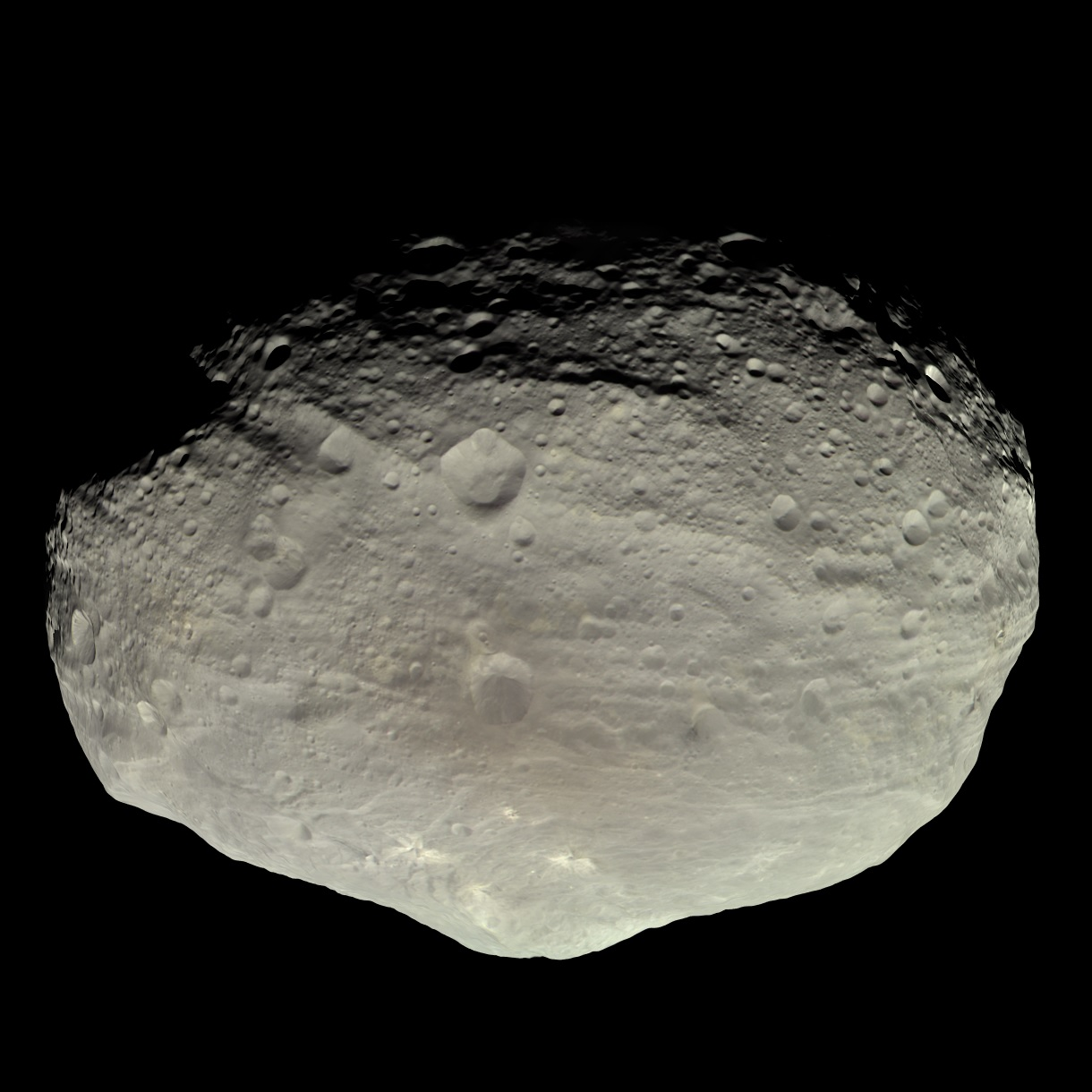
Vesta is the second largest body in the asteroid belt after Ceres. This image from the Dawn spacecraft shows that it is not perfectly spherical.

The mass of a planet has consequences for its structure by having a large mass, especially while it is in the hand of process of formation. A body with enough mass can overcome its compressive strength and achieve a rounded shape (roughly hydrostatic equilibrium). Since 2006, these objects have been classified as dwarf planet if it orbits around the Sun (that is, if it is not the satellite of another planet). The threshold depends on a number of factors, such as composition, temperature, and the presence of tidal heating. The smallest body that is known to be rounded is Saturn's moon Mimas, at about 1/160000 the mass of Earth; on the other hand, bodies as large as the Kuiper belt object Salacia, at about 1/13000 the mass of Earth, may not have overcome their compressive strengths. Smaller bodies like asteroids are classified as "small Solar System bodies".

A dwarf planet, by definition, is not massive enough to have gravitationally cleared its neighbouring region of planetesimals. The mass needed to do so depends on location: Mars clears its orbit in its current location, but would not do so if it orbited in the Oort cloud.

The smaller planets retain only silicates and metals, and are terrestrial planets like Earth or Mars. The interior structure of rocky planets is mass-dependent: for example, plate tectonics may require a minimum mass to generate sufficient temperatures and pressures for it to occur. Geophysical definitions would also include the dwarf planets and moons in the outer Solar System, which are like terrestrial planets except that they are composed of ice and rock rather than rock and metal: the largest such bodies are Ganymede, Titan, Callisto, Triton, and Pluto.

If the protoplanet grows by accretion to more than about twice the mass of Earth, its gravity becomes large enough to retain hydrogen in its atmosphere. In this case, it will grow into an ice giant or gas giant. As such, Earth and Venus are close to the maximum size a planet can usually grow to while still remaining rocky. If the planet then begins migration, it may move well within its system's frost line, and become a hot Jupiter orbiting very close to its star, then gradually losing small amounts of mass as the star's radiation strips its atmosphere.

The theoretical minimum mass a star can have, and still undergo hydrogen fusion at the core, is estimated to be about 75 M_{J}, though fusion of deuterium can occur at masses as low as 13 Jupiters.

== Values from the DE405 ephemeris ==
The DE405/LE405 ephemeris from the Jet Propulsion Laboratory is a widely used ephemeris dating from 1998 and covering the whole Solar System. As such, the planetary masses form a self-consistent set, which is not always the case for more recent data (see below).

Planets and natural satellites	Planetary mass (relative to the Sun × 10^{6} )	Satellite mass (relative to the parent planet)	Absolute mass	Mean density
Mercury	0.16601		3.301×10^{23} kg	5.43 g/cm^{3}
Venus	2.4478383		4.867×10^{24} kg	5.24 g/cm^{3}
Earth/Moon system	3.04043263333		6.046×10^{24} kg	4.4309 g/cm^{3}
Earth	3.00348959632		5.972×10^{24} kg	(Note: The separate densities given for the Earth and Moon were not determined from the DE405/LE405 data, but are listed in the table for comparison to other planets and satellites.) 5.514 g/cm^{3}
Moon		1.23000383×10^{−2}	7.348×10^{22} kg	3.344 g/cm^{3}
Mars	0.3227151		6.417×10^{23} kg	3.91 g/cm^{3}
Jupiter	954.79194		1.899×10^{27} kg	1.24 g/cm^{3}
Io		4.70×10^{−5}	8.93×10^{22} kg	
Europa		2.53×10^{−5}	4.80×10^{22} kg	
Ganymede		7.80×10^{−5}	1.48×10^{23} kg	
Callisto		5.67×10^{−5}	1.08×10^{23} kg	
Saturn	285.8860		5.685×10^{26} kg	0.62 g/cm^{3}
Titan		2.37×10^{−4}	1.35×10^{23} kg	
Uranus	43.66244		8.682×10^{25} kg	1.24 g/cm^{3}
Titania		4.06×10^{−5}	3.52×10^{21} kg	
Oberon		3.47×10^{−5}	3.01×10^{21} kg	
Neptune	51.51389		1.024×10^{26} kg	1.61 g/cm^{3}
Triton		2.09×10^{−4}	2.14×10^{22} kg	
Dwarf planets and asteroids
Pluto/Charon system	0.007396		1.471×10^{22} kg	2.06 g/cm^{3}
Ceres	0.00047		9.3×10^{20} kg	
Vesta	0.00013		2.6×10^{20} kg	
Pallas	0.00010		2.0×10^{20} kg	

=== Earth mass and lunar mass ===
Where a planet has natural satellites, its mass is usually quoted for the whole system (planet + satellites), as it is the mass of the whole system which acts as a perturbation on the orbits of other planets. The distinction is very slight, as natural satellites are much smaller than their parent planets (as can be seen in the table above, where only the largest satellites are even listed).

The Earth and the Moon form a case in point, partly because the Moon is unusually large (just over 1% of the mass of the Earth) in relation to its parent planet compared with other natural satellites. There are also very precise data available for the Earth–Moon system, particularly from the Lunar Laser Ranging experiment (LLR).

The geocentric gravitational constant – the product of the mass of the Earth times the Newtonian constant of gravitation – can be measured to high precision from the orbits of the Moon and of artificial satellites. The ratio of the two masses can be determined from the slight wobble in the Earth's orbit caused by the gravitational attraction of the Moon.

== More recent values ==
The construction of a full, high-precision Solar System ephemeris is an onerous task. It is possible (and somewhat simpler) to construct partial ephemerides which only concern the planets (or dwarf planets, satellites, asteroids) of interest by "fixing" the motion of the other planets in the model. The two methods are not strictly equivalent, especially when it comes to assigning uncertainties to the results: however, the "best" estimates – at least in terms of quoted uncertainties in the result – for the masses of minor planets and asteroids usually come from partial ephemerides.

Nevertheless, new complete ephemerides continue to be prepared, most notably the EPM2004 ephemeris from the Institute of Applied Astronomy of the Russian Academy of Sciences. EPM2004 is based on 317014 separate observations between 1913 and 2003, more than seven times as many as DE405, and gave more precise masses for Ceres and five asteroids.

Planetary mass (relative to the Sun × 10^{6})
	EPM2004	Vitagliano & Stoss (2006)	Brown & Schaller (2007)	Tholen et al. (2008)	Pitjeva & Standish (2009)	Ragozzine & Brown (2009)
136199 Eris			84.0(1.0)×10^{−4}			
134340 Pluto				73.224(15)×10^{−4} (Note: For ease of comparison with other values, the mass given in the table is for the entire Pluto system: this is also the value which appears in the IAU "current best estimates". Tholen et al. also give estimates for the masses of the four bodies which comprise the Pluto system: Pluto 6.558(28)×10^{−9} M_{☉}, 1.304(5)×10^{22} kg; Charon 7.64(21)×10^{−10} M_{☉}, 1.52(4)×10^{21} kg; Nix 2.9×10^{−13} M_{☉}, 5.8×10^{17} kg; Hydra 1.6×10^{−13} M_{☉}, 3.2×10^{17} kg.)		
136108 Haumea						20.1(2)×10^{−4}
1 Ceres	4.753(7)×10^{−4}				4.72(3)×10^{−4}	
4 Vesta	1.344(1)×10^{−4}				1.35(3)×10^{−4}	
2 Pallas	1.027(3)×10^{−4}				1.03(3)×10^{−4}	
15 Eunomia		0.164(6)×10^{−4}				
3 Juno	0.151(3)×10^{−4}					
7 Iris	0.063(1)×10^{−4}					
324 Bamberga	0.055(1)×10^{−4}					

== IAU best estimates (2009) ==
A new set of "current best estimates" for various astronomical constants was approved the 27th General Assembly of the International Astronomical Union (IAU) in August 2009.

Planet	Ratio of the solar mass to the planetary mass (including satellites)	Planetary mass (relative to the Sun × 10^{6})	Mass (kg)	Ref
Mercury	6023.6(3)×10^{3}	0.166014(8)	3.3010(3)×10^{23}	
Venus	408.523719(8)×10^{3}	2.08106272(3)	4.86731×10^{24}	
Mars	3098.70359(2)×10^{3}	0.3232371722(21)	6.4273(6)×10^{23}	
Jupiter (Note: The value quoted by the IAU Working Group on Numerical Standards for Fundamental Astronomy (1.047348644×10^{3}) is inconsistent with the quoted uncertainty (1.7×10^{−3}): the value has been rounded here.)	1.0473486(17)×10^{3}	954.7919(15)	1.89852(19)×10^{27}	
Saturn	3.4979018(1)×10^{3}	285.885670(8)	5.6846(6)×10^{26}	
Uranus	22.90298(3)×10^{3}	43.66244(6)	8.6819(9)×10^{25}	
Neptune	19.41226(3)×10^{3}	51.51384(8)	1.02431(10)×10^{26}	

== IAU current best estimates (2012) ==
The 2009 set of "current best estimates" was updated in 2012 by resolution B2 of the IAU XXVIII General Assembly. Improved values were given for Mercury and Uranus (and also for the Pluto system and Vesta).

Planet	Ratio of the solar mass to the planetary mass (including satellites)
Mercury	6023.657 33 (24)×10^{3}
Uranus	22.902951(17)×10^{3}

== See also ==
- Astronomical system of units
- Standard gravitational parameter
- Planetary-mass object
