= Astronomical system of units =

System of measurement developed for use in astronomy

The astronomical system of units, formerly called the IAU (1976) System of Astronomical Constants, is a system of measurement developed for use in astronomy. It was adopted by the International Astronomical Union (IAU) in 1976 via Resolution No. 1, and has been significantly updated in 1994 and 2009 (see Astronomical constant).

The system was developed because of the difficulties in measuring and expressing astronomical data in International System of Units (SI units). In particular, there is a huge quantity of very precise data relating to the positions of objects within the Solar System that cannot conveniently be expressed or processed in SI units. Through a number of modifications, the astronomical system of units now explicitly recognizes the consequences of general relativity, which is a necessary addition to the International System of Units in order to accurately treat astronomical data.

The astronomical system of units is a tridimensional system, in that it defines units of length, mass and time. The associated astronomical constants also fix the different frames of reference that are needed to report observations. (See Barycentric and geocentric celestial reference systems.) It is a conventional system, in that neither the unit of length nor the unit of mass are true physical constants, and there are at least three different measures of time.

== Astronomical unit of time ==
The astronomical unit of time is the day, defined as 86400 seconds. 365.25 days make up one Julian year. The symbol D is used in astronomy to refer to this unit.

== Astronomical unit of mass ==
The astronomical unit of mass is the solar mass. The symbol M_{☉} is often used to refer to this unit. The solar mass (M_{☉}), 1.98892×10^{30} kg, is a standard way to express mass in astronomy, used to describe the masses of other stars and galaxies. It is approximately equal to the mass of the Sun, about 333000 times the mass of the Earth or 1 048 times the mass of Jupiter.

In practice, the masses of celestial bodies appear in the dynamics of the Solar System only through the products GM, where G is the gravitational constant. In the past, GM of the Sun could be determined experimentally with only limited accuracy. Its present best known value is GM_{☉} = 1.32712442099(10)×10^{20} m^{3}⋅s^{−2}.

The nominal value of the solar GM recommended for use in astrophysics as an exactly defined unit by the IAU is 1 (𝒢ℳ)^{N}_{☉} = 1.3271244×10^{20} m^{3}⋅s^{−2}.

=== Jupiter mass ===
Jupiter mass (M_{J} or M_{Jup}), is the unit of mass approximately equal to the total mass of the planet Jupiter, 1.898×10^{27} kg. Jupiter mass is used to describe masses of the gas giants, such as the outer planets and extrasolar planets. It is also used in describing brown dwarfs and Neptune-mass planets. The nominal value recommended by the IAU for the GM of Jupiter is 1 (𝒢ℳ)^{N}_{J} = 1.2668653×10^{17} m^{3}⋅s^{−2}.

=== Earth mass ===
Earth mass (M_{🜨}) is the unit of mass approximately equal to that of the Earth, 5.9742×10^{24} kg. Earth mass is often used to describe masses of rocky terrestrial planets and up to approximately Neptune-mass planets. The nominal value recommended by the IAU for the GM of Earth is 1 (𝒢ℳ)^{N}_{E} = 3.986004×10^{14} m^{3}⋅s^{−2}.

Equivalent planetary masses
	Solar mass	Jupiter mass	Earth mass
Solar masses	1	9.545942×10^{−4}	3.003489×10^{−6}
Jupiter masses	1047.566	1	3.146352×10^{−3}
Earth masses	332946.1	317.8284	1

== Astronomical unit of length ==
The astronomical unit of length is now defined as exactly 149 597 870 700 meters. It is approximately equal to the mean Earth–Sun distance. It was formerly defined as that length for which the Gaussian gravitational constant (k) takes the value 0.01720209895 when the units of measurement are the astronomical units of length, mass and time. The dimensions of k^{2} are those of the constant of gravitation (G), i.e., L^{3}M^{−1}T^{−2}. The term "unit distance" is also used for the length A while, in general usage, it is usually referred to simply as the "astronomical unit", symbol au.

An equivalent formulation of the old definition of the astronomical unit is the radius of an unperturbed circular Newtonian orbit about the Sun of a particle having infinitesimal mass, moving with a mean motion of 0.01720209895 radians per day. The speed of light in IAU is the defined value c_{0} = 299792458 m/s of the SI units. In terms of this speed, the old definition of the astronomical unit of length had the accepted value: 1 au = c_{0}τ_{A} = (149597870700±3) m, where τ_{A} is the transit time of light across the astronomical unit. The astronomical unit of length was determined by the condition that the measured data in the ephemeris match observations, and that in turn decides the transit time τ_{A}.

=== Other units for astronomical distances ===
Astronomical range	Typical units
Distances to satellites	kilometres
Distances to near-Earth objects	lunar distance
Planetary distances	astronomical units
Distances to nearby stars	parsecs, light-years
Distances at the galactic scale	kiloparsecs
Distances to nearby galaxies	megaparsecs

The distances to distant galaxies are typically not quoted in distance units at all, but rather in terms of redshift. The reasons for this are that converting redshift to distance requires knowledge of the Hubble constant, which was not accurately measured until the early 21st century, and that at cosmological distances, the curvature of spacetime allows one to come up with multiple definitions for distance. For example, the distance as defined by the amount of time it takes for a light beam to travel to an observer is different from the distance as defined by the apparent size of an object.

== See also ==
- Astronomical constant
- Standard gravitational parameter
- Planetary mass
- Natural units
