= Light-second =

Unit of length

- The distance between the Earth and the Moon is approximately 1.3 light-seconds

General information
- Unit of: length

Conversions
1 light-second in ...	... is equal to ...
- SI units: 299792458 m
- astronomical units: 0.0020040 AU; 3.1688×10^{−8} ly 9.7156×10^{−9} pc
- imperial/US units: 186282 mi

The light-second is a unit of length useful in astronomy, telecommunications and relativistic physics. It is defined as the distance that light travels in free space in one second, and is equal to exactly 299792458 m (approximately 983571055 ft or 186282 miles).

Just as the second forms the basis for other units of time, the light-second can form the basis for other units of length, ranging from the light-nanosecond (299.8 mm or just under one international foot) to the light-minute, light-hour and light-day, which are sometimes used in popular science publications. The more commonly used light-year is also currently defined to be equal to precisely 31557600 light-seconds, since the definition of a year is based on a Julian year (not the Gregorian year) of exactly 365.25 d, each of exactly 86400 SI seconds.

== Use in telecommunications ==
Communications signals on Earth travel at precisely the speed of light in free space. Distances in fractions of a light-second are useful for planning telecommunications networks.

- One light-nanosecond is almost 300 millimetres (299.8 mm, 5 mm less than one foot), which limits the speed of data transfer between different parts of a computer.
- One light-microsecond is about 300 metres.
- The mean distance, over land, between opposite sides of the Earth is 66.8 light-milliseconds.
- Geostationary communications satellites are typically 119.4 light-milliseconds from the surface of the Earth. Hence there will always be a delay of at least a quarter of a second in a communication via geostationary satellite (119.4 ms × 2); this delay is just perceptible in a transoceanic telephone conversation routed by satellite and during interviews or discussions on TV when sent over satellite.
- Low Earth orbit satellites are much closer at around 1.33 light-milliseconds (400 km).

== Use in astronomy ==
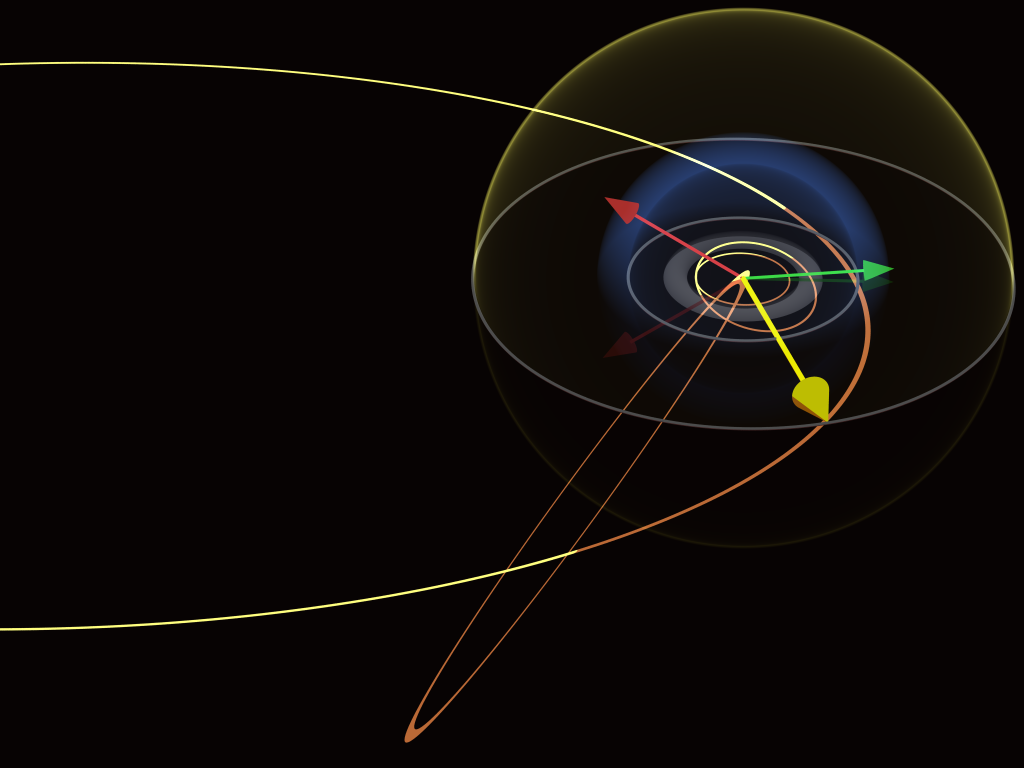
The yellow shell indicating one light-day distance from the Sun compares in size with the positions of Voyager 1 and Pioneer 10 as of 2008 (red and green arrows respectively). It is larger than the heliosphere's termination shock (blue shell) but smaller than Comet Hale-Bopp's orbit (faint orange ellipse below). Click on the image for a larger view and links to other scales.

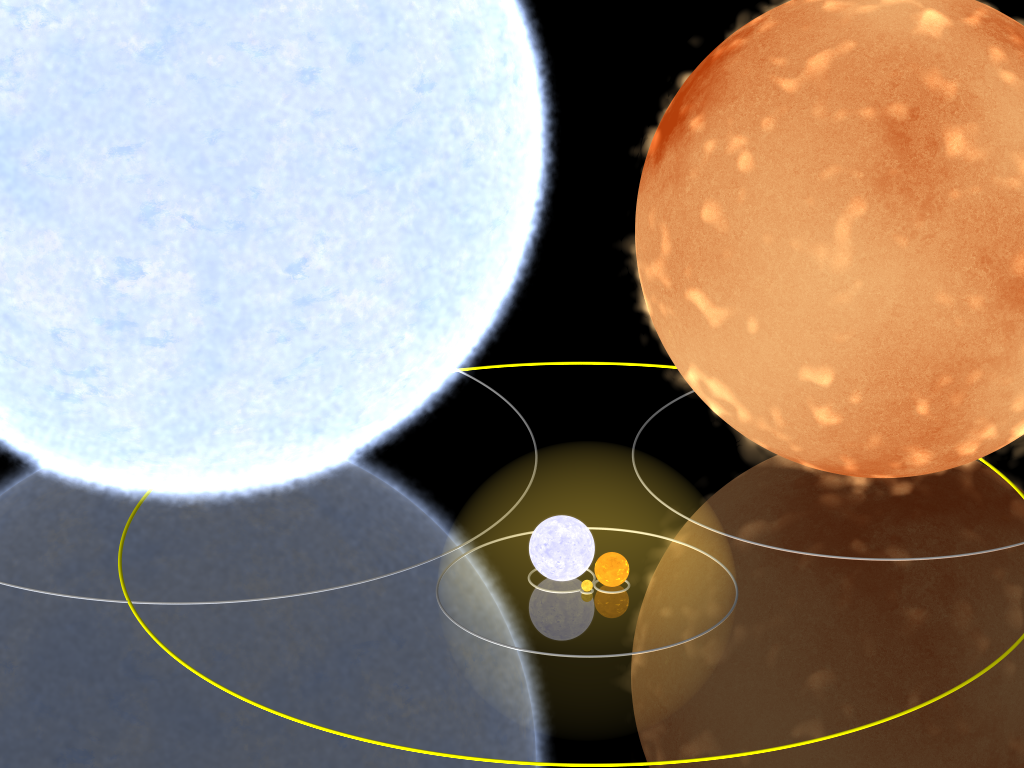
The faint yellow sphere centred on the Sun has a radius of one light-minute. For comparison, sizes of Rigel (the blue star in the top left) and Aldebaran (the red star in the top right) are shown to scale. The large yellow ellipse represents Mercury's orbit.

The light-second is a convenient unit for measuring distances in the inner Solar System, since it corresponds very closely to the radiometric data used to determine them. (The match is not exact for an Earth-based observer because of a very small correction for the effects of relativity.) The value of the astronomical unit (roughly the distance between Earth and the Sun) in light-seconds is a fundamental measurement for the calculation of modern ephemerides (tables of planetary positions). It is usually quoted as "light-time for unit distance" in tables of astronomical constants, and its currently accepted value is 499.004786385(20) s.

- The mean diameter of Earth is about 0.0425 light-seconds.
- The average distance between Earth and the Moon (the lunar distance) is about 1.282 light-seconds.
- The diameter of the Sun is about 4.643 light-seconds.
- The average distance between Earth and the Sun (the astronomical unit) is 499.0 light-seconds.

Multiples of the light-second can be defined, although apart from the light-year, they are more used in popular science publications than in research works. For example:

- A light-minute is 60 light-seconds, and so the average distance between Earth and the Sun is 8.317 light-minutes.
- The average distance between Pluto and the Sun (34.72 AU) is 4.81 light-hours.
- Humanity's most distant artificial object, Voyager 1, has an interstellar velocity of 3.57 AU per year, or 29.7 light-minutes per year. As of 2026, the probe, launched in 1977, is 1 light-day from Earth, reaching the milestone on November 18th, 2026.

Unit	Definition	Equivalent distance in			Example
Unit	Definition	Meters	Kilometers	Miles	Example
light-second	1 light-second	299792458 m	2.998×10^{5} km	1.863×10^{5} miles	Average distance from the Earth to the Moon is about 1.282 light-seconds
light-minute	60 light-seconds = 1 light-minute	17987547480 m	1.799×10^{7} km	1.118×10^{7} miles	Average distance from the Earth to the Sun is 8.317 light-minutes
light-hour	60 light-minutes = 3600 light-seconds	1079252848800 m	1.079×10^{9} km	6.706×10^{8} miles	The perihelion of Saturn's orbit is about 1.25 light-hours
light-day	24 light-hours = 86400 light-seconds	25902068371200 m	2.590×10^{10} km	1.609×10^{10} miles	Voyager 1 is about 1 light-day from the Sun (as of November 2026)
light-week	7 light-days = 604800 light-seconds	181314478598400 m	1.813×10^{11} km	1.127×10^{11} miles	The aphelion of Sedna's orbit is thought to extend 0.77 light-weeks out from the Sun
light-month	30 light-days =2592000 light-seconds	777062051136000 m	7.770×10^{11} km	4.828×10^{11} miles	The Oort cloud is thought to extend between 9.5 and 19.1 light-months out from the Sun
light-year	365.25 light-days = 31557600 light-seconds	9460730472580800 m	9.461×10^{12} km	5.879×10^{12} miles	Proxima Centauri is the nearest star to the Sun, about 4.24 light years away

== See also ==
- 100 megametres
- Geometrized unit system
- Light-year
