= Mean motion =

Angular speed required for a body to complete one orbit

In orbital mechanics, mean motion (represented by n) is the angular speed required for a body to complete one orbit, assuming constant speed in a circular orbit which completes in the same time as the variable speed, elliptical orbit of the actual body. The concept applies equally well to a small body revolving about a large, massive primary body or to two relatively same-sized bodies revolving about a common center of mass. While nominally a mean, and theoretically so in the case of two-body motion, in practice the mean motion is not typically an average over time for the orbits of real bodies, which only approximate the two-body assumption. It is rather the instantaneous value which satisfies the above conditions as calculated from the current gravitational and geometric circumstances of the body's constantly-changing, perturbed orbit.

Mean motion is used as an approximation of the actual orbital speed in making an initial calculation of the body's position in its orbit, for instance, from a set of orbital elements. This mean position is refined by Kepler's equation to produce the true position.

== Definition ==
Define the orbital period (the time period for the body to complete one orbit) as P, with dimension of time. The mean motion is simply one revolution divided by this time:

$$n = \frac{2\pi \, \text{radians}}{P} = \frac{360^\circ}{P} = \frac{1 \, \text{revolution}}{P}$$

The value of mean motion depends on the circumstances of the particular gravitating system. In systems with more mass, bodies will orbit faster, in accordance with Newton's law of universal gravitation. Likewise, bodies closer together will also orbit faster.

=== Mean motion and Kepler's laws ===
Kepler's 3rd law of planetary motion states, the square of the periodic time is proportional to the cube of the mean distance, or

$${a^3} \propto {P^2},$$

where a is the semi-major axis or mean distance, and P is the orbital period as above. The constant of proportionality is given by

$$\frac{a^3}{P^2} = \frac {\mu}{4\pi^2},$$

where μ is the standard gravitational parameter, a constant for any particular gravitational system.

If the mean motion is given in units of radians per unit of time, we can combine it into the above definition of the Kepler's 3rd law,

$$\frac {\mu}{4\pi^2} = \frac{a^3}{\left(\frac{2\pi}{n}\right)^2},$$

and reducing,

$$\mu = a^3n^2,$$

which is another definition of Kepler's 3rd law. μ, the constant of proportionality, (Note: Do not confuse μ, the gravitational parameter with μ, the reduced mass.) is a gravitational parameter defined by the masses of the bodies in question and by the Newtonian constant of gravitation, G (see below). Therefore, n is also defined as

$$n^2 = \frac{\mu}{a^3}, \quad \text{or} \quad n = \sqrt{\frac{\mu}{a^3}}.$$

Expanding mean motion by expanding μ,

$$n = \sqrt{\frac{ G( M  + m ) }{a^3}},$$

where M is typically the mass of the primary body of the system and m is the mass of a smaller body.

This is the complete gravitational definition of mean motion in a two-body system. Often in celestial mechanics, the primary body is much larger than any of the secondary bodies of the system, that is, $M \gg m$. It is under these circumstances that m becomes unimportant and Kepler's 3rd law is approximately constant for all of the smaller bodies.

Kepler's 2nd law of planetary motion states, a line joining a planet and the Sun sweeps out equal areas in equal times, or alternatively, using Leibniz's notation,

$$\frac{\mathrm{d}A}{\mathrm{d}t} = \text{constant}$$

for a two-body orbit, where $\frac{\mathrm{d}A}{\mathrm{d}t}$ is the time-based rate of change of the area swept.

Letting $t = P$, the orbital period, the area swept is the entire area of the ellipse, $\mathrm{d}A = \pi ab$, where a is the semi-major axis and b is the semi-minor axis of the ellipse. Hence,

$$\frac{\mathrm{d}A}{\mathrm{d}t} = \frac{\pi ab}{P}.$$

Multiplying this equation by 2,

$$2 \left( \frac{\mathrm{d}A}{\mathrm{d}t} \right) = 2 \left( \frac{\pi ab}{P} \right).$$

From the above definition, mean motion $n = \frac{2 \pi}{P}$. Substituting,

$$2\frac{\mathrm{d}A}{\mathrm{d}t} = nab,$$

and mean motion is also

$$n = \frac{2}{ab}\frac{\mathrm{d}A}{\mathrm{d}t},$$

which is itself constant as a, b, and $\frac{\mathrm{d}A}{\mathrm{d}t}$ are all constant in two-body motion.

=== Mean motion and the constants of the motion ===
Because of the nature of two-body motion in a conservative gravitational field, two aspects of the motion do not change: the angular momentum and the mechanical energy.

The first constant, called specific angular momentum, can be defined as

$$h = 2\frac{\mathrm{d}A}{\mathrm{d}t},$$

and substituting in the above equation, mean motion is also

$$n = \frac{h}{ab}.$$

The second constant, called specific mechanical energy, can be defined,

$$\xi = -\frac{\mu}{2a}.$$

Rearranging and dividing by $a^2$,

$$\frac{-2\xi}{a^2} = \frac{\mu}{a^3}.$$

From above, the square of mean motion $n^2 = \frac{\mu}{a^3}$. Substituting and rearranging, mean motion can also be expressed,

$$n = \frac{1}{a}\sqrt{-2\xi},$$

where the −2 shows that ξ must be defined as a negative number, as is customary for elliptic orbits in celestial mechanics and astrodynamics.

=== Mean motion and the gravitational constants ===
Two gravitational constants are commonly used in Solar System celestial mechanics: G, the Newtonian constant of gravitation and k, the Gaussian gravitational constant. From the above definitions, mean motion is

$$n = \sqrt{\frac{ G( M  + m ) }{a^3}}\,\!.$$

By normalizing parts of this equation and making some assumptions, it can be simplified, revealing the relation between the mean motion and the constants.

For example, setting the mass of the Sun to unity (M = 1), the masses of the planets are all much smaller ($m \ll M$). Therefore, for any particular planet,

$$n \approx \sqrt{\frac{G}{a^3}},$$

and also taking the semi-major axis as one astronomical unit,

$$n_{1\;\text{AU}} \approx \sqrt{G}.$$

The Gaussian gravitational constant $k = \sqrt G$, (Note: The Gaussian gravitational constant, k, usually has units of radians per day and the Newtonian constant of gravitation, G, is usually given in SI units. Be careful when converting.) therefore, under the same conditions as above, for any particular planet,

$$n \approx \frac{k}{\sqrt{a^3}},$$

and again taking the semi-major axis as one astronomical unit,

$$n_{1\text{ AU}} \approx k.$$

=== Mean motion and mean anomaly ===
Mean motion also represents the rate of change of mean anomaly, and hence can also be calculated,

$$\begin{align}
n &= \frac{M_1 - M_0}{t_1 - t_0} = \frac{M_1 - M_0}{\Delta t}, \\
M_1 &= M_0 + n \times (t_1 - t_0) = M_0 + n \times \Delta t
\end{align}$$

where $M_1$ and $M_0$ are the mean anomalies at particular points in time, and $\Delta t (\equiv t_1 - t_0)$ is the time elapsed between the two. $M_0$ is referred to as the mean anomaly at epoch $t_0$, and $\Delta t$ is the time since epoch.

== Formulae ==
For Earth satellite orbital parameters, the mean motion is typically measured in revolutions per day. In that case,

$$n = \frac{d}{2\pi}\sqrt{\frac{ G( M  + m ) }{a^3}} = d\sqrt{\frac{ G( M  + m ) }{4\pi^2 a^3}}\,\!$$

where

- d is the quantity of time in a day,
- G is the gravitational constant,
- M and m are the masses of the orbiting bodies, and
- a is the length of the semi-major axis.

To convert from radians per unit time to revolutions per day, consider the following:

$${\rm \frac{radians}{time\ unit}\times\frac{1\ revolution}{2\pi\ radians}\times}\frac{d\ {\rm time\ units}}{1{\rm \ day}} = \frac{d}{2\pi} {\rm\ revolutions\ per\ day}$$

From above, mean motion in radians per unit time is:

$$n = \frac{2\pi}{P},$$

therefore the mean motion in revolutions per day is

$$n = \frac{d}{2\pi} \frac{2\pi}{P} = \frac{d}{P},$$

where P is the orbital period, as above.

== See also ==
- Gaussian gravitational constant
- Kepler orbit
- Mean anomaly
- Mean longitude
- Mean motion resonance
- Orbital elements
