= Light-year =

Distance that light travels in one year

light-year
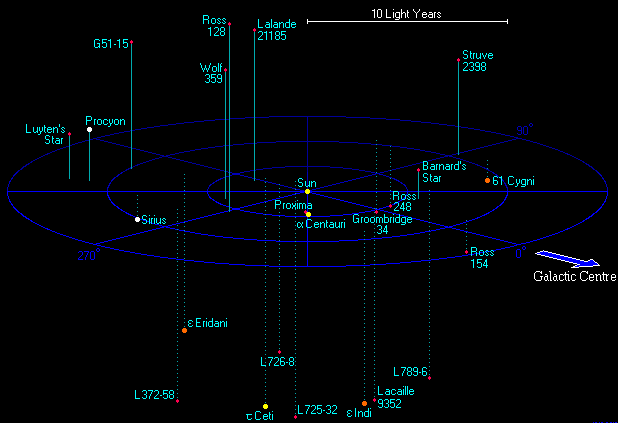
- Map showing stars and star systems lying within 12.5 light-years of the Sun

General information
- Unit system: astronomy units
- Unit of: length
- Symbol: ly

Conversions
1 ly in ...	... is equal to ...
- metric (SI) units: 9.4607×10^{15} m; 9.46073 Pm
- imperial and US units: 5.8786×10^{12} mi
- astronomical units: 63241 au; 0.3066 pc

A light-year, alternatively spelled light year (ly or lyr), is a unit of length used to express astronomical distances and is equal to exactly 9460730472580.8 km, which is approximately 9.46 trillion kilometres or 5.88 trillion miles. As defined by the International Astronomical Union (IAU), a light-year is the distance that light travels in vacuum in one Julian year (365.25 days). Despite its inclusion of the word "year", the term is a unit of distance, not a unit of time.

The light-year is most often used when expressing distances to stars and other distances on a galactic scale, especially in non-specialist contexts and popular science publications. The unit most commonly used in professional astronomy is the parsec (pc), approximately 3.26 light-years.

== Definitions ==
As defined by the International Astronomical Union (IAU), the light-year is the product of the Julian year (Note: One Julian year is exactly 365.25 days (or 31557600 s based on a day of exactly 86400 SI seconds)) (365.25 days, as opposed to the 365.2425-day Gregorian year or the 365.24219-day Tropical year that both approximate) and the speed of light (299792458 m/s). (Note: The speed of light is precisely 299792458 m/s by definition of the metre.) Both of these values are included in the IAU (1976) System of Astronomical Constants, used since 1984. From this, the following conversions can be derived:

1 light-year	= 9460730472580800 metres (exactly)
1 light-year	c. 9.461 petametres
1 light-year	c. 9.461 trillion (short scale) kilometres (5.879 trillion miles)
1 light-year	c. 63241.077 astronomical units
1 light-year	c. 0.306601 parsec

The abbreviation used by the IAU for light-year is "ly", International standards like ISO 80000:2006 (now superseded) have used "l.y." and localized abbreviations are frequent, such as "al" in French, Spanish, and Italian (from année-lumière, año luz and anno luce, respectively), "Lj" in German (from Lichtjahr), etc.

Before 1984, the tropical year (not the Julian year) and a measured (not defined) speed of light were included in the IAU (1964) System of Astronomical Constants, used from 1968 to 1983. The product of Simon Newcomb's J1900.0 mean tropical year of 31556925.9747 ephemeris seconds and a speed of light of 299792.5 km/s produced a light-year of 9.460530×10^{15} m (rounded to the seven significant digits in the speed of light) found in several modern sources was probably derived from an old source such as C. W. Allen's 1973 Astrophysical Quantities reference work, which was updated in 2000, including the IAU (1976) value cited above (truncated to 10 significant digits).

Other high-precision values are not derived from a coherent IAU system. A value of 9.460536207×10^{15} m found in some modern sources is the product of a mean Gregorian year (365.2425 days or 31556952 s) and the defined speed of light (299792458 m/s). Another value, 9.460528405×10^{15} m, is the product of the J1900.0 mean tropical year and the defined speed of light.

Abbreviations used for light-years and multiples of light-years are:

- "ly" for one light-year
- "kly" or "klyr" for a kilolight-year (1000 light-years)
- "Mly" for a megalight-year (1000000 light-years)
- "Gly" or "Glyr" for a gigalight-year (1000000000 light-years)

== History ==
The light-year unit appeared a few years after the first successful measurement of the distance to a star other than the Sun, by Friedrich Bessel in 1838. The star was 61 Cygni, and he used a 160-millimetre (6.2 in) heliometre designed by Joseph von Fraunhofer. The largest unit for expressing distances across space at that time was the astronomical unit, equal to the radius of the Earth's orbit at 150 million kilometres (93 million miles). In those terms, trigonometric calculations based on 61 Cygni's parallax of 0.314 arcseconds, showed the distance to the star to be 660000 astronomical units (9.9×10^{13} km; 6.1×10^{13} mi). Bessel added that light takes 10.3 years to traverse this distance. He recognized that his readers would enjoy the mental picture of the approximate transit time for light, but he refrained from using the light-year as a unit. He may have resisted expressing distances in light-years because it would reduce the accuracy of his parallax data due to multiplying with the uncertain parameter of the speed of light.

The speed of light was not yet precisely known in 1838; the estimate of its value changed in 1849 (Fizeau) and 1862 (Foucault). It was not yet considered to be a fundamental constant of nature, and the propagation of light through the aether or space was still enigmatic.

The light-year unit appeared in 1851 in a German popular astronomical article by Otto Ule. Ule explained the oddity of a distance unit name ending in "year" by comparing it to a walking hour (Wegstunde).

A contemporary German popular astronomical book also noticed that light-year is an odd name. In 1868 an English journal labelled the light-year as a unit used by the Germans. Eddington called the light-year an inconvenient and irrelevant unit, which had sometimes crept from popular use into technical investigations.

Although modern astronomers often prefer to use the parsec, light-years are also popularly used to gauge the expanses of interstellar and intergalactic space.

== Usage of term ==
Distances expressed in light-years include those between stars in the same general area, such as those belonging to the same spiral arm or globular cluster. Galaxies themselves span from a few thousand to a few hundred thousand light-years in diameter, and are separated from neighbouring galaxies and galaxy clusters by millions of light-years. Distances to objects such as quasars and the Sloan Great Wall run into the billions of light-years.

List of orders of magnitude for length
Scale (ly)	Value	Item
10^{−9}	4.04×10^{−8} ly	Reflected sunlight from the Moon's surface takes 1.2–1.3 seconds to travel the distance to the Earth's surface (travelling roughly 350000 to 400000 kilometres).
10^{−6}	1.58×10^{−5} ly	One astronomical unit (the distance from the Sun to the Earth). It takes approximately 499 seconds (8.32 minutes) for light to travel this distance.
10^{−6}	1.27×10^{−4} ly	The Huygens probe lands on Titan off Saturn and transmits images from its surface, 1.2 billion kilometres from Earth.
10^{−6}	5.04×10^{−4} ly	New Horizons encounters Pluto at a distance of 4.7 billion kilometres, and the communication takes 4 hours 25 minutes to reach Earth.
10^{−3}	2.04×10^{−3} ly	The most distant space probe, Voyager 1, was about 18 light-hours (130 au,19.4 billion km, 12.1 billion mi) away from the Earth as of October 2014. It will take about 17500 years to reach one light-year at its current speed of about 17 km/s (38000 mph, 61 200 km/h) relative to the Sun. On 12 September 2013, NASA scientists announced that Voyager 1 had entered the interstellar medium of space on 25 August 2012, becoming the first manmade object to leave the Solar System.
10^{−3}	2.74×10^{−3} ly	Voyager 1 as of November 2026, about 1 light-day (~173 au, ~25.9 billion km, ~16.1 billion mi) from the Earth.
10^{0}	1.6×10^{0} ly	The Oort cloud is approximately two light-years in diameter. Its inner boundary is speculated to be at 50000 au ≈ 0.8 ly, with its outer edge at 100000 au ≈ 1.6 ly.
10^{0}	2.0×10^{0} ly	Approximate maximum distance at which an object can orbit the Sun (Hill sphere/Roche sphere, 125000 au). Beyond this is the deep ex-solar gravitational interstellar medium.
10^{0}	4.24×10^{0} ly	The nearest known star (other than the Sun), Proxima Centauri, is about 4.24 light-years away.
10^{0}	8.6×10^{0} ly	Sirius, the brightest star of the night sky. Twice as massive and 25 times more luminous than the Sun, it outshines more luminous stars due to its relative proximity.
10^{0}	1.19×10^{1} ly	Tau Ceti e, an extrasolar candidate for a habitable planet. 6.6 times as massive as the earth, it is in the middle of the habitable zone of star Tau Ceti.
10^{0}	2.05×10^{1} ly	Gliese 581, a red-dwarf star with several detectable exoplanets.
10^{0}	3.1×10^{2} ly	Canopus, second in brightness in the terrestrial sky only to Sirius, a type A9 bright giant 10700 times more luminous than the Sun.
10^{3}	1.56×10^{3} ly	Gaia BH1, the nearest known black hole, is about 1560 light-years away.
10^{3}	3.3×10^{3} ly	A0620-00, the fifth-nearest known black hole, is about 3300 light-years away.
10^{3}	2.6×10^{4} ly	The centre of the Milky Way is about 26000 light-years away.
10^{3}	1×10^{5} ly	The Milky Way is about 100000 light-years across.
10^{3}	1.65×10^{5} ly	R136a1, in the Large Magellanic Cloud, the most luminous star known at 8.7 million times the luminosity of the Sun, has an apparent magnitude 12.77, just brighter than 3C 273.
10^{6}	2.5×10^{6} ly	The Andromeda Galaxy is approximately 2.5 million light-years away.
10^{6}	3×10^{6} ly	The Triangulum Galaxy (M33), at about 3 million light-years away, is the most distant object visible to the naked eye.
10^{6}	5.9×10^{7} ly	The nearest large galaxy cluster, the Virgo Cluster, is about 59 million light-years away.
10^{6}	1.5×10^{8} – 2.5×10^{8} ly	The Great Attractor lies at a distance of somewhere between 150 and 250 million light-years (the latter being the most recent estimate).
10^{9}	1.2×10^{9} ly	The Sloan Great Wall (not to be confused with Great Wall and Her–CrB GW) has been measured to be approximately one billion light-years distant.
10^{9}	2.4×10^{9} ly	3C 273, optically the brightest quasar, of apparent magnitude 12.9, just dimmer than R136a1. 3C 273 is about 2.4 billion light-years away.
10^{9}	1.353×10^{10} ly - 3.38×10^{10} ly	MoM-z14, is the farthest confirmed galaxy discovered as of 2025, with an apparent magnitude of 20.2. It is about 13.53 billion light-years away in light travel distance, and 33.8 billion light-years away in proper distance.
10^{9}	4.57×10^{10} ly	The comoving distance from the Earth to the edge of the visible universe is about 45.7 billion light-years in any direction; this is the comoving radius of the observable universe. This is larger than the age of the universe dictated by the cosmic background radiation; see here for why this is possible.

== Related units ==
Distances between objects within a star system tend to be small fractions of a light-year, and are usually expressed in astronomical units. However, smaller units of length can similarly be formed usefully by multiplying units of time by the speed of light. For example, the light-second, useful in astronomy, telecommunications and relativistic physics, is exactly 299792458 metres or 1/31557600 of a light-year. Units such as the light-minute, light-hour and light-day are sometimes used in popular science publications. The light-month, roughly one-twelfth of a light-year, is also used occasionally for approximate measures. The Hayden Planetarium specifies the light month more precisely as 30 days of light travel time.

Light travels approximately one foot in a nanosecond; the term "light-foot" is sometimes used as an informal measure of time.

== See also ==
- 1 petametre (examples of distances on the order of one light-year)
- Einstein protocol
- Hubble length
- Orders of magnitude (length)
