= Astronomical unit =

Mean distance between Earth and the Sun

astronomical unit
- The grey line indicates the Earth–Sun distance, which on average is about 1 astronomical unit.

General information
- Unit system: Astronomical system of units
- Unit of: length
- Symbol: au, au, AU

Conversions
1 au in ...	... is equal to ...
- SI units: 1.495978707×10^{11} m
- Imperial units: 9.2956×10^{7} mi
- other units: 4.8481×10^{−6} pc 1.5813×10^{−5} ly

The astronomical unit (symbol: au or AU) is a unit of length defined as 149597870700 m, approximately the average Earth-Sun distance (the average of Earth's aphelion and perihelion). The astronomical unit is used primarily for measuring distances within the Solar System or around other stars. It is also a fundamental component in the definition of another unit of astronomical length, the parsec. One au is approximately equivalent to 499 light-seconds.

The first known use of the term "astronomical unit" was in the American Journal of Science in 1848.

== History of symbol usage ==
A variety of unit symbols and abbreviations have been in use for the astronomical unit. In a 1976 resolution, the International Astronomical Union (IAU) had used the symbol A to denote a length equal to the astronomical unit. In the astronomical literature, the symbol AU is common. In 2006, the International Bureau of Weights and Measures (BIPM) had recommended ua as the symbol for the unit, from the French "unité astronomique". In the non-normative Annex C to ISO 80000-3:2006 (later withdrawn), the symbol of the astronomical unit was also ua.

In 2012, the IAU, noting "that various symbols are presently in use for the astronomical unit", recommended the use of the symbol "au". The scientific journals published by the American Astronomical Society and the Royal Astronomical Society subsequently adopted this symbol. The current BIPM document for the SI uses au.

== Relation to Earth's orbit ==
Earth's orbit around the Sun is an ellipse. The semi-major axis of this elliptic orbit is defined to be half of the straight line segment that joins the perihelion and aphelion. The centre of the Sun lies on this straight line segment, but not at its midpoint. Because ellipses are well-understood shapes, measuring the points of its extremes defined the exact shape mathematically, and made possible calculations for the entire orbit as well as predictions based on observation. In addition, it mapped out exactly the largest straight-line distance that Earth traverses over the course of a year, defining times and places for observing the largest parallax (apparent shifts of position) in nearby stars. Knowing Earth's shift and a star's shift enabled the star's distance to be calculated. But all measurements are subject to some degree of error or uncertainty, and the uncertainties in the length of the astronomical unit only increased uncertainties in the stellar distances. Improvements in precision have always been a key to improving astronomical understanding. Throughout the twentieth century, measurements became increasingly precise and sophisticated, and ever more dependent on accurate observation of the effects described by Einstein's theory of relativity and upon the mathematical tools it used.

Improving measurements were continually checked and cross-checked by means of improved understanding of the laws of celestial mechanics, which govern the motions of objects in space. The expected positions and distances of objects at an established time are calculated (in au) from these laws, and assembled into a collection of data called an ephemeris. NASA's Jet Propulsion Laboratory HORIZONS System provides one of several ephemeris computation services.

== Development of unit definition ==
In 1976, to establish a more precise measure for the astronomical unit, the IAU formally adopted a new definition. Although directly based on the then-best available observational measurements, the definition was recast in terms of the then-best mathematical derivations from celestial mechanics and planetary ephemerides. It stated that "the astronomical unit of length is that length (A) for which the Gaussian gravitational constant (k) takes the value 0.01720209895 when the units of measurement are the astronomical units of length, mass and time". Equivalently, by this definition, one au is "the radius of an unperturbed circular Newtonian orbit about the sun of a particle having infinitesimal mass, moving with an angular frequency of 0.01720209895 radians per day"; or alternatively that length for which the heliocentric gravitational constant (the product GM_{☉}) is equal to (0.01720209895)^{2} au^{3}/d^{2}, when the length is used to describe the positions of objects in the Solar System.

Subsequent explorations of the Solar System by space probes made it possible to obtain precise measurements of the relative positions of the inner planets and other objects by means of radar and telemetry. As with all radar measurements, these rely on measuring the time taken for photons to be reflected from an object. Because all photons move at the speed of light in vacuum, a fundamental constant of the universe, the distance of an object from the probe is calculated as the product of the speed of light and the measured time. However, for precision the calculations require adjustment for things such as the motions of the probe and object while the photons are transiting. In addition, the measurement of the time itself must be translated to a standard scale that accounts for relativistic time dilation. Comparison of the ephemeris positions with time measurements expressed in Barycentric Dynamical Time (TDB) leads to a value for the speed of light in astronomical units per day (of 86400 s). In 2009, the IAU reported the "light-time for unit distance" as 173.1446326847(69) au/d (TDB).

In 1983, the BIPM modified the International System of Units (SI) to make the metre defined as the distance travelled in a vacuum by light in 1 / 299792458 s. This replaced the previous definition, valid between 1960 and 1983, which was that the metre equalled a certain number of wavelengths of a certain emission line of krypton-86. (The reason for the change was an improved method of measuring the speed of light.) The speed of light could then be expressed exactly as c_{0} = 299792458 m/s, a standard also adopted by the IERS numerical standards. From this definition and the 2009 IAU standard, the time for light to traverse an astronomical unit is found to be τ_{A} = 499.0047838061±0.00000001 s, which is slightly more than 8 minutes 19 seconds. By multiplication, the best IAU 2009 estimate was A = c_{0}τ_{A} = 149597870700±3 m, based on a comparison of Jet Propulsion Laboratory and IAA–RAS ephemerides.

In 2006, the BIPM reported a value of the astronomical unit as 1.49597870691(6)×10^{11} m. In the 2014 revision of the SI Brochure, the BIPM recognised the IAU's 2012 redefinition of the astronomical unit as 149597870700 m.

This estimate was still derived from observation and measurements subject to error, and based on techniques that did not yet standardize all relativistic effects, and thus were not constant for all observers. In 2012, finding that the equalization of relativity alone would make the definition overly complex, the IAU simply used the 2009 estimate to redefine the astronomical unit as a conventional unit of length directly tied to the metre (exactly 149597870700 m).

1 astronomical unit	= 149597870700 metres (by definition)
1 astronomical unit	= 149,597,870.700 kilometres (exactly)
1 astronomical unit	≈ 92,955,807.2730 miles
1 astronomical unit	≈ 499.004783836 light-seconds
1 astronomical unit	≈ 1.58125074098×10^{−5} light-years
1 astronomical unit	≈ 4.84813681113×10^{−6} parsecs

== Usage and significance ==
With the definitions used before 2012, the astronomical unit was dependent on the heliocentric gravitational constant, that is the product of the gravitational constant, G, and the solar mass, M_{☉}. Neither G nor M_{☉} can be measured to high accuracy separately, but the value of their product is known very precisely from observing the relative positions of planets (Kepler's third law expressed in terms of Newtonian gravitation). Only the product is required to calculate planetary positions for an ephemeris, so ephemerides are calculated in astronomical units and not in SI units.

The calculation of ephemerides also requires a consideration of the effects of general relativity. In particular, time intervals measured on Earth's surface (Terrestrial Time, TT) are not constant when compared with the motions of the planets: the terrestrial second (TT) appears to be longer near January and shorter near July when compared with the "planetary second" (conventionally measured in TDB). This is because the distance between Earth and the Sun is not fixed (it varies between 0.9832898912 and 1.0167103335 au) and, when Earth is closer to the Sun (perihelion), the Sun's gravitational field is stronger and Earth is moving faster along its orbital path. As the metre is defined in terms of the second and the speed of light is constant for all observers, the terrestrial metre appears to change in length compared with the "planetary metre" on a periodic basis.

The metre is defined to be a unit of proper length. Indeed, the International Committee for Weights and Measures (CIPM) notes that "its definition applies only within a spatial extent sufficiently small that the effects of the non-uniformity of the gravitational field can be ignored". As such, a distance within the Solar System without specifying the frame of reference for the measurement is problematic. The 1976 definition of the astronomical unit was incomplete because it did not specify the frame of reference in which to apply the measurement, but proved practical for the calculation of ephemerides: a fuller definition that is consistent with general relativity was proposed, and "vigorous debate" ensued until August 2012 when the IAU adopted the current definition of 1 astronomical unit = 149597870700 metres.

The astronomical unit is typically used for stellar system scale distances, such as the size of a protostellar disk or the heliocentric distance (distance from the Sun's centre) of an asteroid, whereas other units are used for other distances in astronomy. The astronomical unit is too small to be convenient for interstellar distances, where the parsec and light-year are widely used. The parsec (parallax arcsecond) is defined in terms of the astronomical unit, being the distance of an object with a parallax of 1″. The light-year is often used in popular works, but is not an approved non-SI unit and is rarely used by professional astronomers.

When simulating a numerical model of the Solar System, the astronomical unit provides an appropriate scale that minimizes (overflow, underflow and truncation) errors in floating point calculations.

== History ==
Many early measurements of the Earth-Sun distance are wildly incorrect, primarily because the measurements rely on the ratio of the diameter of the Earth to the distance of the Sun. Since this ratio is 1/12000, small errors in the size of the Earth lead to large errors in the Earth-Sun distance.

Around 280 BCE, Aristarchus carefully measured the Moon-Earth-Sun angle when the Moon is in its first quarter and used this to estimate the distance to the Sun. The exact timing and angle measurement are essential. He estimated the angle at as 87° (the true value being close to 89.853°) and reported in On the Sizes and Distances of the Sun and Moon the distance to the Sun is 18 to 20 times the distance to the Moon, whereas the true ratio is about 389.174. Depending on the distance that Aristarchus used for the distance to the Moon, his calculated distance to the Sun would fall between 380 and 1520 Earth radii.

Hipparchus gave an estimate of the distance of Earth from the Sun, quoted by Pappus as equal to 490 Earth radii. According to the conjectural reconstructions of Noel Swerdlow and G. J. Toomer, this was derived from his assumption of a "least perceptible" solar parallax of 7′.

A Chinese mathematical treatise, the Zhoubi Suanjing (c. 1st century BCE), shows how the distance to the Sun can be computed geometrically, using the different lengths of the noontime shadows observed at three places 1000 li apart and the assumption that Earth is flat.

Distance to the Sun estimated by	Estimate		In au	Percentage error
Distance to the Sun estimated by	Solar parallax	Earth radii	In au	Percentage error
Aristarchus (3rd century BCE) (in On Sizes)	13′ 24″–7′ 12″	256.5–477.8	0.011–0.020	−98.9% to −98%
Archimedes (3rd century BCE) (in The Sand Reckoner)	21″	10000	0.426	−57.4%
Hipparchus (2nd century BCE)	7′	490	0.021	−97.9%
Posidonius (1st century BCE) (quoted by coeval Cleomedes)	21″	10000	0.426	−57.4%
Ptolemy (2nd century)	2′ 50″	1210	0.052	−94.8%
Godefroy Wendelin (1635)	15″	14000	0.597	−40.3%
Jeremiah Horrocks (1639)	15″	14000	0.597	−40.3%
Christiaan Huygens (1659)	8.2″	25086	1.068	+6.8%
Cassini & Richer (1672)	9.5″	21700	0.925	−7.5%
Flamsteed (1672)	9.5″	21700	0.925	−7.5%
Jérôme Lalande (1771)	8.6″	24000	1.023	+2.3%
Simon Newcomb (1895)	8.80″	23440	0.9994	−0.06%
Arthur Hinks (1909)	8.807″	23420	0.9985	−0.15%
H. Spencer Jones (1941)	8.790″	23466	1.0005	+0.05%
Modern astronomy	8.794143″	23455	1.0000	

In the 2nd century CE, Ptolemy estimated the mean distance of the Sun as 1210 times Earth's radius. To determine this value, Ptolemy started by measuring the Moon's parallax, finding what amounted to a horizontal lunar parallax of 1° 26′, which was much too large. He then derived a maximum lunar distance of 64 1/6 Earth radii. Because of cancelling errors in his parallax figure, his theory of the Moon's orbit, and other factors, this figure was approximately correct. He then measured the apparent sizes of the Sun and the Moon and concluded that the apparent diameter of the Sun was equal to the apparent diameter of the Moon at the Moon's greatest distance, and from records of lunar eclipses, he estimated this apparent diameter, as well as the apparent diameter of the shadow cone of Earth traversed by the Moon during a lunar eclipse. Given these data, the distance of the Sun from Earth can be trigonometrically computed to be 1210 Earth radii. This gives a ratio of solar to lunar distance of approximately 19, matching Aristarchus's figure. Although Ptolemy's procedure is theoretically workable, it is very sensitive to small changes in the data, so much so that changing a measurement by a few per cent can make the solar distance infinite.

After Greek astronomy was transmitted to the medieval Islamic world, astronomers made some changes to Ptolemy's cosmological model, but did not greatly change his estimate of the Earth–Sun distance. For example, in his introduction to Ptolemaic astronomy, al-Farghānī gave a mean solar distance of 1170 Earth radii, whereas in his zij, al-Battānī used a mean solar distance of 1108 Earth radii. Subsequent astronomers, such as al-Bīrūnī, used similar values. Later in Europe, Copernicus and Tycho Brahe also used comparable figures (1142 and 1150 Earth radii), and so Ptolemy's approximate Earth–Sun distance survived through the 16th century.

By the 17th century the problems with the measurement techniques came to be understood. Johannes Kepler was the first to realize that Ptolemy's estimate must be significantly too low (according to Kepler, at least by a factor of three) in his Rudolphine Tables (1627). Kepler's laws of planetary motion allowed astronomers to calculate the relative distances of the planets from the Sun, and rekindled interest in measuring the absolute value for Earth (which could then be applied to the other planets). The invention of the telescope allowed far more accurate measurements of angles than is possible with the naked eye. Flemish astronomer Godefroy Wendelin repeated Aristarchus' measurements in 1635, and found that Ptolemy's value was too low by a factor of at least eleven.

A somewhat more accurate estimate can be obtained by observing the transit of Venus. By measuring the transit in two different locations, one can accurately calculate the parallax of Venus and from the relative distance of Earth and Venus from the Sun, the solar parallax α (which cannot be measured directly due to the brightness of the Sun). Jeremiah Horrocks had attempted to produce an estimate based on his observation of the 1639 transit (published in 1662), giving a solar parallax of 15″, similar to Wendelin's figure. The solar parallax is related to the Earth–Sun distance as measured in Earth radii by

$$A = \cot\alpha \approx 1\,\textrm{radian}/\alpha.$$

The smaller the solar parallax, the greater the distance between the Sun and Earth: a solar parallax of 15″ is equivalent to an Earth–Sun distance of 13750 Earth radii.

Christiaan Huygens believed that the distance was even greater: by comparing the apparent sizes of Venus and Mars, he estimated a value of about 24000 Earth radii, equivalent to a solar parallax of 8.6″. Although Huygens' estimate is remarkably close to modern values, it is often discounted by historians of astronomy because of the many unproven (and incorrect) assumptions he had to make for his method to work; the accuracy of his value seems to be based more on luck than good measurement, with his various errors cancelling each other out.

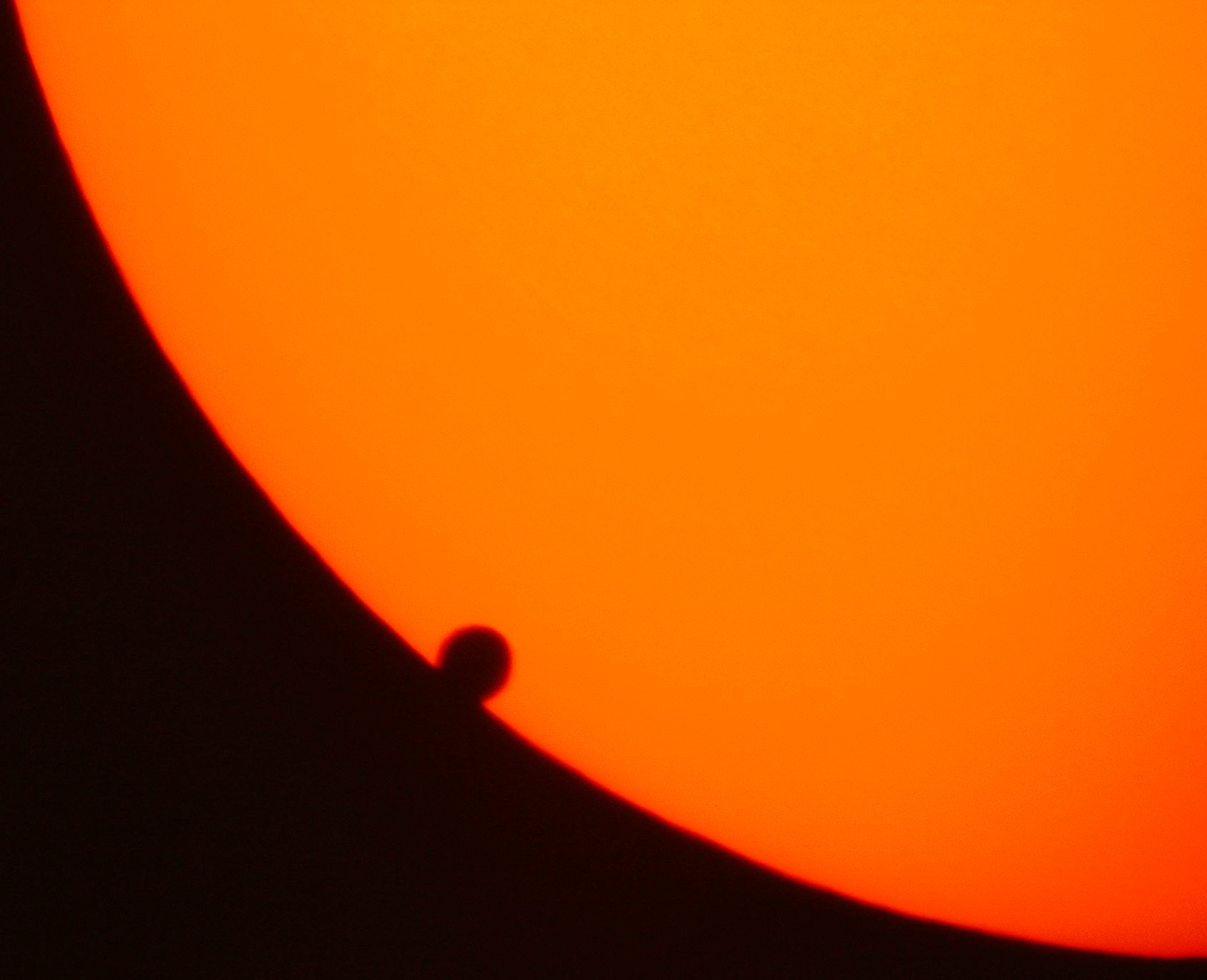
Transits of Venus across the face of the Sun were, for a long time, the best method of measuring the astronomical unit, despite the difficulties (here, the so-called "black drop effect") and the rarity of observations.

Jean Richer and Giovanni Domenico Cassini measured the parallax of Mars between Paris and Cayenne in French Guiana when Mars was at its closest to Earth in 1672. They arrived at a figure for the solar parallax of 9.5″, equivalent to an Earth–Sun distance of about 22000 Earth radii. They were also the first astronomers to have access to an accurate and reliable value for the radius of Earth, which had been measured by their colleague Jean Picard in 1669 as 3269000 toises. This same year saw another estimate for the astronomical unit by John Flamsteed, which accomplished it alone by measuring the martian diurnal parallax. Another colleague, Ole Rømer, discovered the finite speed of light in 1676: the speed was so great that it was usually quoted as the time required for light to travel from the Sun to the Earth, or "light time per unit distance", a convention that is still followed by astronomers today.

A better method for observing Venus transits was devised by James Gregory and published in his Optica Promata (1663). It was strongly advocated by Edmond Halley and was applied to the transits of Venus observed in 1761 and 1769, and then again in 1874 and 1882. Transits of Venus occur in pairs, but less than one pair every century, and observing the transits in 1761 and 1769 was an unprecedented international scientific operation including observations by James Cook and Charles Green from Tahiti. Despite the Seven Years' War, dozens of astronomers were dispatched to observing points around the world at great expense and personal danger: several of them died in the endeavour. The various results were collated by Jérôme Lalande to give a figure for the solar parallax of 8.6″. Karl Rudolph Powalky had made an estimate of 8.83″ in 1864.

Date	Method	A/Gm	Uncertainty
1895	aberration	149.25	0.12
1941	parallax	149.674	0.016
1964	radar	149.5981	0.001
1976	telemetry	149.597870	0.000001
2009	telemetry	149.597870700	0.000000003

Another method involved determining the constant of aberration. Simon Newcomb gave great weight to this method when deriving his widely accepted value of 8.80″ for the solar parallax (close to the modern value of 8.794143″), although Newcomb also used data from the transits of Venus. Newcomb also collaborated with A. A. Michelson to measure the speed of light with Earth-based equipment; combined with the constant of aberration (which is related to the light time per unit distance), this gave the first direct measurement of the Earth–Sun distance in metres. Newcomb's value for the solar parallax (and for the constant of aberration and the Gaussian gravitational constant) were incorporated into the first international system of astronomical constants in 1896, which remained in place for the calculation of ephemerides until 1964.

The discovery of the near-Earth asteroid 433 Eros and its passage near Earth in 1900–1901 allowed a considerable improvement in parallax measurement. Another international project to measure the parallax of 433 Eros was undertaken in 1930–1931.

Direct radar measurements of the distances to Venus and Mars became available in the early 1960s. Along with improved measurements of the speed of light, these showed that Newcomb's values for the solar parallax and the constant of aberration were inconsistent with one another.

== Developments ==
The astronomical unit is used as the baseline of the triangle to measure stellar parallaxes (distances in the image are not to scale)

The unit distance A (the value of the astronomical unit in metres) can be expressed in terms of other astronomical constants:

$$A^3 = \frac{G M_\odot D^2}{k^2},$$

where G is the Newtonian constant of gravitation, M_{☉} is the solar mass, k is the numerical value of Gaussian gravitational constant and D is the time period of one day. The Sun is constantly losing mass by radiating away energy, so the orbits of the planets are steadily expanding outward from the Sun. This has led to calls to abandon the astronomical unit as a unit of measurement.

As the speed of light has an exact defined value in SI units and the Gaussian gravitational constant k is fixed in the astronomical system of units, measuring the light time per unit distance is exactly equivalent to measuring the product G×M_{☉} in SI units. Hence, it is possible to construct ephemerides entirely in SI units, which is increasingly becoming the norm.

A 2004 analysis of radiometric measurements in the inner Solar System suggested that the secular increase in the unit distance was much larger than can be accounted for by solar radiation, +15±4 metres per century.

The measurements of the secular variations of the astronomical unit are not confirmed by other authors and are quite controversial. Furthermore, since 2010, the astronomical unit has not been estimated by the planetary ephemerides.

== Examples ==
The following table contains some distances given in astronomical units. It includes some examples with distances that are normally not given in astronomical units, because they are either too short or far too long. Distances normally change over time. Examples are listed by increasing distance.

Object or length	Length or distance in au	Range	Comment and reference point	Refs
Light-second	0.002	—	Distance light travels in one second	—
Lunar distance	0.0026	—	Average distance from Earth (which the Apollo missions took about 3 days to travel)	—
Solar radius	0.005	—	Radius of the Sun (695500 km, 432450 mi, a hundred times the radius of Earth or ten times the average radius of Jupiter)	—
Light-minute	0.12	—	Distance light travels in one minute	—
Mercury	0.39	—	Average distance from the Sun	—
Venus	0.72	—	Average distance from the Sun	—
Earth	1.00	—	Average distance of Earth's orbit from the Sun (sunlight travels for 8 minutes and 19 seconds before reaching Earth)	—
Mars	1.52	—	Average distance from the Sun	—
Jupiter	5.2	—	Average distance from the Sun	—
Light-hour	7.2	—	Distance light travels in one hour	—
Saturn	9.5	—	Average distance from the Sun	—
Uranus	19.2	—	Average distance from the Sun	—
Kuiper belt	30	—	Inner edge begins at approximately 30 au	
Neptune	30.1	—	Average distance from the Sun	—
Eris	67.8	—	Average distance from the Sun	—
Voyager 2	145	—	Distance from the Sun in November 2026	
Voyager 1	172	—	Distance from the Sun in November 2026	
Light-day	173	—	Distance light travels in one day	—
Sedna (aphelion)	937	—	Distance to the farthest point of the orbit from the Sun	—
Light-year	63241	—	Distance light travels in one Julian year (365.25 days)	—
Oort cloud	75000	± 25000	Distance of the outer limit of Oort cloud from the Sun (estimated, corresponds to 1.2 light-years)	—
Parsec	206265	—	One parsec. The parsec is defined in terms of the astronomical unit, is used to measure distances beyond the scope of the Solar System and is about 3.26 light-years: 1 pc = 1 au/tan(1″)	
Proxima Centauri	268000	± 126	Distance to the nearest star to the Solar System	—
Galactic Centre of the Milky Way	1700000000	—	Distance from the Sun to the centre of the Milky Way	—
Note: Figures in this table are generally rounded estimates, often rough estimates, and may considerably differ from other sources. Table also includes other units of length for comparison.

== See also ==
- Orders of magnitude (length)
