= Earth's orbit =

Trajectory of Earth around the Sun

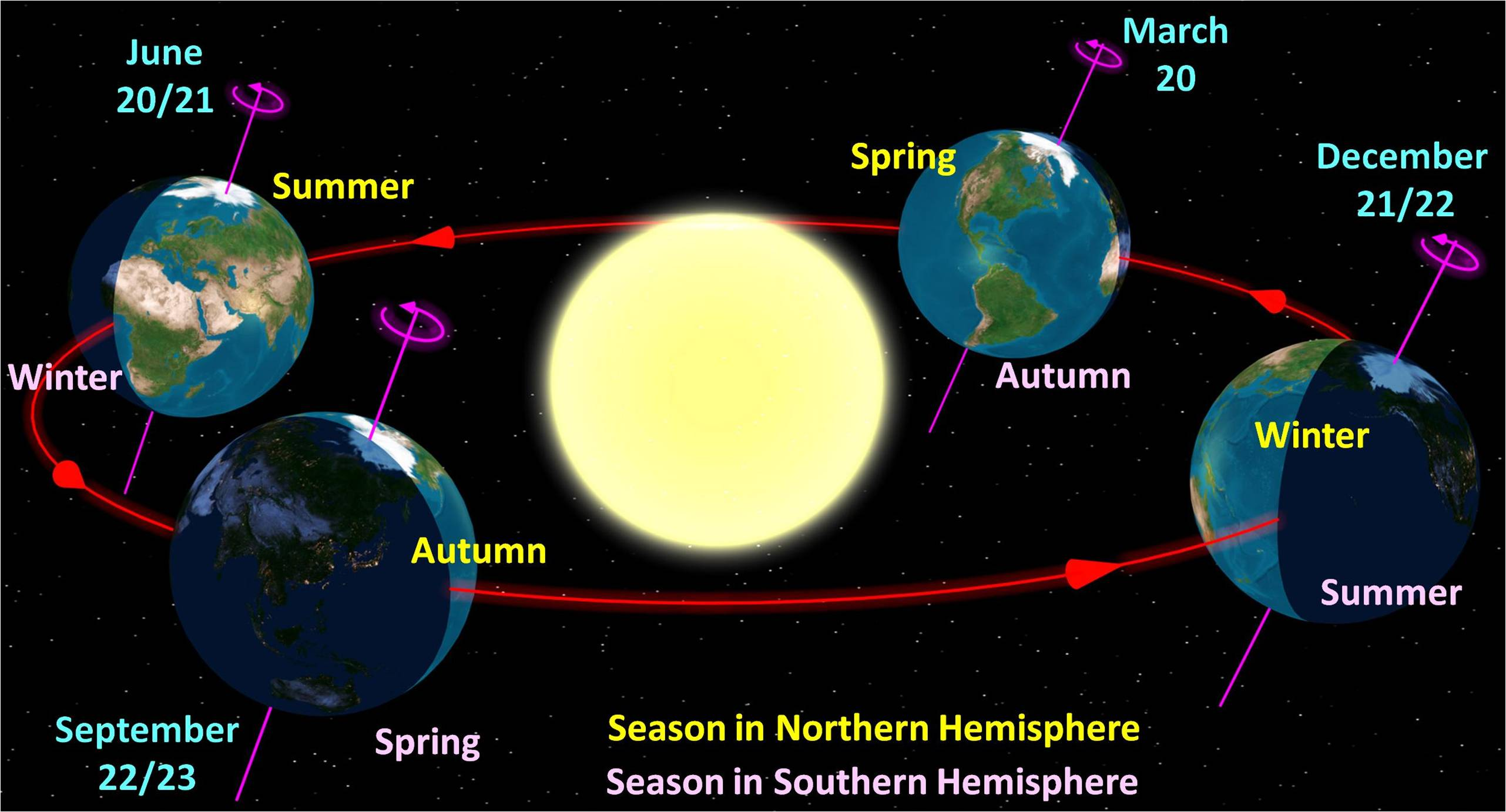
Earth at seasonal points in its orbit (not to scale)

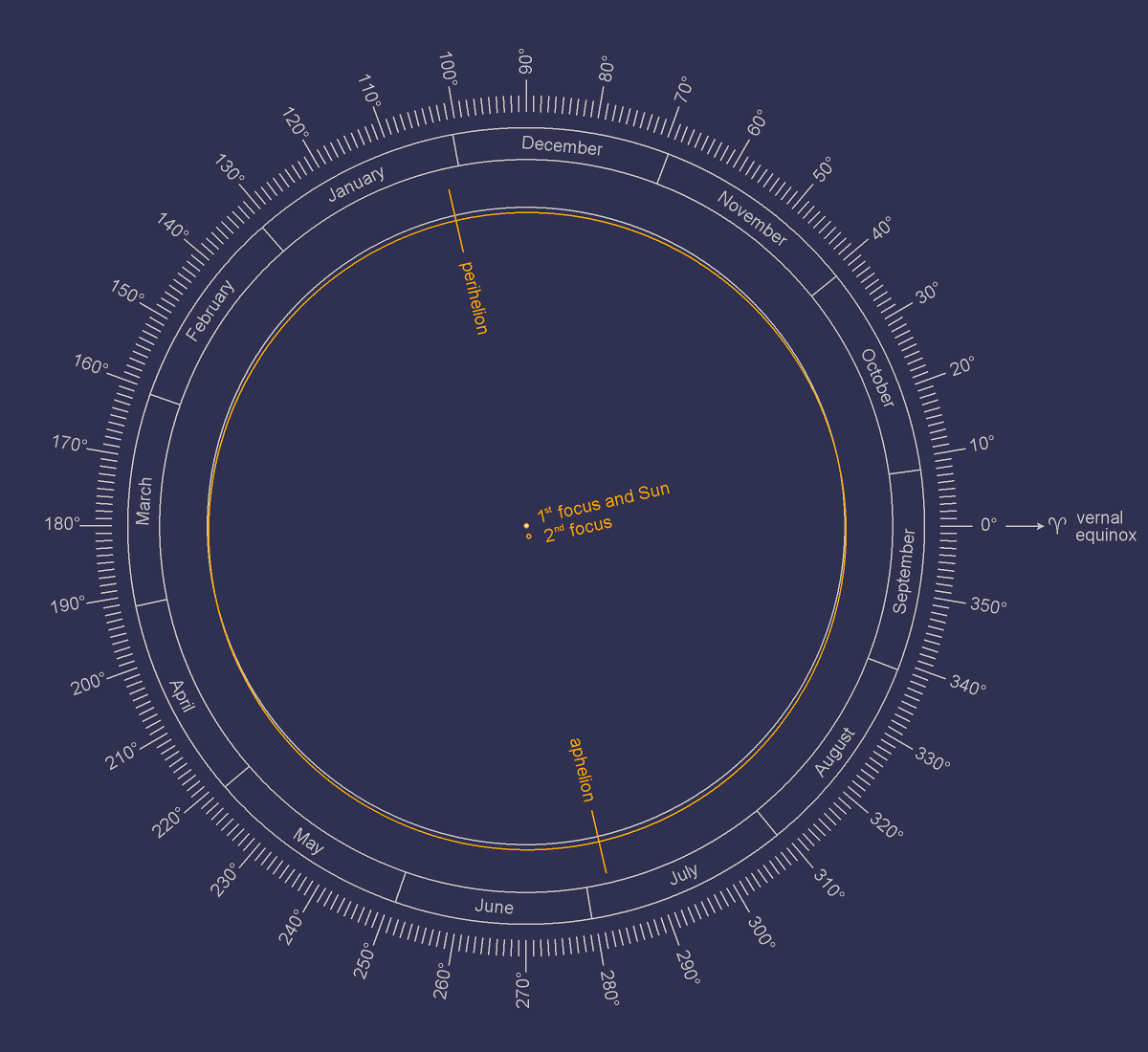
Earth orbit (yellow) compared to a circle (gray)

Earth orbits the Sun at an average distance of 149.60 million km (92.96 million mi), or 8.317 light-minutes, in a counterclockwise direction as viewed from above the Northern Hemisphere. One complete orbit takes 365.256 days (1 sidereal year), during which time Earth has traveled 940 million km (584 million mi). Ignoring the influence of other Solar System bodies, Earth's orbit, also called Earth's revolution, is an ellipse with the Earth–Sun barycenter as one focus with a current eccentricity of 0.0167. Since this value is close to zero, the center of the orbit is relatively close to the center of the Sun (relative to the size of the orbit). (Note: The Sun's orbit relative to the Solar System's barycenter (the point often used as a coordinate origin) is nearly periodic over 179 years, varying between about 70,000 km and 1,500,000 km from the barycenter))

As seen from Earth, the planet's orbital prograde motion makes the Sun appear to move with respect to other stars at a rate of about 1° eastward per solar day (or a Sun or Moon diameter every 12 hours). (Note: Earth takes about 365 days to orbit the Sun. A full orbit has 360°. That fact demonstrates that each day, Earth travels roughly 1° in its orbit. Thus, the Sun will appear to move across the sky relative to the stars by that same amount.) Earth's orbital speed averages 29.78 km/s (18.50 mi/s; 107,208.00 km/h; 66,615.96 mph), which is fast enough to cover the planet's diameter in 7 minutes and the distance to the Moon in 4 hours. The point towards which the Earth in its solar orbit is directed at any given instant is known as the "apex of the Earth's way".

From a vantage point above the north pole of either the Sun or Earth, Earth would appear to revolve in a counterclockwise direction around the Sun. From the same vantage point, both the Earth and the Sun would appear to rotate in a counterclockwise direction.

== History of study ==
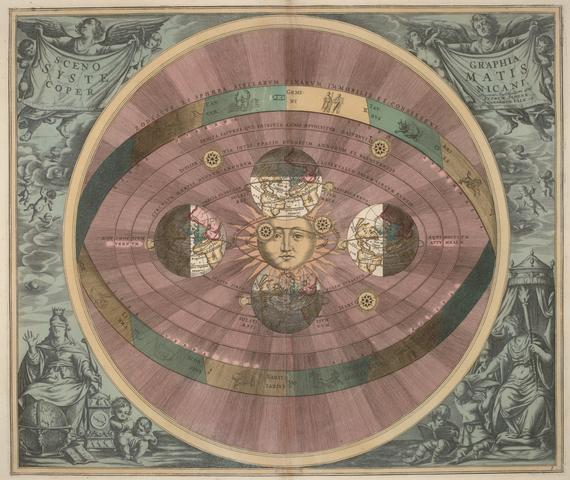
Heliocentric Solar System

Heliocentrism (lower panel) in comparison to the geocentric model (upper panel), not to scale

Heliocentrism is the scientific model that first placed the Sun at the center of the Solar System and put the planets, including Earth, in its orbit. Historically, heliocentrism is opposed to geocentrism, which placed the Earth at the center. Aristarchus of Samos already proposed a heliocentric model in the third century BC. In the sixteenth century, Nicolaus Copernicus' De revolutionibus presented a full discussion of a heliocentric model of the universe in much the same way as Ptolemy had presented his geocentric model in the second century. This "Copernican Revolution" resolved the issue of planetary retrograde motion by arguing that such motion was only perceived and apparent. According to historian Jerry Brotton, "Although Copernicus's groundbreaking book ... had been [printed more than] a century earlier, [the Dutch mapmaker] Joan Blaeu was the first mapmaker to incorporate his revolutionary heliocentric theory into a map of the world."

== Influence on Earth ==
Because of Earth's axial tilt (often known as the obliquity of the ecliptic), the inclination of the Sun's trajectory in the sky (as seen by an observer on Earth's surface) varies over the course of the year. For an observer at a northern latitude, when the north pole is tilted toward the Sun the day lasts longer and the Sun appears higher in the sky. This results in warmer average temperatures, as additional solar radiation reaches the surface. When the north pole is tilted away from the Sun, the reverse is true and the weather is generally cooler. North of the Arctic Circle and south of the Antarctic Circle, an extreme case is reached in which there is no daylight at all for part of the year, and continuous daylight during the opposite time of year. This is called polar night and midnight sun, respectively. This variation in the weather (because of the direction of the Earth's axial tilt) results in the seasons.

== Events in the orbit ==
By astronomical convention, the four seasons are determined by the solstices (the two points in the Earth's orbit of the maximum tilt of the Earth's axis, toward the Sun or away from the Sun) and the equinoxes (the two points in the Earth's orbit where the Earth's tilted axis and an imaginary line drawn from the Earth to the Sun are exactly perpendicular to one another). The solstices and equinoxes divide the year up into four approximately equal parts. In the Northern Hemisphere winter solstice occurs on or about 21 December; summer solstice is near 21 June; spring equinox is around 20 March, and autumnal equinox is about 23 September. In the Southern Hemisphere, Earth's axial tilt has the opposite effect, so solstice and equinox seasons are the reverse of those in the Northern Hemisphere (e.g. the northern summer solstice is at the same time as the southern winter solstice).

In modern times, Earth's perihelion occurs around 3 January, and the aphelion around 4 July. Earth is nearest the Sun in January and farthest in July; thus the Northern Hemisphere is coldest when Earth is nearest and warmest when it is farthest. The changing Earth-Sun distance results in an increase of about 7% in total solar energy reaching the Earth at perihelion relative to aphelion. Since the Southern Hemisphere is tilted toward the Sun at about the same time that the Earth reaches the closest approach to the Sun, the Southern Hemisphere receives slightly more energy from the Sun than does the northern over the course of a year. However, this effect is much less significant than the total energy change due to the axial tilt, and most of the excess energy is absorbed by the higher proportion of surface covered by water in the southern hemisphere.

The Hill sphere (gravitational sphere of influence) of the Earth is about 1,500,000 kilometers (0.01 AU) in radius, or approximately four times the average distance to the Moon. (Note: For the Earth, the Hill radius is $$R_H = a \left(\frac{m}{3M}\right)^{1/3},$$ where m is the mass of the Earth, a is an astronomical unit, and M is the mass of the Sun. So the radius in AU is about $\left(\frac{1}{3 \cdot 332\,946}\right)^{1/3} \approx 0.01$.) This is the maximal distance at which the Earth's gravitational influence is stronger than the more distant Sun and planets. Objects orbiting the Earth must be within this radius, otherwise, they may become unbound by the gravitational perturbation of the Sun.

Orbital characteristics
epoch	J2000.0 (Note: All astronomical quantities vary, both secularly and periodically. The quantities given are the values at the instant J2000.0 of the secular variation, ignoring all periodic variations.)
aphelion	152.10×10^{6} km (94.51×10^{6} mi); 1.0167 AU (Note: aphelion = a × (1 + e); perihelion = a × (1 – e), where a is the semi-major axis and e is the eccentricity.)
perihelion	147.10×10^{6} km (91.40×10^{6} mi); 0.98329 AU
semimajor axis	149.60×10^{6} km (92.96×10^{6} mi); 1.0000010178 AU
eccentricity	0.0167086
inclination	7.155° to Sun's equator 1.578690° to invariable plane
longitude of the ascending node	174.9°
longitude of perihelion	102.9°
argument of periapsis	288.1° (Note: The reference lists the longitude of perihelion, which is the sum of the longitude of the ascending node and the argument of perihelion. Subtracting from that (102.937°) the node longitude of 174.873° gives −71.936°. Adding 360° gives 288.064°. That addition does not change the angle but expresses it in the usual 0–360° range for longitudes.)
period	365.256363004 days
average orbital speed	29.78 km/s (18.50 mi/s); 107,208 km/h (66,616 mph)
speed at aphelion	29.29 km/s (18.20 mi/s)
speed at perihelion	30.29 km/s (18.82 mi/s)

The following diagram illustrates the positions and relationship between the lines of solstices, equinoxes, and apsides of Earth's elliptical orbit. The six Earth images are positions along the orbital ellipse, which are sequentially the perihelion (periapsis—nearest point to the Sun) on anywhere from 2 to 5 January, the point of March equinox on 19, 20, or 21 March, the point of June solstice on 20, 21, or 22 June, the aphelion (apoapsis—the farthest point from the Sun) on anywhere from 3 to 5 July, the September equinox on 22, 23, or 24 September, and the December solstice on 21, 22, or 23 December.

Exaggerated illustration of Earth's elliptical orbit around the Sun, marking that the orbital extreme points (apoapsis and periapsis) are not the same as the four seasonal extreme points (equinox and solstice)

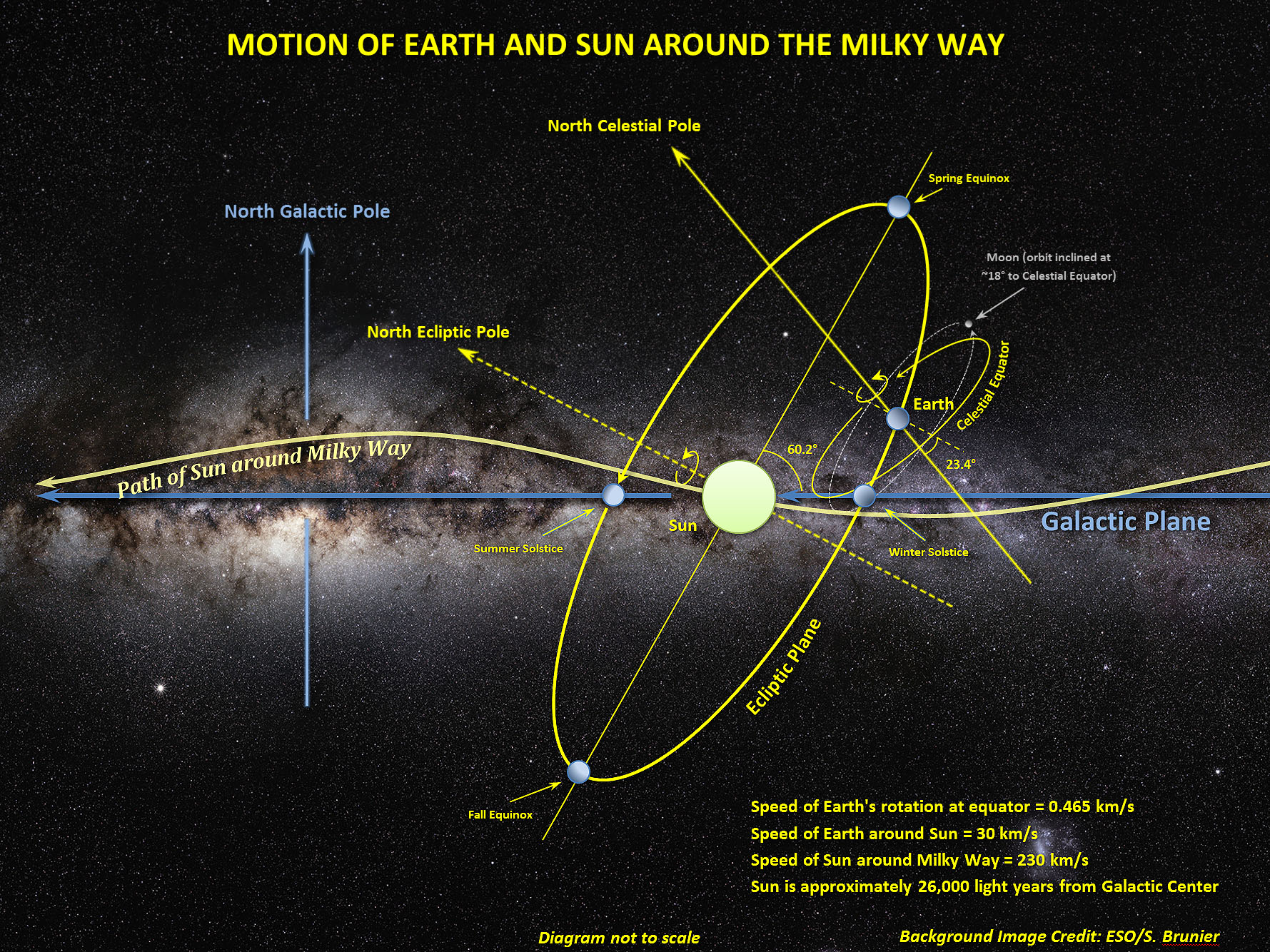
The orientation of the motion of Earth, Moon and the Sun

== Future ==
Mathematicians and astronomers (such as Laplace, Lagrange, Gauss, Poincaré, Kolmogorov, Vladimir Arnold, and Jürgen Moser) have searched for evidence for the stability of the planetary motions, and this quest led to many mathematical developments and several successive "proofs" of stability for the Solar System. By most predictions, Earth's orbit will be relatively stable over long periods.

In 1989, Jacques Laskar's work indicated that Earth's orbit (as well as the orbits of all the inner planets) can become chaotic and that an error as small as 15 meters in measuring the initial position of the Earth today would make it impossible to predict where Earth would be in its orbit in just over 100 million years' time. Modeling the Solar System is a subject covered by the n-body problem.

== See also ==
- Calendar – System for organizing days
- Earth phase – Phases of Earth as seen from the Moon
- Earth's rotation – Rotation of Earth around its axis
- Ecliptic – Apparent path of the Sun on the celestial sphere
- Spaceship Earth – Worldview of Earth as an enclosed biosystem
