= Gaussian gravitational constant =

Constant used in orbital mechanics

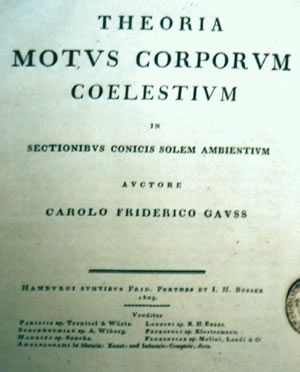
Carl Friedrich Gauss introduced his constant to the world in his 1809 Theoria Motus.

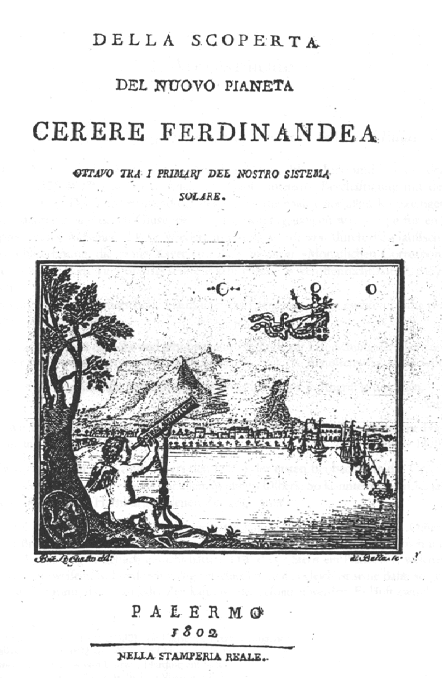
Piazzi's discovery of Ceres, described in his book the discovery a new planet Ceres Ferdinandea, demonstrated the utility of the Gaussian gravitation constant in predicting the positions of objects within the Solar System.

The Gaussian gravitational constant (symbol k) is a parameter used in the orbital mechanics of the Solar System. It relates the orbital period to the orbit's semi-major axis and the mass of the orbiting body in Solar masses.

The value of k historically expresses the mean angular velocity of the system of Earth + Moon and the Sun considered as a two-body problem, with a value of about 0.986 degrees per day, or about 0.0172 radians per day. As a consequence of the law of gravitation and Kepler's third law, k is directly proportional to the square root of the standard gravitational parameter of the Sun, and its value in radians per day follows by setting Earth's semi-major axis (the astronomical unit, au) to unity, k [rad/d] = (GM_{☉})^{0.5}·au^{−1.5}.

A value of k = 0.01720209895 rad/day was determined by Carl Friedrich Gauss in his 1809 work Theoria Motus Corporum Coelestium in Sectionibus Conicis Solem Ambientum ("Theory of the Motion of the Heavenly Bodies Moving about the Sun in Conic Sections"). Gauss's value was introduced as a fixed, defined value by the IAU (adopted in 1938, formally defined in 1964), which detached it from its immediate representation of the (observable) mean angular velocity of the Sun–Earth system. Instead, the astronomical unit now became a measurable quantity slightly different from unity. This was useful in 20th-century celestial mechanics to prevent the constant adaptation of orbital parameters to updated measured values, but it came at the expense of intuitiveness, as the astronomical unit, ostensibly a unit of length, was now dependent on the measurement of the strength of the gravitational force.

The IAU abandoned the defined value of k in 2012 in favour of a defined value of the astronomical unit of 1.49597870700×10^{11} m exactly, while the strength of the gravitational force is now to be expressed in the separate standard gravitational parameter GM_{☉}, measured in SI units of m^{3}⋅s^{−2}.

== Discussion ==
Gauss's constant is derived from the application of Kepler's third law to the system of Earth+Moon and the Sun considered as a two-body problem, relating the period of revolution (P) to the major semi-axis of the orbit (a) and the total mass of the orbiting bodies (M). Its numerical value was obtained by setting the major semi-axis and the mass of the Sun to unity and measuring the period in mean solar days:

k = 2π √a^{3} / (P √M ) ≈ 0.0172021 [rad], where:
P ≈ 365.256 [days], M = (M_{☉}+M_{🜨}+M_{☾}) ≈ 1.00000304 [M_{☉}], and a = 1 by definition.

The value represents the mean angular motion of the Earth-Sun system, in radians per day, equivalent to a value just below one degree (the division of the circle into 360 degrees in Babylonian astronomy was likely intended as approximating the number of days in a solar year). The correction due to the division by the square root of M reflects the fact that the Earth–Moon system is not orbiting the Sun itself, but the center of mass of the system.

Isaac Newton himself determined a value of this constant which agreed with Gauss's value to six significant digits. Gauss (1809) gave the value with nine significant digits, as 3548.18761 arc seconds.

Since all involved parameters, the orbital period, the Earth-to-Sun mass ratio, the semi-major axis and the length of the mean solar day, are subject to increasingly refined measurement, the precise value of the constant would have to be revised over time. But since the constant is involved in determining the orbital parameters of all other bodies in the Solar System, it was found to be more convenient to set it to a fixed value, by definition, implying that the value of a would deviate from unity. The fixed value of k = 0.01720209895 [rad] was taken to be the one set by Gauss (converted from degrees to radian), so that a = 4π^{2}:(k^{2} P^{2} M) ≈ 1.

Gauss's 1809 value of the constant was thus used as an authoritative reference value for the orbital mechanics of the Solar System for two centuries. From its introduction until 1938 it was considered a measured quantity, and from 1938 until 2012 it was used as a defined quantity, with measurement uncertainty delegated to the value of the astronomical unit. The defined value of k was abandoned by the IAU in 2012, and the use of k was deprecated, to be replaced by a fixed value of the astronomical unit, and the (measured) quantity of the standard gravitational parameter GM_{☉}.

=== Role as a defining constant of Solar System dynamics ===
Gauss himself stated the constant in arc seconds, with nine significant digits, as k = 3548″.18761. In the late 19th century, this value was adopted, and converted to radian, by Simon Newcomb, as k = 0.01720209895. and the constant appears in this form in his Tables of the Sun, published in 1898.

Newcomb's work was widely accepted as the best then available and his values of the constants were incorporated into a great quantity of astronomical research. Because of this, it became difficult to separate the constants from the research; new values of the constants would, at least partially, invalidate a large body of work. Hence, after the formation of the International Astronomical Union in 1919 certain constants came to be gradually accepted as "fundamental": defining constants from which all others were derived. In 1938, the VIth General Assembly of the IAU declared,

We adopt for the constant of Gauss, the value

k = 0.017202098950000

the unit of time is the mean solar day of 1900.0

However, no further effort toward establishing a set of constants was forthcoming until 1950. An IAU symposium on the system of constants was held in Paris in 1963, partially in response to recent developments in space exploration. The attendees finally decided at that time to establish a consistent set of constants. Resolution 1 stated that

The new system shall be defined by a non-redundant set of fundamental constants, and by explicit relations between these and the constants derived from them.

Resolution 4 recommended

that the working group shall treat the following quantities as fundamental constants (in the sense of Resolution No. 1).

Included in the list of fundamental constants was

The gaussian constant of gravitation, as defined by the VIth General Assembly of the I.A.U. in 1938, having the value 0.017202098950000.

These resolutions were taken up by a working group of the IAU, who in their report recommended two defining constants, one of which was

Gaussian gravitational constant, defining the au k = 0.01720209895

For the first time, the Gaussian constant's role in the scale of the Solar System was officially recognized. The working group's recommendations were accepted at the XIIth General Assembly of the IAU at Hamburg, Germany in 1964.

==== Definition of the astronomical unit ====
Gauss intended his constant to be defined using a mean distance (Note: Historically, the term mean distance was used interchangeably with the elliptical parameter the semi-major axis. It does not refer to an actual average distance.) of Earth from the Sun of 1 astronomical unit precisely. With the acceptance of the 1964 resolutions, the IAU, in effect, did the opposite: defined the constant as fundamental, and the astronomical unit as derived, the other variables in the definition being already fixed: mass (of the Sun), and time (the day of 86400 seconds). This transferred the uncertainty from the gravitational constant to uncertainty in the semi-major axis of the Earth-Sun system, which was no longer exactly one au (the au being defined as depending on the value of the gravitational constant). The astronomical unit thus became a measured quantity rather than a defined, fixed one.

In 1976, the IAU reconfirmed the Gaussian constant's status at the XVIth General Assembly in Grenoble, declaring it to be a defining constant, and that

The astronomical unit of length is that length (A) for which the Gaussian gravitational constant (k) takes the value 0.01720209895 when the units of measurement are the astronomical units of length, mass and time. The dimensions of k^{2} are those of the constant of gravitation (G), i.e., T^{−2}L^{3}M^{−1}. The term "unit distance" is also used for the length (A).

From this definition, the mean distance of Earth from the Sun works out to 1.000 000 03 au, but with perturbations by the other planets, which do not average to zero over time, the average distance is 1.000 000 20 au.

==== Abandonment ====
In 2012, the IAU, as part of a new, self-consistent set of units and numerical standards for use in modern dynamical astronomy, redefined the astronomical unit as

a conventional unit of length equal to 149597870700 m exactly, ... ... considering that the accuracy of modern range measurements makes the use of distance ratios unnecessary

and hence abandoned the Gaussian constant as an indirect definition of scale in the Solar System, recommending

that the Gaussian gravitational constant k be deleted from the system of astronomical constants.

The value of k based on the defined value for the astronomical unit would now be subject to the measurement uncertainty of the standard gravitational parameter, $k = \sqrt{G M_\odot } \cdot \text{au}^{-1.5} \cdot \text{d} = {1.32712440018(9)}^{0.5} \cdot 1.495978707^{-1.5} \cdot 8.64 \cdot 10^{-2.5} = 0.0172020989484(6).$

=== Units and dimensions ===
k is given as a unit-less fraction of the order of 1.7%, but it can be considered equivalent to the square root of the gravitational constant, in which case it has the units of au^{3/2}⋅d^{−1}⋅M_{☉}^{−1/2}, where

au is the distance for which k takes its value as defined by Gauss—the distance of the unperturbed circular orbit of a hypothetical, massless body whose orbital period is 2π/k days,
d is the mean solar day (86,400 seconds),
M_{☉} is the mass of the Sun.

Therefore, the dimensions of k are

length^{3/2} time^{−1} mass^{−1/2} or L^{3/2} T^{−1} M^{−1/2}.

In spite of this k is known to much greater accuracy than G (or the square root of G). The absolute value of G is known to an accuracy of about 10^{−4}, but the product GM_{☉} (the gravitational parameter of the Sun) is known to an accuracy better than 10^{−10}.

== Derivation ==
=== Gauss's original ===
Gauss begins his Theoria Motus by presenting without proof several laws concerning the motion of bodies about the Sun. Later in the text, he mentions that Pierre-Simon Laplace treats these in detail in his Mécanique Céleste. Gauss's final two laws are as follows:

- The area swept by a line joining a body and the Sun divided by the time in which it is swept gives a constant quotient. This is Kepler's second law of planetary motion.
- The square of this quotient is proportional to the parameter (that is, the latus rectum) of the orbit and the sum of the mass of the Sun and the body. This is a modified form of Kepler's third law.

He next defines:

- 2p as the parameter (i.e., the latus rectum) of a body's orbit,
- μ as the mass of the body, where the mass of the Sun = 1,
- 1/2g as the area swept out by a line joining the Sun and the body,
- t as the time in which this area is swept,

and declares that

$$\frac{g}{t\sqrt{p}\sqrt{1+\mu}}$$

is "constant for all heavenly bodies". He continues, "it is of no importance which body we use for determining this number," and hence uses Earth, defining

- unit distance = Earth's mean distance (that is, its semi-major axis) from the Sun,
- unit time = one solar day.

He states that the area swept out by Earth in its orbit "will evidently be" π√p, and uses this to simplify his constant to

$$\frac{2\pi}{t\sqrt{1+\mu}}.$$

Here, he names the constant k and plugging in some measured values, t = 365.2563835 days, μ = 1/354710 solar masses, achieves the result k = 0.01720209895.

=== In modern terms ===
Gauss is notorious for leaving out details, and this derivation is no exception. It is here repeated in modern terms, filling out some of the details.

Define without proof

$$h=2\frac{dA}{dt},$$

where

- dA/dt is the time rate of sweep of area by a body in its orbit, a constant according to Kepler's second law, and
- h is the specific angular momentum, one of the constants of two-body motion.

Next define

$$h^2=\mu p,$$

where

- μ = G(M + m), a gravitational parameter, (Note: Do not confuse μ the gravitational parameter with Gauss's notation for the mass of the body.) where
  - G is Newton's gravitational constant,
  - M is the mass of the primary body (i.e., the Sun),
  - m is the mass of the secondary body (i.e., a planet), and
- p is the semi-parameter (the semi-latus rectum) of the body's orbit.

Note that every variable in the above equations is a constant for two-body motion. Combining these two definitions,

$$\left(2\frac{dA}{dt}\right)^2=G(M+m)p,$$

which is what Gauss was describing with the last of his laws. Taking the square root,

$$2\frac{dA}{dt}=\sqrt{G}\sqrt{M+m}\sqrt{p},$$

and solving for √G,

$$\sqrt{G}=\frac{2dA}{dt\sqrt{M+m}\sqrt{p}}.$$

At this point, define k ≡ √G. Let dA be the entire area swept out by the body as it orbits, hence dA = πab, the area of an ellipse, where a is the semi-major axis and b is the semi-minor axis. Let dt = P, the time for the body to complete one orbit. Thus,

$$k=\frac{2\pi ab}{P\sqrt{M+m}\sqrt{p}}.$$

Here, Gauss decides to use Earth to solve for k. From the geometry of an ellipse, p = b^{2}/a. By setting Earth's semi-major axis, a = 1, p reduces to b^{2} and √p = b. Substituting, the area of the ellipse "is evidently" π√p, rather than πab. Putting this into the numerator of the equation for k and reducing,

$$k=\frac{2\pi}{P\sqrt{M+m}}.$$

Note that Gauss, by normalizing the size of the orbit, has eliminated it completely from the equation. Normalizing further, set the mass of the Sun to 1,

$$k=\frac{2\pi}{P\sqrt{1+m}},$$

where now m is in solar masses. What is left are two quantities: P, the period of Earth's orbit or the sidereal year, a quantity known precisely by measurement over centuries, and m, the mass of the Earth–Moon system. Again plugging in the measured values as they were known in Gauss's time, P = 365.2563835 days, m = 1/354710 solar masses, yielding the result k = 0.01720209895.

=== Gauss's constant and Kepler's third law ===
The Gaussian constant is closely related to Kepler's third law of planetary motion, and one is easily derived from the other. Beginning with the full definition of Gauss's constant,

$$k=\frac{2\pi ab}{P\sqrt{M+m}\sqrt{p}},$$

where

- a is the semi-major axis of the elliptical orbit,
- b is the semi-minor axis of the elliptical orbit,
- P is the orbital period,
- M is the mass of the primary body,
- m is the mass of the secondary body, and
- p is the semi-latus rectum of the elliptical orbit.

From the geometry of an ellipse, the semi-latus rectum, p can be expressed in terms of a and b thus: p = b^{2}/a. Therefore,

$$\sqrt{p}=\frac{b}{\sqrt{a}}.$$

Substituting and reducing, Gauss's constant becomes

$$k=\frac{2\pi}{P}\sqrt{\frac{a^3}{M+m}}.$$

From orbital mechanics, 2π/P is just n, the mean motion of the body in its orbit. Hence,

$$\begin{align}
k&=n\sqrt{\frac{a^3}{M+m}},\\[8pt]
k^2&=\frac{n^2a^3}{M+m},\\[8pt]
k^2(M+m)&=n^2a^3,
\end{align}$$

which is the definition of Kepler's third law. In this form, it is often seen with G, the Newtonian gravitational constant in place of k^{2}.

Setting a = 1, M = 1, m ≪ M, and n in radians per day results in k ≈ n, also in units of radians per day, about which see the relevant section of the mean motion article.

== Other definitions ==
The value of Gauss's constant, exactly as he derived it, had been used since Gauss's time because it was held to be a fundamental constant, as described above. The solar mass, mean solar day and sidereal year with which Gauss defined his constant are all slowly changing in value. If more modern values were inserted into the defining equation, a value of something close to 0.01720209789 would result.

It is also possible to set the gravitational constant, the mass of the Sun, and the astronomical unit to 1. This defines a unit of time with which the period of the resulting orbit is equal to 2π. These are often called canonical units.

== See also ==
- Gravitational constant
- Standard gravitational parameter
- Kepler's laws of planetary motion
- Mean motion
