= Astronomical constant =

Any of several physical constants used in astronomy

An astronomical constant is any of several physical constants used in astronomy. Formal sets of constants, along with recommended values, have been defined by the International Astronomical Union (IAU) several times: in 1964 and in 1976 (with an update in 1994). In 2009 the IAU adopted a new current set, and recognizing that new observations and techniques continuously provide better values for these constants, they decided to not fix these values, but have the Working Group on Numerical Standards continuously maintain a set of Current Best Estimates. The set of constants is widely reproduced in publications such as the Astronomical Almanac of the United States Naval Observatory and HM Nautical Almanac Office.

Besides the IAU list of units and constants, also the International Earth Rotation and Reference Systems Service defines constants relevant to the orientation and rotation of the Earth, in its technical notes.

The IAU system of constants defines a system of astronomical units for length, mass and time (in fact, several such systems), and also includes constants such as the speed of light and the constant of gravitation which allow transformations between astronomical units and SI units. Slightly different values for the constants are obtained depending on the frame of reference used. Values quoted in barycentric dynamical time (TDB) or equivalent time scales such as the T_{eph} of the Jet Propulsion Laboratory ephemerides represent the mean values that would be measured by an observer on the Earth's surface (strictly, on the surface of the geoid) over a long period of time. The IAU also recommends values in SI units, which are the values which would be measured (in proper length and proper time) by an observer at the barycentre of the Solar System: these are obtained by the following transformations:

$$\tau_A({\rm SI}) = (1+L_{\rm B})^{\frac{1}{3}} \tau_A({\rm TDB})\,$$
$$GE({\rm SI}) = (1+L_{\rm B}) GE({\rm TDB})\,$$
$$GS({\rm SI}) = (1+L_{\rm B}) GS({\rm TDB})\,$$

== Astronomical system of units ==
The astronomical unit of time is a time interval of one day (D) of 86400 seconds. The astronomical unit of mass is the mass of the Sun (S). The astronomical unit of length is that length (A) for which the Gaussian gravitational constant (k) takes the value 0.01720209895 when the units of measurement are the astronomical units of length, mass and time.

== Table of astronomical constants ==
Quantity	Symbol	Value	Relative uncertainty	Ref.
Defining constants
Gaussian gravitational constant	k	0.01720209895 A^{3/2}S ^{−1/2}D^{−1}	defined	
Speed of light	c	299792458 m/s	defined	
Mean ratio of the TCG second to the TT second	1 − L_{G}	1 − 6.969290134×10^{−10}	defined	
Mean ratio of the TCB second to the TDB second	1 − L_{B}	1 − 1.55051976772×10^{−8}	defined	
Primary constants
Mean ratio of the TCB second to the TCG second	1 − L_{C}	1 − 1.48082686741×10^{8}	1.4×10^{−9}	
Light-time for Astronomical unit	τ_{A}	499.004783836156 s	A/c	
Equatorial radius for Earth	a_{e}	6.3781366×10^{6} m	1.6×10^{−8}	
Potential of the geoid	W_{0}	6.26368560×10^{7} m^{2}/s^{2}	8.0×10^{−9}	
Dynamical form-factor for Earth	J_{2}	0.0010826359	9.2×10^{−8}	
Flattening factor for Earth	1/ƒ	0.0033528197 = 1/298.25642	3.4×10^{−8}	
Geocentric gravitational constant	GE	3.986004391×10^{14} m^{3}s^{2}	2.0×10^{−9}	
Constant of gravitation	G	6.67430×10^{−11} m^{3}·kg^{−1}·s^{−2}	1.5×10^{−4}	
Ratio of mass of Moon to mass of Earth	μ	0.0123000383 = 1/81.30056	4.0×10^{−8}	
General precession in longitude, per Julian century, at standard epoch 2000	ρ	5028.796195″	*	
Obliquity of the ecliptic, at standard epoch 2000	ε	23° 26′ 21.406″	*	
Derived constants
Constant of nutation, at standard epoch 2000	N	9.2052331″	*	
Astronomical unit	A	149597870700 m	defined	
Solar parallax = arcsin(a_{e}/A)	π_{☉}	8.7941433″	1.6×10^{−8}	†
Constant of aberration, at standard epoch 2000	κ	20.49552″		
Heliocentric gravitational constant = A^{3}k^{2}/D^{2}	GS	1.3272440×10^{20} m^{3}/s^{2}	3.8×10^{−10}	
Ratio of mass of Sun to mass of Earth = (GS)/(GE)	S/E	332946.050895		
Ratio of mass of Sun to mass of (Earth + Moon)	(S/E) (1̅ + μ̅)	328900.561400		
Mass of Sun = (GS)/G	S	1.98855×10^{30} kg	1.0×10^{−4}	†
System of planetary masses: Ratios of mass of Sun to mass of planet
Mercury		6023600		
Venus		408523.71		
Earth + Moon		328900.561400		
Mars		3098708		
Jupiter		1047.3486		
Saturn		3497.898		
Uranus		22902.98		
Neptune		19412.24		
Pluto		135200000		
Other constants (outside the formal IAU System)
Parsec = A/tan(1")	pc	3.08567758128×10^{16} m	4.0×10^{−11}	†
Light-year = 365.25cD	ly	9.4607304725808×10^{15} m	defined	†
Hubble constant	H_{0}	70.1 km/s·Mpc	0.019	
Solar luminosity	L_{☉}	3.939×10^{26} W = 2.107×10^{−15} S/D	variable, ±0.1%	

Notes

* The theories of precession and nutation have advanced since 1976, and these also affect the definition of the ecliptic. The values here are appropriate for the older theories, but additional constants are required for current models.

† The definitions of these derived constants have been taken from the references cited, but the values have been recalculated to take account of the more precise values of the primary constants cited in the table.
