= Gravitational constant =

Physical constant for the strength of gravity induced by a mass

Value of G
6.67430(15)×10^{−11} m^{3}⋅kg^{−1}⋅s^{−2} or N⋅m^{2}⋅kg^{−2}
6.67430(15)×10^{−8} dyn⋅cm^{2}⋅g^{−2} or cm^{3}⋅g^{−1}⋅s^{−2}
4.3009172706(3)×10^{−3} pc⋅M_{⊙}^{−1}⋅(km/s)^{2}
1.3271244002(1)×10^{11} km^{3}⋅M_{⊙}^{−1}⋅s^{−2}

The gravitational constant G is a key quantity in Newton's law of universal gravitation.

The gravitational constant is an empirical physical constant that gives the strength of the gravitational field induced by a mass. It is involved in the calculation of gravitational effects in Isaac Newton's law of universal gravitation and in Albert Einstein's theory of general relativity. It is also known as the universal gravitational constant, the Newtonian constant of gravitation, or the Cavendish gravitational constant, (Note: "Newtonian constant of gravitation" is the name introduced for G by Boys (1894). Use of the term by T.E. Stern (1928) was misquoted as "Newton's constant of gravitation" in Pure Science Reviewed for Profound and Unsophisticated Students (1930), in what is apparently the first use of that term. Use of "Newton's constant" (without specifying "gravitation" or "gravity") is more recent, as "Newton's constant" was also used for the heat transfer coefficient in Newton's law of cooling, but has by now become quite common, e.g. Calmet et al, Quantum Black Holes (2013), p. 93; P. de Aquino, Beyond Standard Model Phenomenology at the LHC (2013), p. 3. The name "Cavendish gravitational constant", sometimes "Newton–Cavendish gravitational constant", appears to have been common in the 1970s to 1980s, especially in (translations from) Soviet-era Russian literature, e.g. Sagitov (1970 [1969]), Soviet Physics: Uspekhi 30 (1987), Issues 1–6, p. 342 [etc.]. "Cavendish constant" and "Cavendish gravitational constant" are also used in Charles W. Misner, Kip S. Thorne, John Archibald Wheeler, Gravitation, (1973), 1126f. Colloquial use of "Big G", as opposed to "little g" for gravitational acceleration dates to the 1960s (R.W. Fairbridge, The encyclopedia of atmospheric sciences and astrogeology, 1967, p. 436; note use of "Big G's" vs. "little g's" as early as the 1940s of the Einstein tensor G_{μν} vs. the metric tensor g_{μν}, Scientific, medical, and technical books published in the United States of America: a selected list of titles in print with annotations: supplement of books published 1945–1948, Committee on American Scientific and Technical Bibliography National Research Council, 1950, p. 26).) denoted by the capital letter G. It is contrastable with (and mathematically relatable to) the Einstein gravitational constant, denoted by lowercase kappa (κ).

In Newton's law, it is the proportionality constant connecting the gravitational force between two bodies with the product of their masses and the inverse square of their distance. In the Einstein field equations, it quantifies the relation between the geometry of spacetime and the stress–energy tensor.

The measured value of the constant is known with some certainty to four significant digits. In SI units, its value is approximately 6.6743×10^{−11} m^{3}⋅kg^{−1}⋅s^{−2}.

The modern notation of Newton's law involving G was introduced in the 1890s by C. V. Boys. The first implicit measurement with an accuracy within about 1% is attributed to Henry Cavendish in a 1798 experiment. (Note: Cavendish determined the value of G indirectly, by reporting a value for the Earth's mass, or the average density of Earth, as 5.448 g⋅cm^{−3}.)

== Definition ==
According to Newton's law of universal gravitation, the magnitude of the attractive force (F) between two points masses is directly proportional to the product of their masses, m_{1} and m_{2}, and inversely proportional to the square of the distance r between them:
$$F=G\frac{m_1m_2}{r^2}.$$
The constant of proportionality, G, in this non-relativistic formulation is the gravitational constant. Colloquially, the gravitational constant is also called "Big G", distinct from "small g" (g), which is the local gravitational field of Earth (also referred to as free-fall acceleration). Where $M_\oplus$ is the mass of Earth and $r_\oplus$ is the radius of Earth, the two quantities are related by:
$$g = G\frac{M_\oplus}{r_\oplus^2}.$$

The gravitational constant is a constant term in the Einstein field equations of general relativity,
$$G_{\mu \nu} + \Lambda g_{\mu \nu} = \kappa T_{\mu \nu} \,,$$
where G_{μν} is the Einstein tensor (not the gravitational constant despite the use of G), Λ is the cosmological constant, g_{μν} is the metric tensor, T_{μν} is the stress–energy tensor, and κ is the Einstein gravitational constant, a constant originally introduced by Einstein that is directly related to the Newtonian constant of gravitation: (Note: Depending on the choice of definition of the Einstein tensor and of the stress–energy tensor it can alternatively be defined as κ = 8πG/c^{2} ≈ 1.866×10^{−26} m⋅kg^{−1})
$$\kappa = \frac{8\pi G}{c^4} \approx 2.076\,647(46) \times 10^{-43} \mathrm{~N^{-1}}.$$

== Meaning ==
The units of G, m^{3} kg^{−1} s^{−2} (in SI), can be arranged for meaning in more than one way, to indicate the meaning of G as the strength of gravity in the universe. One arrangement is N/(kg^{2}/m^{2}) to indicate the force between two masses at a distance according to the inverse-square law. Another, cancelling a common mass unit, is (m/s^{2})/(kg/m^{2}) to indicate the acceleration due to gravity due to a mass at a distance, or the acceleration resulting at a point in space due to the amount of influence there from a distant mass.

== Value and uncertainty ==
The gravitational constant is a physical constant that is difficult to measure with high accuracy. This is because the gravitational force is an extremely weak force as compared to other fundamental forces at the laboratory scale. (Note: For example, the gravitational force between an electron and a proton 1 m apart is approximately 10^{−67} N, whereas the electromagnetic force between the same two particles is approximately 10^{−28} N. The electromagnetic force in this example is in the order of 10^{39} times greater than the force of gravity—roughly the same ratio as the mass of the Sun to a microgram.)

In SI units, the CODATA-recommended value of the gravitational constant is:

$G$ = 6.67430(15)×10^{−11} m^{3}⋅kg^{−1}⋅s^{−2}

The relative standard uncertainty is 2.2×10^{−5}.

=== Natural units ===
Due to its use as a defining constant in some systems of natural units, particularly geometrized unit systems such as Planck units and Stoney units, the value of the gravitational constant will generally have a numeric value of 1 or a value close to it when expressed in terms of those units. Due to the significant uncertainty in the measured value of G in terms of other known fundamental constants, a similar level of uncertainty will show up in the value of many quantities when expressed in such a unit system.

=== Orbital mechanics ===
In astrophysics, it is convenient to measure distances in parsecs (pc), velocities in kilometres per second (km/s) and masses in solar units M_{⊙}. In these units, the gravitational constant is:
$$G \approx 4.3009 \times 10^{-3} {\mathrm{~pc{\cdot}(km/s)^2} \, {M_\odot}^{-1}} .$$
For situations where tides are important, the relevant length scales are solar radii rather than parsecs. In these units, the gravitational constant is:
$$G \approx 1.908\ 09 \times 10^{5} \mathrm{~(km/s)^2 } \, R_\odot {M_\odot}^{-1} .$$
In orbital mechanics, the period P of an object in circular orbit around a spherical object obeys
$$GM=\frac{3\pi V}{P^2} ,$$
where V is the volume inside the radius of the orbit, and M is the total mass of the two objects. It follows that

$$P^2=\frac{3\pi}{G}\frac{V}{M}\approx 10.896 \mathrm{~ h^2 {\cdot} g {\cdot} cm^{-3} \,}\frac{V}{M}.$$

This way of expressing G shows the relationship between the average density of a planet and the period of a satellite orbiting just above its surface.

For elliptical orbits, applying Kepler's third law, expressed in units characteristic of Earth's orbit:

$$G = 4 \pi^2 \mathrm{\ au^3 {\cdot} yr^{-2}} \ M^{-1} \approx 39.478 \mathrm{\ au^3 {\cdot} yr^{-2}} \ {M_\odot}^{-1} ,$$

where distance is measured in terms of the semi-major axis of Earth's orbit (the astronomical unit, au), time in years, and mass in the total mass of the orbiting system (M = M_{☉} + M_{🜨} + M_{☾} (Note: M ≈ 1.000003040433 M_{☉}, so that M = M_{☉} can be used for accuracies of five or fewer significant digits.)).

The above equation is exact only within the approximation of the Earth's orbit around the Sun as a two-body problem in Newtonian mechanics, the measured quantities contain corrections from the perturbations from other bodies in the Solar System and from general relativity.

From 1964 until 2012, however, it was used as the definition of the astronomical unit and thus held by definition:
$$\mathrm{1~au} = \left( \frac{GM}{4 \pi^2} \mathrm{yr}^2 \right)^{\frac{1}{3}} \approx \mathrm{1.495\ 979 \times 10^{11}~m}.$$
Since 2012, the au is defined as 1.495978707×10^{11} m exactly, and the equation can no longer be taken as holding precisely.

The quantity GM—the product of the gravitational constant and the mass of a given astronomical body such as the Sun or Earth—is known as the standard gravitational parameter (also denoted μ). The standard gravitational parameter GM appears as above in Newton's law of universal gravitation, as well as in formulas for the deflection of light caused by gravitational lensing, in Kepler's laws of planetary motion, and in the formula for escape velocity.

This quantity gives a convenient simplification of various gravity-related formulas. The product GM is known much more accurately than either factor is.

Values for GM
Body	μ = GM	Value	Relative uncertainty
Sun	GM_{☉}	1.32712440018(8)×10^{20} m^{3}⋅s^{−2}	6×10^{−11}
Earth	GM_{🜨}	3.986004418(8)×10^{14} m^{3}⋅s^{−2}	2×10^{−9}

Calculations in celestial mechanics can also be carried out using the units of solar masses, mean solar days and astronomical units rather than standard SI units. For this purpose, the Gaussian gravitational constant was historically in widespread use, k = 0.01720209895 radians per day, expressing the mean angular velocity of the Sun–Earth system. The use of this constant, and the implied definition of the astronomical unit discussed above, has been deprecated by the IAU since 2012.

== History of measurement ==
=== Early history ===
The existence of the constant is implied in Newton's law of universal gravitation as published in the 1680s (although its notation as G dates to the 1890s), but is not calculated in his Philosophiæ Naturalis Principia Mathematica where it postulates the inverse-square law of gravitation. In the Principia, Newton considered the possibility of measuring gravity's strength by measuring the deflection of a pendulum in the vicinity of a large hill, but thought that the effect would be too small to be measurable. Nevertheless, he had the opportunity to estimate the order of magnitude of the constant when he surmised that "the mean density of the earth might be five or six times as great as the density of water", which is equivalent to a gravitational constant of the order:

G ≈ (6.7±0.6)×10^{−11} m^{3}⋅kg^{−1}⋅s^{−2}

A measurement was attempted in 1738 by Pierre Bouguer and Charles Marie de La Condamine in their "Peruvian expedition". Bouguer downplayed the significance of their results in 1740, suggesting that the experiment had at least proved that the Earth could not be a hollow shell, as some thinkers of the day, including Edmond Halley, had suggested.

The Schiehallion experiment, proposed in 1772 and completed in 1776, was the first successful measurement of the mean density of the Earth, and thus indirectly of the gravitational constant. The result reported by Charles Hutton (1778) suggested a density of 4.5 g/cm^{3} (4.5 times the density of water), about 20% below the modern value. This immediately led to estimates on the densities and masses of the Sun, Moon and planets, sent by Hutton to Jérôme Lalande for inclusion in his planetary tables. As discussed above, establishing the average density of Earth is equivalent to measuring the gravitational constant, given Earth's mean radius and the mean gravitational acceleration at Earth's surface, by setting
$$G = g\frac{R_\oplus^2}{M_\oplus} = \frac{3g}{4\pi R_\oplus\rho_\oplus}.$$
Based on this, Hutton's 1778 result is equivalent to G ≈ 8×10^{−11} m^{3}⋅kg^{−1}⋅s^{−2}.

Diagram of torsion balance used in the Cavendish experiment performed by Henry Cavendish in 1798, to measure G, with the help of a pulley, large balls hung from a frame were rotated into position next to the small balls.

The first direct measurement of gravitational attraction between two bodies in the laboratory was performed in 1798, seventy-one years after Newton's death, by Henry Cavendish. He determined a value for G implicitly, using a torsion balance invented by the geologist Rev. John Michell (1753). He used a horizontal torsion beam with lead balls whose inertia (in relation to the torsion constant) he could tell by timing the beam's oscillation. Their faint attraction to other balls placed alongside the beam was detectable by the deflection it caused. In spite of the experimental design being due to Michell, the experiment is now known as the Cavendish experiment for its first successful execution by Cavendish.

Cavendish's stated aim was the "weighing of Earth", that is, determining the average density of Earth and the Earth's mass. His result, ρ_{🜨} = 5.448(33) g⋅cm^{−3}, corresponds to value of G = 6.74(4)×10^{−11} m^{3}⋅kg^{−1}⋅s^{−2}. It is remarkably accurate, being about 1% above the modern CODATA recommended value 6.674×10^{−11} m^{3}⋅kg^{−1}⋅s^{−2}, consistent with the claimed relative standard uncertainty of 0.6%.

=== 19th century ===
The accuracy of the measured value of G has increased only modestly since the original Cavendish experiment. G is quite difficult to measure because gravity is much weaker than other fundamental forces, and an experimental apparatus cannot be separated from the gravitational influence of other bodies.

Measurements with pendulums were made by Francesco Carlini (1821, 4.39 g/cm^{3}), Edward Sabine (1827, 4.77 g/cm^{3}), Carlo Ignazio Giulio (1841, 4.95 g/cm^{3}) and George Biddell Airy (1854, 6.6 g/cm^{3}).

Cavendish's experiment was first repeated by Ferdinand Reich (1838, 1842, 1853), who found a value of 5.5832(149) g⋅cm^{−3}, less accurate than Cavendish's result, differing from the modern value by 1.5%. Cornu and Baille (1873), found 5.56 g⋅cm^{−3}.

Cavendish's experiment proved to result in more reliable measurements than pendulum experiments of the "Schiehallion" (deflection) type or "Peruvian" (period as a function of altitude) type. Pendulum experiments still continued to be performed, by Robert von Sterneck (1883, results between 5.0 and 6.3 g/cm^{3}) and Thomas Corwin Mendenhall (1880, 5.77 g/cm^{3}).

Cavendish's result was first improved upon by John Henry Poynting (1891), who published a value of 5.49(3) g⋅cm^{−3}, differing from the modern value by 0.2%, but compatible with the modern value within the cited relative standard uncertainty of 0.55%. In addition to Poynting, measurements were made by C. V. Boys (1895) and Carl Braun (1897), with compatible results suggesting G = 6.66(1)×10^{−11} m^{3}⋅kg^{−1}⋅s^{−2}. The modern notation involving the constant G was introduced by Boys in 1894 and becomes standard by the end of the 1890s, with values usually cited in the cgs system. Richarz and Krigar-Menzel (1898) attempted a repetition of the Cavendish experiment using 100,000 kg of lead for the attracting mass. The precision of their result of 6.683(11)×10^{−11} m^{3}⋅kg^{−1}⋅s^{−2} was, however, of the same order of magnitude as the other results at the time.

Arthur Stanley Mackenzie in The Laws of Gravitation (1899) reviews the work done in the 19th century. Poynting is the author of the article "Gravitation" in the Encyclopædia Britannica Eleventh Edition (1911). Here, he cites a value of G = 6.66×10^{−11} m^{3}⋅kg^{−1}⋅s^{−2} with a relative uncertainty of 0.2%.

=== Modern value ===
Paul R. Heyl (1930) published the value of 6.670(5)×10^{−11} m^{3}⋅kg^{−1}⋅s^{−2} (relative uncertainty 0.1%), improved to 6.673(3)×10^{−11} m^{3}⋅kg^{−1}⋅s^{−2} (relative uncertainty 0.045% = 450 ppm) in 1942.

However, Heyl used the statistical spread as his standard deviation, and he admitted himself that measurements using the same material yielded very similar results while measurements using different materials yielded vastly different results. He spent the next 12 years after his 1930 paper to do more precise measurements, hoping that the composition-dependent effect would go away, but it did not, as he noted in his final paper from the year 1942.

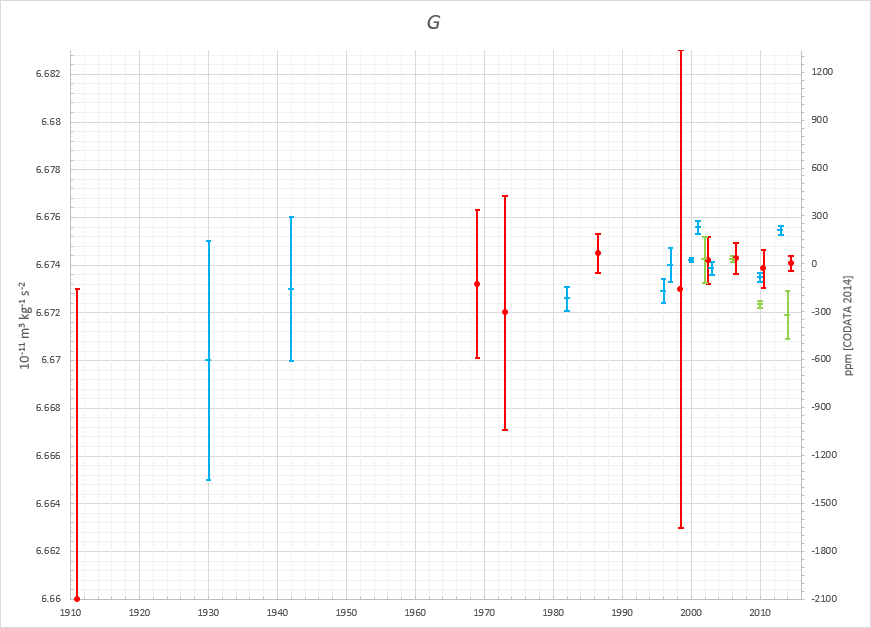
Timeline of measurements and recommended values for G since 1900: values recommended based on a literature review are shown in red, individual torsion balance experiments in blue, other types of experiments in green.

Published values of G derived from high-precision measurements since the 1950s have remained compatible with Heyl (1930), but within the relative uncertainty of about 0.1% (or 1000 ppm) have varied rather broadly, and it is not entirely clear whether the uncertainty has been reduced at all since the 1942 measurement. Some measurements published in the 1980s to 2000s were, in fact, mutually exclusive. Establishing a standard value for G with a relative standard uncertainty better than 0.1% has therefore remained rather speculative.

By 1969, the value recommended by the National Institute of Standards and Technology (NIST) was cited with a relative standard uncertainty of 0.046% (460 ppm), lowered to 0.012% (120 ppm) by 1986. But the continued publication of conflicting measurements led NIST to considerably increase the standard uncertainty in the 1998 recommended value, by a factor of 12, to a standard uncertainty of 0.15%, larger than the one given by Heyl (1930).

The uncertainty was again lowered in 2002 and 2006, but once again raised, by a more conservative 20%, in 2010, matching the relative standard uncertainty of 120 ppm published in 1986. For the 2014 update, CODATA reduced the uncertainty to 46 ppm, less than half the 2010 value, and one order of magnitude below the 1969 recommendation.

The following table shows the NIST recommended values published since 1969:

Recommended values for G
Year	G [10^{−11} m^{3}⋅kg^{−1}⋅s^{−2}]	Change	Relative standard uncertainty	Ref.
1969	6.6732(31)		460 ppm	
1973	6.6720(49)	−180 ppm	730 ppm	
1986	6.67449(81)	+373 ppm	120 ppm	
1998	6.673(10)	−223 ppm	1500 ppm	
2002	6.6742(10)	+180 ppm	150 ppm	
2006	6.67428(67)	+12 ppm	100 ppm	
2010	6.67384(80)	−66 ppm	120 ppm	
2014	6.67408(31)	+36 ppm	46 ppm	
2018	6.67430(15)	+33 ppm	22 ppm	
2022	6.67430(15)	0 ppm	22 ppm	

In the January 2007 issue of Science, Fixler et al. described a measurement of the gravitational constant by a new technique, atom interferometry, reporting a value of G = 6.693(34)×10^{−11} m^{3}⋅kg^{−1}⋅s^{−2}, 0.28% (2800 ppm) higher than the 2006 CODATA value. An improved cold atom measurement by Rosi et al. was published in 2014 of G = 6.67191(99)×10^{−11} m^{3}⋅kg^{−1}⋅s^{−2}. Although much closer to the accepted value (suggesting that the Fixler et al. measurement was erroneous), this result was 325 ppm below the recommended 2014 CODATA value, with non-overlapping standard uncertainty intervals.

In August 2018, a Chinese research group announced new measurements based on torsion balances, 6.674184(78)×10^{−11} m^{3}⋅kg^{−1}⋅s^{−2} and 6.674484(78)×10^{−11} m^{3}⋅kg^{−1}⋅s^{−2} based on two different methods. These are claimed as the most accurate measurements ever made, with standard uncertainties cited as low as 12 ppm. The difference of 2.7 σ between the two results suggests there could be sources of error unaccounted for.

NIST coordinated a campaign to re-evaluate the conflicting measurements, particularly a repetition of the very discrepant results reported by Quinn et al. (2013) using the same apparatus. While originally hoping to report results by 2018, the measurement campaign finally ended in 2024, with a result of 6.67366(20)×10^{−11} m^{3}⋅kg^{−1}⋅s^{−2} reported in 2026.

== Constancy ==
Analysis of observations of 580 type Ia supernovae shows that the gravitational constant has varied by less than one part in ten billion per year over the last nine billion years.

== See also ==
- Gravity of Earth
- Standard gravity
- Gaussian gravitational constant
- Orbital mechanics
- Escape velocity
- Gravitational potential
- Gravitational wave
- Strong gravity
- Dirac large numbers hypothesis
- Accelerating expansion of the universe
- Lunar Laser Ranging experiment
- Cosmological constant
