= Swans discography =

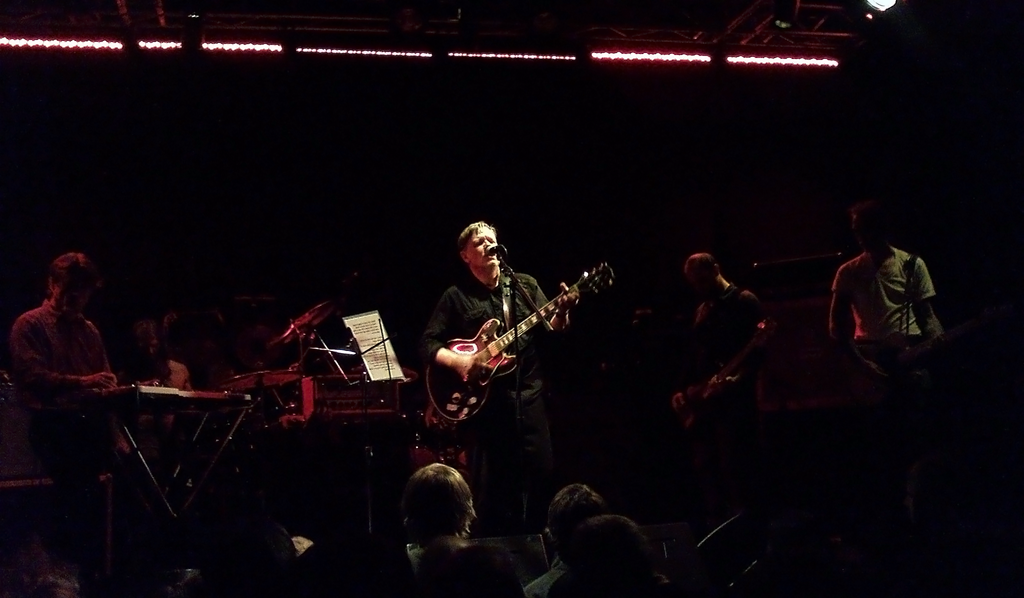
- Studio albums: 17
- Extended plays: 8
- Live albums: 11
- Compilation albums: 14
- Singles: 20
- Music videos: 5
- Fundraiser albums: 6

American experimental rock band Swans has released seventeen studio albums, eleven live albums, fourteen compilation albums, eleven EPs and fifteen singles, and six fundraiser albums containing live, rehearsal tracks and/or demo recordings sold in limited collectible editions to raise money for full-length studio recordings.

== Studio albums ==
Year	Album title	Release details	Peak chart positions							
Year	Album title	Release details	US	UK	BEL FL	BEL WA	NLD	GER	AUT	SWI
1983	Filth	Released: May 27, 1983; Label: Neutral; Format: LP	—	—	—	—	—	—	—	—
1984	Cop	Released: 1984; Label: K.422; Format: LP	—	—	—	—	—	—	—	—
1986	Greed	Released: February 28, 1986; Label: K.422; Format: LP, CD, CS	—	—	—	—	—	—	—	—
1986	Holy Money	Released: March 27, 1986; Label: K.422; Format: LP, CD, CS	—	—	—	—	—	—	—	—
1987	Children of God	Released: October 19, 1987; Label: Caroline; Format: 2LP, CD, CS	—	—	—	—	—	—	—	—
1989	The Burning World	Released: May 1989; Label: Uni; Format: LP, CD, CS	—	—	—	—	—	—	—	—
1991	White Light from the Mouth of Infinity	Released: June 6, 1991; Label: Young God; Format: 2LP, CD, CS	—	—	195	—	—	—	—	—
1992	Love of Life	Released: February 24, 1992; Label: Young God; Format: LP, CD, CS	—	—	—	—	74	—	—	—
1995	The Great Annihilator	Released: January 23, 1995; Label: Young God; Format: 2LP, CD, CS	—	—	149	—	—	—	—	—
1996	Soundtracks for the Blind	Released: October 22, 1996; Label: Young God; Format: 4LP, 2CD, 2CS	—	—	—	—	—	—	—	—
2010	My Father Will Guide Me up a Rope to the Sky	Released: September 23, 2010; Label: Young God; Format: LP, CD, DL	—	—	—	—	—	—	—	—
2012	The Seer	Released: August 28, 2012; Label: Young God; Format: 3LP, 2CD, DL	114	167	113	—	—	—	—	—
2014	To Be Kind	Released: May 12, 2014; Label: Young God; Format: 3LP, 2CD, DL	37	38	39	106	75	56	51	—
2016	The Glowing Man	Released: June 17, 2016; Label: Young God; Format: 3LP, 2CD, DL	151	61	39	69	49	29	24	54
2019	Leaving Meaning	Released: October 25, 2019; Label: Young God; Format: 2LP, 2CD, DL	—	—	93	156	—	58	73	77
2023	The Beggar	Released: June 23, 2023; Label: Young God; Format: 2LP, 2CD, DL	—	—	98	—	—	37	—	—
2025	Birthing	Released: May 30, 2025; Label: Young God; Format: 3LP, 2CD, DL	—	—	140	—	—	25	—	—
"—" denotes a recording that did not chart or was not released in that territory.

== Live albums ==
Year	Album title	Release details
1986	Public Castration Is a Good Idea	Released: 1986; Label: Some Bizzare; Format: 2LP
1986	Real Love	Released: 1986; Label: none; Format: LP
1988	Feel Good Now	Released: 1988; Label: none; Format: 2LP, CD
1990	Anonymous Bodies in an Empty Room	Released: 1990; Label: none; Format: LP, CD
1992	Omniscience	Released: 1992; Label: Young God; Format: CD, CS
1995	Kill the Child	Released: 1995; Label: Disaster; Format: CD
1998	Swans Are Dead	Released: January 20, 1998; Label: Young God; Format: 2CD
2012	We Rose from Your Bed with the Sun in Our Head (re-release)	Released: May 10, 2012; Label: Young God; Format: 2CD
2017	Deliquescence	Released: May 17, 2017; Label: Young God; Format: 2CD, DL
2024	Live Rope	Released: November 15, 2024; Label: Young God; Format: 2CD, 4LP, DL
2026	Newly Sentient Being	Released: October 2, 2026; Label: Young God; Format: 2CD, 4LP, DVD, DL

== Fundraiser albums ==
Year	Album title	Release details
2010	I Am Not Insane (demo tracks)	Released: Jan 20, 2010; Label: Young God; Format: CD
2012	We Rose from Your Bed with the Sun in Our Head (live and demo tracks)	Released: Feb 2, 2012; Label: Young God; Format: 2CD
2013	Not Here / Not Now (live and demo tracks)	Released: September 14, 2013; Label: Young God; Format: 2CD
2015	The Gate (live and demo tracks)	Released: October 1, 2015; Label: Young God; Format: 2CD
2019	What Is This? (demo tracks)	Released: March 18, 2019; Label: Young God; Format: CD
2022	Is There Really a Mind? (demo tracks)	Released: February 2022; Label: Young God; Format: CD

== Compilation albums ==
Year	Album title	Release details
1986	Time Is Money (Bastard) / A Screw	Released: 1986; Label: PVC; Format: CS
1990	Filth (L.P.#1, E.P.#1) 1982/83	Released: 1990; Label: Young God; Format: CD, CS
1991	Body to Body, Job to Job	Released: 1991; Label: Young God; Format: LP, CD, CS
1992	Cop / Young God	Released: 1992; Label: K.422; Format: CD
1992	Greed / Holy Money	Released: 1992; Label: K.422; Format: CD
1997	Children of God / World of Skin	Released: 1997; Label: Young God; Format: 2CD
1999	Cop / Young God / Greed / Holy Money	Released: 1999; Label: Thirsty Ear; Format: 2CD
1999	Various Failures	Released: March 22, 1999; Label: Young God; Format: 2CD
2000	Filth / Body to Body, Job to Job	Released: 2000; Label: Young God; Format: 2CD
2003	Forever Burned	Released: 2003; Label: Young God; Format: CD
2015	Filth (Deluxe)	Released: May 5, 2015; Label: Young God; Format: 3CD
2015	White Light from the Mouth of Infinity / Love of Life • Deluxe Edition	Released: December 4, 2015; Label: Young God; Format: 2LP+CD, 3CD
2017	The Great Annihilator / Drainland	Released: April 28, 2017; Label: Young God; Format: 2CD
2018	Soundtracks for the Blind / Die Tür ist zu	Released: July 20, 2018; Label: Young God; Format: 3CD
2020	Children of God / Feel Good Now	Released: November 13, 2020; Label: Young God; Format: 2CD

== Extended plays ==
Year	Album title	Release details
1982	Swans	Released: 1982; Label: Labor; Format: 12"
1984	Young God	Released: 1984; Label: K.422; Format: 12"
1986	Time is Money (Bastard)	Released: January 31, 1986; Label: K.422; Format: 12"
1986	A Screw	Released: May 2, 1986; Label: K.422; Format: 12"
1988	Love Will Tear Us Apart (red and black versions) (Note: There are two versions of this Joy Division cover; one sung by Jarboe ("black") and another by Gira ("red").)	Released: 1988; Label: Product, inc.; Format: 12", 7", CD
1992	Love of Life / Amnesia	Released: 1992; Label: Young God; Format: 12", CD
1996	Die Tür ist zu	Released: 1996; Label: Rough Trade; Format: 2LP, CD
2014	Oxygen	Released: November 24, 2014; Label: Young God; Format: DL

== Music videos ==
- "A Screw" (1985)
- "New Mind" (1987)
- "Love Will Tear Us Apart" (1988)
- "Saved" (1989)
- "Love of Life" (1992)
- "Alcohol The Seed" (1995)
- "Killing For Company" (1995)

== Singles ==
Title	Year	Chart positions			Album
Title	Year	US Alt.	US College Radio	UK	Album
"New Mind"	1987	—	47	—	Children of God
"Can't Find My Way Home"	1989	—	—	—	The Burning World
"Saved"	1989	28	20	96	The Burning World
"Love Will Save You"	1991	—	—	—	White Light from the Mouth of Infinity
"Celebrity Lifestyle"	1995	—	—	—	The Great Annihilator
"Failure/Animus"	1996	—	—	—	White Light from the Mouth of Infinity / Soundtracks for the Blind
"I Am the Sun" (live)	1997	—	—	—	Non-album single
"Jim"	2010	—	—	—	My Father Will Guide Me up a Rope to the Sky
"Mother of the World"	2012	—	—	—	The Seer
"A Little God in My Hands"	2014	—	—	—	To Be Kind
"Screen Shot"	2015	—	—	—	To Be Kind
"When Will I Return?"	2016	—	—	—	The Glowing Man
"Finally, Peace"	2016	—	—	—	The Glowing Man
"Mind / Body / Light / Sound"	2017	—	—	—	The Great Annihilator (Reissue)
"Volcano"	2018	—	—	—	Soundtracks for the Blind (Reissue)
"It's Coming It's Real"	2019	—	—	—	Leaving Meaning
"The Hanging Man"	2019	—	—	—	Leaving Meaning
"Paradise Is Mine"	2023	—	—	—	The Beggar
"Los Angeles: City Of Death"	2023	—	—	—	The Beggar
"I Am a Tower"	2025	—	—	—	Birthing
