= Deliquescence (album) =

Live album by Swans
- Released: May 17, 2017
- Recorded: September 3, 2016; October 18, 2016
- Venues: The Regency Ballroom, San Francisco; Huxley’s Neue Welt, Berlin
- Length: 155:07
- Label: Young God
- Producer: Michael Gira

Swans chronology
The Glowing Man (2016)	Deliquescence (2017)	What Is This? (2019)

Deliquescence is a 2017 limited-edition, and the overall ninth, live album by American experimental rock band Swans. The album, originally limited to 3,000 CD-only copies, contains three tracks that have previously only been played live. The packaging for the CD release includes the details of location of each show, band photos, and alternative artwork.

At 155 minutes long, Deliquescence is the third longest release by the band to date, being beat out by Live Rope (2024) and Newly Sentient Being (2026). The album was made available on streaming services on June 12th, 2026.

== Track listing ==
All tracks are written by Michael Gira, Norman Westberg, Phil Puleo, Kristof Hahn, Christopher Pravdica, and Paul Wallfisch, except where noted.

Disc one
No.	Title	Writer(s)	Length
1.	"The Knot" (previously unreleased)		45:37
2.	"Screen Shot"	Gira	7:51
3.	"Cloud of Forgetting"	Gira, Westberg, Puleo, Hahn, Pravdica, Thor Harris	16:01
4.	"Deliquescing" (previously unreleased)		10:09
Total length:			79:38

Disc two
No.	Title	Writer(s)	Length
1.	"Cloud of Unknowing"	Gira, Westberg, Puleo, Hahn, Pravdica, Harris	29:22
2.	"The Man Who Refused to Be Unhappy" (previously unreleased)		9:44
3.	"The Glowing Man"	Gira, Westberg, Puleo, Hahn, Pravdica, Harris	36:20
Total length:			75:26

== Personnel ==
Swans

- Michael Gira – guitar, vocals
- Norman Westberg – guitar
- Kristof Hahn – lap steel guitar, loops
- Paul Wallfisch – piano, organ, Mellotron sounds
- Christopher Pravdica – bass guitar
- Phil Puleo – drums, hammer dulcimer

Production

- Eric Moffat – recording engineer, San Francisco show (tracks 1.2, 1.3, 1.4, 2.1)
- Keith Yancsurak – recording engineer, San Francisco show (tracks 1.2, 1.3, 1.4, 2.1)
- Douglas Henderson – recording engineer, Berlin show (tracks 1.1, 2.1, 2.2, 2.3), mastering
- Maximillian Goessgen – recording engineer, Berlin show (tracks 1.1, 2.1, 2.2, 2.3)
- Thomas Stern – mixing
- Michael Gira – art design, fire icon drawing
- Phil Puleo – layout
- Enrico Boettcher – booklet photography
