= Live Rope =

Live album by Swans
- Released: November 15, 2024
- Recorded: 18 May 2024 at Music Hall of Williamsburg, New York City, US; 19 November 2023 at Amare, The Hague, Netherlands
- Genres: Experimental rock, noise rock, post-rock, drone
- Length: 182:51 (USB version); 150:44 (vinyl version); 147:52 (CD version); 175:26 (streaming version)
- Label: Young God
- Producer: Michael Gira

Swans chronology
The Beggar (2023)	Live Rope (2024)	Birthing (2025)

Live Rope (stylized in all-caps) is the tenth live album by American experimental rock band Swans. Released in full in 2024 as a USB "credit card" as well as in edited forms on CD and vinyl, the album served as a fundraiser for the seventeenth studio album Birthing and was their first live album since 2017's Deliquescence. The album comprises recordings from the band's tour supporting their previous album The Beggar, which took place from May 2023 to May 2024, and contains transformed material from that album as well as Leaving Meaning and Birthing.

Unlike previous fundraiser albums (with the exception of We Rose from Your Bed with the Sun in Our Head), which were released in limited quantities, the regular CD version of Live Rope was eventually announced to be made available perpetually as a live album in its own right. The vinyl and USB releases were limited to 1,000 and 1,300 copies respectively. The album was made available on streaming platforms on April 22nd, 2026.

== Background ==
Live Rope consists of the entirety of the band's performance at the Music Hall of Williamsburg, New York City, on 18 May 2024 (lightly edited on the CD and vinyl releases), as well as additional performances of previously released tracks ("The Memorious", "Cathedrals of Heaven", and "Leaving Meaning") recorded at Amare, The Hague on 19 November 2023. "Leaving Meaning", played initially as an introductory section for "Birthing", additionally interpolates "Cloud of Unknowing" from the 2016 album The Glowing Man. Prior to the North American leg of the tour, the Amare show had been planned to be released as a live album, but ultimately, only three songs were used.

The album contains live recordings of songs from the band's previous two albums, Leaving Meaning and The Beggar, on the 2023 and 2024 tours, where both albums' material saw their live debuts. The album also featured three new songs, "Rope/The Beggar", "Away", and "Birthing". "Rope/The Beggar", at 86 minutes (expanded from its original length of 10 minutes), is the band's longest song to date by a significant margin, surpassing the 46-minute runtime of "The Knot" from their 2017 live album Deliquescence. "Rope/The Beggar" was also reworked for the following album, with the first half being used as an introduction to "Away" in closer "(Rope) Away" and the second half being reworked as opener "The Healers". As a whole, at 183 minutes in length, the album is additionally to date the band's longest release, also exceeding Deliquescence at 155 minutes.

A film, (Rope) The Beggar, was also created by Italian-American director Marco Porsia chronicling the full Williamsburg show. It was included in initial copies of Birthing.

== Track listing ==
All music is composed by Michael Gira, Kristof Hahn, Larry Mullins, Dana Schechter, Phil Puleo, and Christopher Pravdica, except where noted.

USB "credit card" version
No.	Title	Music	Length
1.	"Williamsburg, Brooklyn, 2024" I. "Rope/The Beggar" II. "The Hanging Man" III. "Away" IV. "Birthing"	Michael Gira Michael Gira	2:23:57 1:26:07 12:52 7:51 37:27
2.	"Den Haag, Netherlands, 2023" I. "The Memorious" II. "Cathedrals of Heaven" III. "Leaving Meaning"	Michael Gira	38:54 14:07 11:16 13:32
Total length:			182:51

CD version (disc one)
No.	Title	Length
1.	"Rope/The Beggar"	1:18:24

CD version (disc two)
No.	Title	Music	Length
1.	"The Hanging Man"	Michael Gira	12:52
2.	"Away"	Michael Gira	7:51
3.	"Birthing"		37:27
4.	"Cathedrals of Heaven"		11:16
Total length:			147:52

Vinyl version (side one)
No.	Title	Length
1.	"Rope/The Beggar"

Vinyl version (side two)
No.	Title	Length
1.	"Rope/The Beggar (cont.)"

Vinyl version (side three)
No.	Title	Music	Length
1.	"Rope/The Beggar (cont.)"	Michael Gira

Vinyl version (side four)
No.	Title	Music	Length
1.	"Rope/The Beggar (cont.)"	Michael Gira

Vinyl version (side five)
No.	Title	Music	Length
1.	"The Hanging Man"	Michael Gira
2.	"Away"	Michael Gira

Vinyl version (side six)
No.	Title	Length
1.	"Birthing"

Vinyl version (side seven)
No.	Title	Length
1.	"Birthing (cont.)"

Vinyl version (side eight)
No.	Title	Music	Length
1.	"The Memorious"	Michael Gira

== Personnel ==
Swans

- Michael Gira – acoustic guitar, vocals, cover art, art direction/design
- Phil Puleo – drums, Appalachian dulcimer, flute, melodica, insert art, layout
- Christoph Hahn – double lap steel guitar, loops
- Dana Schechter – lap steel guitar, bass guitar, loops
- Christopher Pravdica – bass guitar, taishōgoto, loops, sounds
- Larry Mullins – Mellotron, keyboards, synthesiser, drums, sounds

Production

- Jerry Melcher – recording, live mixing engineer
- Ingo Krauss – mixing (Williamsburg), mastering (The Hague)
- Thomas Stern – mixing (The Hague)
- Doug Henderson – mastering (Williamsburg)
