= Newly Sentient Being =

Live album by Swans
- Released: October 2, 2026
- Recorded: November 28, 2025
- Venues: Festsaal Kreuzberg, Berlin
- Length: 149:33 (CD version); 160:02 (digital & streaming version)
- Label: Young God Records
- Producer: Michael Gira

Swans chronology
Birthing (2025)	Newly Sentient Being (2026)

Newly Sentient Being is the eleventh live album by American experimental rock band Swans, released on October 2, 2026, via Young God Records. Young God's press release for the album described it as the final record in the "big sound" era of the band which began with their 2010s reformation. It is a recording of a November 28, 2025 show in Berlin, during the Birthing tour. The album contains three entirely new tracks, one from Birthing with compositional revisions ("The Merge"), and one from The Beggar ("Paradise Is Mine"). Physical releases of the record contain a DVD of the performance directed by Marco Porsia and Peter Harton. At 160 minutes in length, it is the band's second longest official release, coming in behind Live Rope, which runs for over three hours.

== Track listing ==
Digital & Streaming Version
No.	Title	Length
1.	"The End of Forgetting"	39:08
2.	"The Merge"	38:55
3.	"Paradise Is Mine"	13:59
4.	"Newly Sentient Being"	53:24
5.	"The End of Regretting"	14:58
Total length:		160:24

CD Version (disc one)
No.	Title	Length
1.	"The End of Forgetting"	38:46
2.	"The Merge"	35:26
Total length:		74:12

CD Version (disc two)
No.	Title	Length
1.	"Paradise Is Mine"	13:46
2.	"Newly Sentient Being"	46:37
3.	"The End of Regretting"	14:58
Total length:		75:21

== Personnel ==
Credits adapted from the album's liner notes.

Swans

- Michael Gira – guitar, voice, words, production, drawings, art direction
- Norman Westberg – guitar
- Dana Schechter – lap steel guitar, bass guitar, loops
- Phil Puleo – drums, dulcimer, layout
- Larry Mullins – Mellotron, keyboards, synthesizer, drums
- Kristof Hahn – lap steel guitar, loops
- Christopher Pravdica – bass guitar, loops, Taishōgoto

Other contributors

- Laura Carbone – additional vocals on "Paradise Is Mine"
- Lucy Kruger – additional vocals on "Paradise Is Mine"
- Hieronymus Melchers – live sound engineer and concert recording
- Emily Mackrell – additional live sound recording
- Ingo Krauss – mixing
- Doug Henderson – mastering
- Mac Janas – band photos

== Charts ==
Chart performance for Newly Sentient Being
Chart (2023–2026)	Peak position
Belgian Albums (Ultratop Flanders)	177
Croatian International Albums (HDU)	8
French Rock & Metal Albums (SNEP)	94
Scottish Albums (Official Charts)	46
UK Albums Sales (Official Charts)	37
UK Independent Albums (Official Charts)	15
