= The Gate (Swans album) =

2015 album

- Cover art of one of the copies

Live album by Swans
- Released: October 1, 2015
- Recorded: October 22, 2014
- Venues: Berghain, Berlin
- Length: 148:09
- Label: Young God
- Producer: Michael Gira

Swans chronology
Oxygen (2014)	The Gate (2015)	The Glowing Man (2016)

The Gate is a 2015 limited-edition live album by American experimental rock band Swans. The album was released on October 1, 2015 on band leader Michael Gira's Young God Records. Limited to 2500 copies, the album served as a fundraiser for The Glowing Man.

== Background ==
The Gate was offered in a double-CD format. The album features six live recordings, with four of them being previously unreleased tracks set to be included in the next studio album. The other two recordings are the live versions of "A Little God in My Hands" and "Just a Little Boy," both from Swans' 2014 album, To Be Kind. The album additionally includes five "rough, crudely recorded demos," that will be re-recorded for the upcoming album.

The album also includes a DVD documentary on Swans' To Be Kind tour. Similar to the previous fundraising live albums, each CD copy came with a personalized cover art by the band, featuring a cardboard cover drawn by Michael Gira.

Each copy of the album has personalized cover art by the band.

== Critical reception ==
Professional ratings
Review scores
Source	Rating
PopMatters	7/10

In her review of the album for PopMatters, Natasha Gatian wrote, "It lacks some of the momentum and surprise of Swans’ studio work, but then, that’s one of the possible pitfalls of a live album. Diehards will appreciate hearing Swans in the wild, but casual fans might be better off sticking with album cuts before crossing The Gate’s imposing threshold."

== Track listing ==
All tracks are written by Michael Gira, Norman Westberg, Christopher Pravdica, Kristof Hahn, Michael Harris & Philip Puleo, except where noted.

Disc one
No.	Title	Writer(s)	Length
1.	"Frankie M."		29:25
2.	"A Little God in My Hands"	Michael Gira	13:13
3.	"Apost" / "Cloud of Unforming" (First part from "The Apostate", later recorded as "Cloud of Unknowing")		33:41
Total length:			76:19

Disc two
No.	Title	Writer(s)	Length
1.	"Just a Little Boy"		16:40
2.	"Cloud of Forgetting" (Performed on preceding tour as "I Forget")		11:34
3.	"Bring the Sun / Black-Eyed Man" ("Black-Eyed Man" performed on tour as "Black Hole Man", whole piece later recorded as "The Glowing Man")		28:16
4.	"When Will I Return?"	Gira	2:57
5.	"New Rhythm Thing" (Later to be titled "The World Looks Black")	Gira	2:00
6.	"People Like Us"	Gira	3:54
7.	"Red Rhythm Thing" (Later to be titled "The World Looks Red")	Gira	3:04
8.	"Finally, Peace."		3:26
Total length:			71:51

== Personnel ==
- Michael Gira – guitar, vocals
- Christoph Hahn – double lap steel guitar, guitar
- Thor Harris – drums, percussion, vibes, clarinet, melodica, violin, Gizmos
- Christopher Pravdica – bass guitar, Gizmos
- Phil Puleo – drums, Appalachian dulcimer, Gizmos
- Norman Westberg – guitar
