= The Seer (Swans album) =

Studio album by Swans
- Released: August 28, 2012
- Recorded: 2011
- Studios: Studio P4 (Berlin); Andere Baustelle (Berlin); Marcata Studio (Gardiner, New York); Trout Recording (New York, New York)
- Genres: Post-rock; experimental; noise rock; drone; art rock
- Length: 119:13
- Language: English
- Label: Young God
- Producer: Michael Gira

Swans chronology
We Rose from Your Bed with the Sun in Our Head (2012)	The Seer (2012)	Not Here / Not Now (2013)

The Seer is the twelfth studio album by the American experimental rock band Swans. It was released by Young God Records on August 28, 2012. Producer and front man Michael Gira funded the recording of the album with the sales of the live double album We Rose from Your Bed with the Sun in Our Head (2012).

While the previous studio album My Father Will Guide Me up a Rope to the Sky was seen as a cross between Gira's solo project Angels of Light and late Swans, The Seer strayed away from Angels of Light's more accessible songs and lyricism, focusing more around sonic landscapes. The album features a variety of instrumentation and guest musicians, including the post-punk band Yeah Yeah Yeahs vocalist Karen O and former Swans member Jarboe. The album is noteworthy due to its extended song lengths, particularly its over thirty minute title track, as well as its frequent experimentation with drone and noise elements. The album garnered critical acclaim from mainstream publications and appeared in publications' best of the year album lists. The Seer is considered the first part of a three-album trilogy, alongside the following To Be Kind (2014) and The Glowing Man (2016).

== Background ==
Swans' previous studio album My Father Will Guide Me up a Rope to the Sky was released in 2010 to universal critical acclaim. It was their first album released coming off of a 13-year hiatus.

He described the album as taking "30 years to make" and is "the culmination of every previous Swans album as well as any other music I've ever made". The songs "93 Ave. B Blues", "The Seer", "The Apostate", and "Avatar" were developed during tours and rehearsals, while the rest of the songs were created in the studio. While their previous effort was seen as a continuation of Gira's folk solo project Angels of Light mixed with Swans' original elements, Gira stated that The Seer was more focused as a Swans effort due to touring.

The band started recording in Berlin after a hiatus during touring, as Gira wanted to get it done while they were a live band. After a year of touring, they recorded in New York while Gira spent the next five months doing overdubs and fleshing out songs written on his acoustic guitar. While Gira sings on the majority of the songs, he enlisted Karen O to assist with singing "Song for a Warrior" because Gira believed that "Since the song is like a country lullaby, I thought it would be appropriate for a female. Chris [Pravdica, Swans' bass player] pointed me to a few of Karen's solo works where she sings in this really gentle, compassionate, soulful way." Former Swans member Jarboe also made an appearance on the album once Gira met her after an Atlanta tour as he needed "some female vocals doing these kind of drone chords". The name of the album and title track came from Swans performing the title track multiple times instrumentally until Gira improvised "I see it all, I see it all", which he thought fit the music. The artwork from the album was based on a tempera wolf painting by Simon Henwood and featured Gira's teeth on the wolf.

== Development ==
=== Writing ===
Swans funded The Seer with the live double album We Rose from Your Bed with the Sun in Our Head (2012). They also raised money by recording personalized songs for people who donated $500 into funding The Seer. Whereas on their previous studio album the musicians hadn't worked together before, they had toured together for a year when writing The Seer. Gira wanted "no restrictions" when making the album, as he had full creative control due to him owning his own record label. Gira called the band he played with on the album as "the best band [he's] ever had as a whole".

When writing The Seer, Gira would begin writing the songs on an acoustic guitar, and then with the help of the band, the songs would develop more. The band would then play the songs in the studio and then play them live, and at that point they would either "mutate further, endlessly, or perhaps be discarded for a while". When working on a certain song, Gira would think about other songs on the album and how they would relate to each other. If there was one section that was violent or heavy, he tried to counterbalance that in another section.

== Critical reception ==
Professional ratings
Aggregate scores
Source	Rating
AnyDecentMusic?	8.3/10
Metacritic	87/100
Review scores
Source	Rating
AllMusic	4.5/5 stars
The A.V. Club	A
The Guardian	4/5 stars
The Independent	4/5 stars
Mojo	4/5 stars
The New Zealand Herald	5/5 stars
NME	8/10
Pitchfork	9.0/10
Rolling Stone	3.5/5 stars
Spin	8/10

The Seer was met with widespread critical acclaim. At Metacritic, which assigns a normalized rating out of 100 to reviews from critics, the album received an average score of 87, based on 32 reviews, indicating "universal acclaim". Writing for Rolling Stone, Will Hermes called the album Swans' "grandest statement yet" and described the title track as "a season in hell, and then some". Also describing the title track, Jason Heller of The A.V. Club wrote: "It's the most harrowing, exhausting, cathartic, transcendental piece of music Gira has ever put to tape." Thom Jurek of AllMusic described The Seer as "the most sprawling, ambitious, thoughtfully conceived and tightly performed recording in the band's catalog". The Guardian's Dave Simpson wrote that the album "won't be for everybody, but deserves to win new converts".

Several music criticism websites included The Seer on their lists of the best albums of 2012. Stereogum ranked the album at fourth in their top 50 albums. Pitchfork ranked it at fifth, with writer Stuart Berman writing that The Seer "evinces a magisterial grandeur and hypnotic allure, elevating Swans’ seedy, sewer-scraping depravity into an extravagant, cinematically scaled noise". Sputnikmusic staff member SowingSeason said that The Seer "could be the best album of Michael Gira's thirty year career" and was the best of 2012. The A.V. Club staff ranked the album seventh in their best of 2012 list and stated that "Gira did the seemingly impossible and topped [My Father], however, with the Seer". Commercially, the album peaked at number 114 on the Billboard 200 and at number 22 on the Independent Albums chart.

== Track listing ==
All tracks are written by Michael Gira, unless noted.

Disc one
No.	Title	Writer(s)	Length
1.	"Lunacy" (featuring Alan Sparhawk and Mimi Parker)		6:09
2.	"Mother of the World"		9:57
3.	"The Wolf"	Gira, Christoph Hahn, Thor Harris, Christopher Pravdica, Phil Puleo, Norman Westberg	1:35
4.	"The Seer"		32:14
5.	"The Seer Returns" (featuring Jarboe)	Gira, Hahn, Harris, Pravdica, Puleo, Westberg	6:17
6.	"93 Ave. B Blues"		5:21
7.	"The Daughter Brings the Water"		2:40
Total length:			64:13

Disc two
No.	Title	Writer(s)	Length
1.	"Song for a Warrior" (featuring Karen O)		3:58
2.	"Avatar"	Gira, Hahn, Harris, Pravdica, Puleo, Westberg	8:51
3.	"A Piece of the Sky" (featuring Jarboe and Akron/Family)		19:10
4.	"The Apostate(*)"	Gira, Hahn, Harris, Pravdica, Puleo, Westberg	23:01
Total length:			55:00

The album featured a different track order for its vinyl release.

(*): Also known as "Apostate".

Vinyl version (Side one)
No.	Title	Length
1.	"Lunacy" (featuring Alan Sparhawk and Mimi Parker)	6:07
2.	"The Apostate Pt. 1"	13:18

Vinyl version (Side two)
No.	Title	Length
1.	"The Apostate Pt. 2"	9:36
2.	"A Piece of the Sky Pt. 1" (featuring Jarboe and Akron/Family)	9:36

Vinyl version (Side three)
No.	Title	Length
1.	"A Piece of the Sky Pt. 2" (featuring Jarboe and Akron/Family)	9:30
2.	"93 Ave. B Blues"	5:22
3.	"The Daughter Brings the Water"	2:33
4.	"Song for a Warrior" (featuring Karen O)	3:58

Vinyl version (Side four)
No.	Title	Length
1.	"Mother of the World"	9:57
2.	"Avatar"	8:51

Vinyl version (Side five)
No.	Title	Length
1.	"The Wolf"	1:35
2.	"The Seer Pt. 1"	18:56

Vinyl version (Side six)
No.	Title	Length
1.	"The Seer Pt. 2"	13:17
2.	"The Seer Returns" (featuring Jarboe)	6:15

Bonus live 2010/2011 DVD track listing
No.	Title	Length
1.	"No Words/No Thoughts"	18:50
2.	"Avatar"	10:36
3.	"The Apostate"	19:36
4.	"Beautiful Child (fragment)"	3:43
5.	"Jim"	8:16
6.	"Sex God Sex"	7:13
7.	"The Seer / I Crawled"	32:16

== Personnel ==
Adapted from Gira's Young God Records website.

Swans

- Michael Gira – lead vocals, acoustic guitar, electric guitar, harmonica, Casio, sounds
- Kristof Hahn – lap steel guitar, electric guitars, additional vocals
- Thor Harris – drums, percussion, orchestral bells, hammered dulcimer, vibraphone, piano, clarinet, handmade violin
- Christopher Pravdica – bass guitar, additional vocals, incredible handshake
- Phil Puleo – drums, percussion, hammered dulcimer, additional vocals
- Norman Westberg – electric guitar, additional vocals
- Bill Rieflin – piano, organ, electric guitar, acoustic guitar, drums, percussion, Casio, synthesizer, bass guitar, additional vocals, bird idea; credited as "honorary Swan"

Guests

- Karen O – lead vocals on "Song for a Warrior"
- Alan Sparhawk and Mimi Parker – co-vocals on "Lunacy"
- Jarboe – backing vocals on "The Seer Returns" and "A Piece of the Sky", voice collage on "A Piece of the Sky"
- Seth Olinsky, Miles Seaton, and Dana Janssen – background vocals on "A Piece of the Sky"
- Caleb Mulkerin and Colleen Kinsella – accordion, additional vocals, dulcimer, guitar, piano and other instruments on "The Seer Returns"
- Sean Mackowiak – acoustic and electric mandolin, clarinet
- Ben Frost – fire sounds (acoustic and synthetic) on "A Piece of the Sky"
- Iain Graham – bagpipes on "The Seer"
- Bruce Lamont – horns on "The Seer"
- Bob Rutman – steel cello on "The Seer"
- Cassis Staudt – accordion
- Eszter Balint – violin
- Jane Scarpantoni – cello
- Kevin McMahon – additional drums on "The Seer Returns" and "Avatar", additional guitars on "Song for a Warrior" and "Avatar"
- Bryce Goggin – piano on "Song for a Warrior"
- Bill Tobin – Oboe on “Avatar”
- Stefan Rocke – contrabassoon on "The Seer"

Technical personnel

- Michael Gira – producing
- Kevin McMahon – engineering, mixing
- Macro and Boris – engineering assistants of Kevin McMahon
- Bryce Goggin – engineering
- Adam Sachs – engineering assistant of Bruce Goggin
- Doug Henderson – mastering
- Jamal Ruhe – pre-mastering
- Simon Henwood – artwork

== Charts ==
Chart (2012)	Peak position
Belgian Albums (Ultratop Flanders)	113
UK Albums (Official Charts)	167
US Billboard 200	114
US Independent Albums (Billboard)	22
US Top Alternative Albums (Billboard)	24
US Top Rock Albums (Billboard)	35
