= Flux Information Sciences =

US musical group

Flux Information Sciences were a three-piece noise rock band based in Brooklyn, New York. The band was formed in 1996 by vocalist/guitarist Tristan Bechet (born in Portugal in 1973, raised in Brazil) and keyboardist Sebastian Brault (born in Madagascar and raised in France), who met in art school in Marseille. A revolving drummer policy saw Derek Ethridge replace Phil Hernandez in 1999, who was in turn replaced by Siobhan Duffy. Eventually, the band settled on the line-up of Bechet and Brault, with Christopher Pravdica on electronics.

Flux Information Sciences was influenced by the 1980s New York No Wave scene, by bands such as The Contortions, James White & the Blacks, Suicide and Foetus. In 2004, Flux were featured in S.A. Crary's documentary on No Wave Kill Your Idols. Private/Public was recorded before a live audience who were required to stand naked and blindfolded before the band.

The band's debut album A Dedication to Volt was released in 1997, followed by Services in 1999. Their third album, Summer, was released in 2000, and described by Joe Silva of AllMusic as seeing Flux "retain...[their] ability to playfully challenge listeners to find entry points to their material, while maintaining their levels of chaos and invention". In 2001, Flux signed to Young God Records and released "Private/Public". Young God label boss and Swans vocalist Michael Gira described the band as "life-threatening".

The New York Times described their sound as "a clattering, dissonant, choppy, propulsive racket, punctuated every so often by a vocal chant; it's ominous and mockingly jubilant, somewhere between the Gang of Four and Ministry." In "Kill Your Idols", Bechet provides insight into the band's approach to rhythm when he described living across the road to "a metal stamping factory, and the rhythms and sounds that they make, are truly fucking phenomenal, just fucking...pff...amazing and groovy as shit; those are the kind of rhythms I enjoy, its almost as if New York City is the script and we interpret that.

Since the band's break-up, Bechet has formed the Pinksock Records label and worked with several artists, such as F. M. Einheit of Einstürzende Neubauten and Khan. He has released albums by several experimental projects, including his heavy metal mash-up vinyl "Please Forgive Me" and "Waiting for the Sun" CD by "Sauna KIngs". After the Label faded, Bechet founded "SERVICES" with Christopher Pravdica; a former member of Flux.

== Discography ==
- A Dedication to Volt (1997)
- Services (1999)
- Summer (2000)
- Private/Public (2001)
