= What Is This? (disambiguation) =

What Is This? is a band that was a precursor of the Red Hot Chili Peppers.

"What Is This?" could also refer to:

- A 1985 eponymous album by What Is This?
- What Is This? (Swans album), a 2019 fundraiser album by American rock band Swans
- "What Is This?", a 2017 song by American rapper Snoop Dogg
