= The Gunga Din =

American rock band

- Origin: New York City, New York, U.S.
- Genres: Indie rock; art rock
- Years active: 1998–2000
- Labels: Tractor Beam; Jetset
- Past members: Siobhan Duffy; Bill Bronson; Chris Pravdica; Jim Sclavunos; Maria Zastrow

The Gunga Din was an American rock band formed in 1998 in New York City. The band featured vocalist Siobhan Duffy, guitarist/vocalist Bill Bronson, bassist Chris Pravdica, drummer Jim Sclavunos, and keyboardist Maria Zastrow. They released two albums, Introducing: The Gunga Gin and Glitterati, in 1999 and 2000, respectively. The members came from diverse musical background, having played in the bands such as God Is My Co-Pilot, Swans, and Nick Cave and the Bad Seeds.

Described as a "New York-style art rock band," The Gunga Din combined a Farfisa organ with psychedelic music-inspired drumming. Their debut album was characterized as "an equal blend of post-punk and new wave" with occasional psychobilly influences and drew comparisons to the works of bands like the Doors, X and Suicide. The band's second studio album also drew comparisons to the works of PJ Harvey and The Velvet Underground.

== Band members ==
- Siobhan Duffy – vocals, drums
- Bill Bronson – guitar, vocals
- Chris Pravdica – bass guitar
- Jim Sclavunos – drums
- Maria Zastrow – keyboards

== Discography ==
Studio albums

- Introducing: The Gunga Din (1999)
- Glitterati (2000)

Other releases

- Your Glitter Never Dulls (2000)
