= Not Here / Not Now =

2013 live album

- Cover art of the 619th pressing

Live album (double album) by Swans
- Released: September 14, 2013
- Recorded: February 15, 2013 (track 7); May 24, 2013 (tracks 1–6)
- Venue: Corner Hotel, Melbourne (track 7); Primavera Sound, Barcelona, Spain (tracks 1–6)
- Length: 109:17
- Label: Young God
- Producer: Michael Gira

Swans chronology
The Seer (2012)	Not Here / Not Now (2013)	To Be Kind (2014)

Professional ratings
Review scores
Source	Rating
Pitchfork	8.2/10

Not Here / Not Now is a limited-edition double live album by American post-rock band, Swans. It was announced for sale on October 14, 2013, via Young God Records. The profits earned from this album were used to fund the band's subsequent album, To Be Kind.

== Background ==
The live album, which consists of 2000 copies, was primarily recorded during the band's appearance at Primavera Sound 2013 festival in Barcelona, with closer "Nathalie Neal" taken from their show in Melbourne earlier that year. It features live versions of The Seer, a live version of "Coward" from their 1986 album Holy Money, new unrecorded songs, and two "crude acoustic demos of songs for the upcoming studio album". The cover art, which was drawn by artist Nicole Boitos, was uniquely "further drawn upon, personalized and signed by Michael Gira" for each copy.

Along with the live album, various other options are available with special offerings for different monetary alternatives, including an "executive producer" credit on the band's new album or "video of a simple, short, original song, acoustic guitar and voice, with customers' name in the song, praising the customer, his or her ancestors, thoughts, dreams, and future or past lives, forever", written and sung by Gira. Other offerings include VIP guest list status to the band's one of the upcoming concert shows or a printed poster.

The album shares its name with the title of a song from Angels of Light's 2007 record, We Are Him.

== Critical reception ==
Stuart Berman of Pitchfork praised the album, stating: "Of the songs featured on Not Here/Not Now, only three have appeared on previous recordings. And any worries that Swans are showing too much of their hand are defused by the fact that new Swans songs rarely make it from the stage to record in the same form, and, once officially released, mutate even further in subsequent performances."

== Track listing ==
Disc one

No.	Title	Length
1.	"To Be Kind"	16:53
2.	"Just a Little Boy"	10:03
3.	"Coward"	7:23
4.	"She Loves Us!"	15:13
5.	"Oxygen"	7:20
Total length:		56:52

Disc two

No.	Title	Length
1.	"The Seer" / "Bring the Sun" / "Toussaint L'Ouverture" (Later recorded as "Bring the Sun" / "Toussaint L'Ouverture")	44:31
2.	"Nathalie Neal"	7:54

Bonus tracks

No.	Title	Length
3.	"Kirstin Supine" (demo)	5:18
4.	"Screen Shot" (demo)	4:53
Total length:		62:36

== Personnel ==
- Michael Gira – guitar, vocals
- Christoph Hahn – double lap steel guitar, guitar
- Thor Harris – drums, percussion, vibes, clarinet, melodica, violin, Gizmos
- Christopher Pravdica – bass guitar, Gizmos
- Phil Puleo – drums, Appalachian dulcimer, Gizmos
- Norman Westberg – guitar
