= Birthing (album) =

Studio album by Swans
- Released: May 30, 2025
- Recorded: 2023–2024
- Genres: Post-rock; noise rock
- Length: 115:35
- Labels: Mute; Young God
- Producer: Michael Gira

Swans chronology
Live Rope (2024)	Birthing (2025)	Newly Sentient Being (2026)

Singles from Birthing
- 1. "I Am a Tower" Released: February 25, 2025

Birthing is the seventeenth studio album by the American experimental rock band Swans. It was released on May 30, 2025, through Mute and Young God Records. Frontman Michael Gira stated that the album was the last to focus on "all-consuming sound worlds", with future albums taking on a "significantly pared down form". The first single from Birthing, "I Am a Tower", was released on February 25, 2025.

== Background ==
Michael Gira, the frontman for Swans, stated that the material within Birthing was developed and recorded across a yearlong tour. The songs were then further orchestrated and rearranged in the studio. Gira also stated that it would be the last "big sound" Swans album, with future releases from the band being "significantly pared down". A tour for the album ended on November 28 in Berlin. A live album documenting the tour, Newly Sentient Being, was released on October 2, 2026.

== Release ==
The first single from Birthing, "I Am a Tower" was released on February 25, 2025. Commenting for Beats Per Minute's "BPM Curates: February 2025", John Amen wrote, "the track is a study in opposites and functions as a sonic diptych ... [Gira's] voice and the driving music conjuring a sublime blend of humility and braggadocio, embodiment and transcendence, megalomania and self-erasure". Birthing was released on May 30, 2025, on 2xCD and 3xLP through Mute and Young God Records. Initial pressings of the album came with a concert film of the band, (Rope) The Beggar, as well as a documentary focused on Gira's 2022 solo tour, I Wonder If I'm Singing What You're Thinking Me to Sing.

== Critical reception ==
Professional ratings
Aggregate scores
Source	Rating
AnyDecentMusic?	8.2/10
Metacritic	87/100
Review scores
Source	Rating
AllMusic	4/5 stars
Beats Per Minute	85%
God Is in the TV	8/10
Louder Than War	5/5 stars
MusicOMH	5/5 stars
PopMatters	8/10
Slant Magazine	4.5/5 stars
Sputnikmusic	4.2/5
Uncut	8/10

According to the review aggregator Metacritic, Birthing received "universal acclaim" based on a weighted average score of 87 out of 100 from 8 critic scores.

== Track listing ==
All lyrics are written by Michael Gira; all music is composed by Gira, Larry Mullins, Phil Puleo, Christopher Pravdica, Dana Schechter, Kristof Hahn, except where noted.

Disc one
No.	Title	Length
1.	"The Healers"	21:41
2.	"I Am a Tower"	19:17
3.	"Birthing"	22:20
Total length:		63:18

Disc two
No.	Title	Length
1.	"Red Yellow"	6:51
2.	"Guardian Spirit"	10:57
3.	"The Merge"	15:19
4.	"(Rope) Away": "Rope (14:50)"; "Away (4:20)"	19:10
Total length:		52:17

Physical versions of the album list "(Rope) Away" as two separate tracks: "Rope" and "Away" with the same lengths listed above.

Vinyl version (Side one)
No.	Title	Length
1.	"The Healers"	21:41

Vinyl version (Side two)
No.	Title	Length
1.	"I Am a Tower"	19:17

Vinyl version (Side three)
No.	Title	Length
1.	"Birthing"	22:20

Vinyl version (Side four)
No.	Title	Length
1.	"Red Yellow"	6:51
2.	"Guardian Spirit"	10:57

Vinyl version (Side five)
No.	Title	Length
1.	"The Merge"	15:19

Vinyl version (Side six)
No.	Title	Length
1.	"Rope"	14:50
2.	"Away"	4:20

== Personnel ==
Credits adapted from Birthing liner notes.

Swans

- Michael Gira – vocals, acoustic guitar, producer, art direction, design
- Phil Puleo – drums, hammered dulcimer, flute, melodica, percussion, layout
- Kristof Hahn – lap steel guitar, acoustic guitar, electric guitar, loops, backing vocals
- Dana Schechter – lap steel guitar, bass guitar, loops
- Christopher Pravdica – bass guitar, Taishōgoto, loops, sound effects, keyboards
- Larry Mullins – Mellotron, keyboards, piano, synthesizer, drums, vibraphone, percussion, backing vocals
- Norman Westberg – electric guitar, loops

Guest musicians

- Jennifer Gira – guest, backing vocals
- Laura Carbone – guest, backing vocals
- Lucy Kruger – guest, backing vocals
- Andreas Dormann – guest, soprano saxophone
- Little Mikey – guest, backing vocals
- Timothy Wyskida – drums on "The Merge"

Engineers

- Doug Henderson – mastering
- Ingo Krauss – recording, mixing
- Kiron Gaudi – engineering assistance

== Charts ==
Chart performance for Birthing
Chart (2025)	Peak position
Belgian Albums (Ultratop Flanders)	140
Croatian International Albums (HDU)	10
French Rock & Metal Albums (SNEP)	26
German Albums (Offizielle Top 100)	25
Scottish Albums (Official Charts)	12
UK Albums Sales (OCC)	12
UK Independent Albums (Official Charts)	5
UK Progressive Albums (Official Charts)	10
