= Botanica (band) =

American band

- Origin: Los Angeles, United States
- Genres: Alternative rock
- Years active: 1999–2014
- Labels: Rent a Dog, Al!ve
- Past members: Paul Wallfisch; John Andrews; Brian Viglione; Jason Binnick
- Website: www.botanicaisaband.com

Botanica was a New-York based band, originally founded in Los Angeles in 1999. Led by Paul Wallfisch, a keyboardist and singer associated with Firewater, the band drew its name from the Botánica stores, which trade in folk medicine, amulets, and other products regarded as magical or as alternative medicine. On January 15, 2014, the band announced via its Facebook page and official website that it was "on indefinite leave.".

From 1999 to 2002 Botanica chiefly toured the US, including support dates for 16 Horsepower, Super Furry Animals and Rocket From the Crypt. Since then, Wallfisch lived and worked primarily in Europe. This included a five-year contract (from 2010 to 2015) as musical director of the Theater Dortmund, Germany. Botanica's subsequent albums were all released as a Rent A Dog/Alive label. Consequently, Botanica's tours from 2002 onward also focused on Europe, especially Germany.

Botanica's music has been used in several films including Men Cry Bullets (Phaedra), and The Takedown (Dimension/Miramax). Botanica, (with ex-Jesus Lizard David Sims), is featured in Greg Pritikin's film Dummy (Artisan Entertainment), starring Adrien Brody and Milla Jovovich. Wallfisch also scored the film.

The band released its final album, What do you believe, in 2012, followed by a European tour that finished in July 2013. Afterwards, Wallfisch initially focused his musical efforts on a new project with Alexander Hacke (of Einstürzende Neubauten), Mick Harvey (of Nick Cave and the Bad Seeds), and Danielle DePicciotto, called The Ministry of Wolves. Thence forward, he has mostly written for soundtracks, but also played live with changing collaborators.

== Members and Collaborators ==
Botanica's line-up changed considerably over the years, with collaborators turning into members and vice versa. Since 2002, the core of the band consisted of Wallfisch and guitarist/songwriter John Andrews. Dana Schechter (of Bee and Flower) took over from Christian Bongers around the same time and stayed with the group up to the recording of its 2010 album Who you are. Jason Binnick already provided bass on some tracks on that album and fully replaced Schechter during subsequent live shows and what turned out to be the band's last album, What do you believe. For that album and the supporting tour, Brian Viglione of The Dresden Dolls joined the group, replacing Dave Berger.

== Discography ==
- Malediction — Checkered Past Records [1999]
- With All Seven Fingers — Subway Records/Alive Distribution [2002]
- Botanica vs. the Truth Fish — Rent A Dog/Alive Distribution [2005]
- Berlin Hi Fi — Rent A Dog/Alive [2006]
- The Magnetic Waltz — Rent A Dog/Alive/Different [2007]
- americanundone — Rent A Dog/Alive [2009]
- Who You Are — Rent A Dog/Alive [2010]
- What Do You Believe — Rent A Dog/Alive [2012]

== Compilations & Soundtracks ==
- "Broken Bicycles" on the compilation "New Coat of Paint"—Manifesto Records [2000]
- e—Rent on the Ox Fanzine compilation #49—Cargo Germany [2003]
- "Dummy" film soundtrack featuring "Dead Prophet, "Let's Go" and various film cues—Jellybean/Sony [2004]
- "Three Women" on the Between the Lines compilation—Vienna Songwriting Association/EMI Austria [2008]
