= We Rose from Your Bed with the Sun in Our Head =

2012 album

Live album (double album) by Swans
- Released: May 29, 2012
- Recorded: October 9, 2010 at Bowery Ballroom, New York City (track 3); December 13, 2010 at Volksbühne, Berlin (track 6); March 11, 2011 at East Brunswick Club Hotel, Melbourne (remainder)
- Length: 122:32
- Label: Young God
- Producer: Michael Gira

Swans chronology
| My Father Will Guide Me up a Rope to the Sky (2010) | We Rose from Your Bed with the Sun in Our Head (2012) | The Seer (2012) |

Professional ratings
Aggregate scores
| Source | Rating |
|---|---|
| Metacritic | 83/100 |
Review scores
| Source | Rating |
| Pitchfork | 8.0/10 |

We Rose from Your Bed with the Sun in Our Head is the eighth live album by American experimental rock band Swans. The album was recorded in New York City, Berlin, Germany and Melbourne, Australia during the Swans World Tour of 2010-2011. Only 1,000 copies of the album were sold, and each was numbered and signed personally by frontman Michael Gira. The album was released to help support the upcoming Swans album, The Seer.

Seven bonus tracks — demos to be featured on their upcoming album The Seer — were also released. It was re-released in 2012 as a 2-CD deluxe digipack without the bonus tracks.

== Background ==
The album was sold through the website of Young God Records, with a number of unique purchasing options. The purchasing options included an "executive producer" credit on The Seer, an original drawing by Michael Gira dedicated to the customer, the recording of a short, acoustic song praising the customer by Gira, and a "secret gift".

== Track listing ==
Disc one

| No. | Title | Length |
|---|---|---|
| 1. | "Intro" / "No Words / No Thoughts" | 23:21 |
| 2. | "Jim" | 8:16 |
| 3. | "Beautiful Child" | 8:39 |
| 4. | "The Apostate" | 16:54 |
| 5. | "Yr Property" | 7:14 |
| 6. | "Sex God Sex" | 8:06 |
| Total length: | | 72:30 |

Disc two

| No. | Title | Length |
|---|---|---|
| 1. | "The Seer" (Intro) / "I Crawled" (Later recorded together as "The Seer") | 30:46 |
| 2. | "Eden Prison" | 11:58 |
| 3. | "93 Ave. B. Blues" / "Little Mouth" ("Little Mouth" a capella) | 7:18 |
| Total length: | | 50:02 |

Bonus tracks

| No. | Title | Length |
|---|---|---|
| 4. | "Hello There" (Introduction by Gira) | 2:59 |
| 5. | "Lunacy" | 3:55 |
| 6. | "The Mother of the World" | 4:26 |
| 7. | "The Daughter Brings the Water" | 2:37 |
| 8. | "A Piece of the Sky" | 7:07 |
| 9. | "The Seer" | 3:07 |
| 10. | "Goodbye" (Outro by Gira) | 0:09 |
| Total length: | | 74:22 |

== Personnel ==
- Michael Gira - guitar, vocals
- Norman Westberg - guitar
- Phil Puleo - drums, dulcimer
- Thor Harris - drums, percussion, vibes, clarinet, melodica, violin
- Christoph Hahn - double lap steel guitar
- Christopher Pravdica - bass guitar
