= The Glowing Man =

Studio album by Swans
- Released: June 17, 2016
- Studio: Sonic Ranch (Tornillo, Texas); Elmwood Studios (Dallas, Texas); Studio Litho (Seattle, Washington); CandyBomber (Berlin); Micro-Moose (Berlin); Jen Turner's apartment (Brooklyn, New York); B.C. Studios (Brooklyn, New York)
- Genre: Experimental rock; post-rock; drone; noise rock; art rock
- Length: 118:23
- Language: English
- Label: Young God; Mute
- Producer: Michael Gira

Swans chronology
The Gate (2015)	The Glowing Man (2016)	Deliquescence (2017)

Singles from The Glowing Man
- 1. "When Will I Return?" Released: May 27, 2016; 2. "Finally, Peace." Released: November 18, 2016

The Glowing Man is the fourteenth studio album by American experimental rock band Swans, released on June 17, 2016 on Young God and Mute. It is considered the third and final part of a three-album "trilogy", the other two parts being The Seer and To Be Kind.

== Background ==
The song "The World Looks Red/The World Looks Black" contains lyrics written by frontman Michael Gira that were used in the Sonic Youth song "The World Looks Red" in 1983; the music is new, with no relation to the earlier version. Swans and Sonic Youth both developed in the early 1980s post-punk/no wave scene of New York City, and Sonic Youth's Thurston Moore was an early member of Swans appearing on the live album Body to Body, Job to Job (recorded 1982–1985, released 1991). The title track for The Glowing Man has previously been referred to as "Black Hole Man" and "Black-Eyed Man" and includes a section of "Bring the Sun / Toussaint L'Ouverture" from the 2014 album To Be Kind. The song "When Will I Return?" was uploaded to YouTube on May 27, 2016.

Prior to its appearance on The Glowing Man, "Frankie M." was part of Swans' live sets as early as 2014, its length and arrangements differing each time it was performed.

== Critical reception ==
Professional ratings
Aggregate scores
Source	Rating
AnyDecentMusic?	7.7/10
Metacritic	81/100
Review scores
Source	Rating
AllMusic	4/5 stars
The A.V. Club	B+
Consequence of Sound	B+
Financial Times	4/5 stars
Mojo	4/5 stars
Pitchfork	8.1/10
Record Collector	4/5 stars
Rolling Stone	3/5 stars
Spin	8/10
Uncut	8/10

The Glowing Man was met with widespread critical acclaim. At Metacritic, which assigns a normalized rating out of 100 to reviews from critics, the album received an average score of 81, based on 22 reviews, indicating "universal acclaim". Writing for Exclaim!, Griffin J. Elliot called the album "a meticulous exercise in the band's streamlining their abstract sound, taking what they've done before and playing it under a newer, grander spotlight". Saby Reyes-Kulkarni wrote for Pitchfork: "The love in [Gira's] music is as terrible as it is beautiful, a wrenching act of spiritual determination. Swans make this sound effortless, though, in a fitting end to a remarkable chapter of their career." Paul Simpson of AllMusic described the album as "another exhilarating portal into the unknown". Louis Pattison, writing for Uncut, claimed that the album is "gesturing towards something more contemplative" and is "certainly weathered by the journey".

In a more mixed review, Rolling Stone's Christopher R. Weingarten stated that "While their long, drawn-out, circling dark clouds remain potent, ultimately The Glowing Man is the weakest of the three powerful epics they’ve released since 2012."

Several music criticism websites included The Glowing Man on their lists of the best albums of 2016. Rockdelux ranked the album at twelfth in their top international albums of the year. Sputnikmusic ranked it at thirty-eighth, with staff member Raul Stanciu writing that "[The Glowing Man] takes an important step forward for Swans, thus deserving its place as another significant achievement in their discography". The Quietus placed the album at eighty-seventh on their list, with writer Lior Phillips writing that "the instrumentalists ripple out in meditative layers, never covering over or distracting from it, but rather reinforcing".

=== Accolades ===
Publication	Accolade	Year	Rank
The Quietus	Albums of the Year 2016	2016	87
Sputnikmusic	Staff’s Top 50 Albums of 2016	2016	38
Uncut	Top Albums of 2016	2016	46
Rolling Stone (Germany)	Top Albums of 2016	2016	16
Rockdelux	Top International Albums of 2016	2016	12
Rockerilla	Top Albums of 2016	2016	14

== Track listing ==
All music is composed by Michael Gira, Norman Westberg, Christopher Pravdica, Christoph Hahn, Thor Harris and Phil Puleo, except where noted.

Disc one
No.	Title	Music	Length
1.	"Cloud of Forgetting"		12:43
2.	"Cloud of Unknowing"		25:12
3.	"The World Looks Red / The World Looks Black"	Michael Gira	14:27
4.	"People Like Us"	Michael Gira	4:32
Total length:			56:54

Disc two
No.	Title	Music	Length
1.	"Frankie M."		20:58
2.	"When Will I Return?"	Michael Gira	5:26
3.	"The Glowing Man"		28:50
4.	"Finally, Peace."	Michael Gira	6:15
Total length:			61:29

Vinyl version (Side one)
No.	Title	Length
1.	"Cloud of Forgetting"	12:43
2.	"Cloud of Unknowing" (Part 1)	6:04

Vinyl version (Side two)
No.	Title	Length
1.	"Cloud of Unknowing" (Part 2)	19:48

Vinyl version (Side three)
No.	Title	Length
1.	"The World Looks Red / The World Looks Black"	14:27
2.	"People Like Us"	4:32

Vinyl version (Side four)
No.	Title	Length
1.	"Frankie M."	20:58

Vinyl version (Side five)
No.	Title	Length
1.	"When Will I Return?"	5:26
2.	"The Glowing Man" (Part 1)	15:02

Vinyl version (Side six)
No.	Title	Length
1.	"The Glowing Man" (Part 2)	13:55
2.	"Finally, Peace."	6:15

== Personnel ==
Adapted from the official Young God Records website:

Swans

- Michael Gira – vocals, electric and acoustic guitar
- Kristof Hahn – lap steel guitar, electric guitar, acoustic guitar, vocals
- Thor Harris – percussion, vibes and bells, hammered dulcimer
- Christopher Pravdica – bass guitar, vocals
- Phil Puleo – drums, hammered dulcimer, vocals
- Norman Westberg – electric guitar, vocals
- Bill Rieflin – drums, piano, synth, Mellotron, bass guitar, electric guitar, vocals (credited as "Hitman and 7th Swan")

Guests

- Jennifer Gira – lead vocals on "When Will I Return?", double vocal on "Finally, Peace."
- Okkyung Lee – cello on "Cloud of Unknowing"
- Bach Norwood – double bass
- Kaela Sinclair – backing vocals
- Katrina Cain – backing vocals
- Buffi Jacobs – cello
- Daniel Hart – violin
- Gerald Jones – mandolin, banjo
- Stuart Mack – trumpet
- Joakim Toftgaard – trombone
- Rachel Woolf – flute

== Charts ==
Chart (2016)	Peak position
Austrian Albums (Ö3 Austria)	24
Belgian Albums (Ultratop Flanders)	39
Belgian Albums (Ultratop Wallonia)	69
Dutch Albums (Album Top 100)	49
German Albums (Offizielle Top 100)	29
Swiss Albums (Schweizer Hitparade)	54
UK Albums (OCC)	61
US Billboard 200	151
