= Christopher Pravdica =

American musician and songwriter

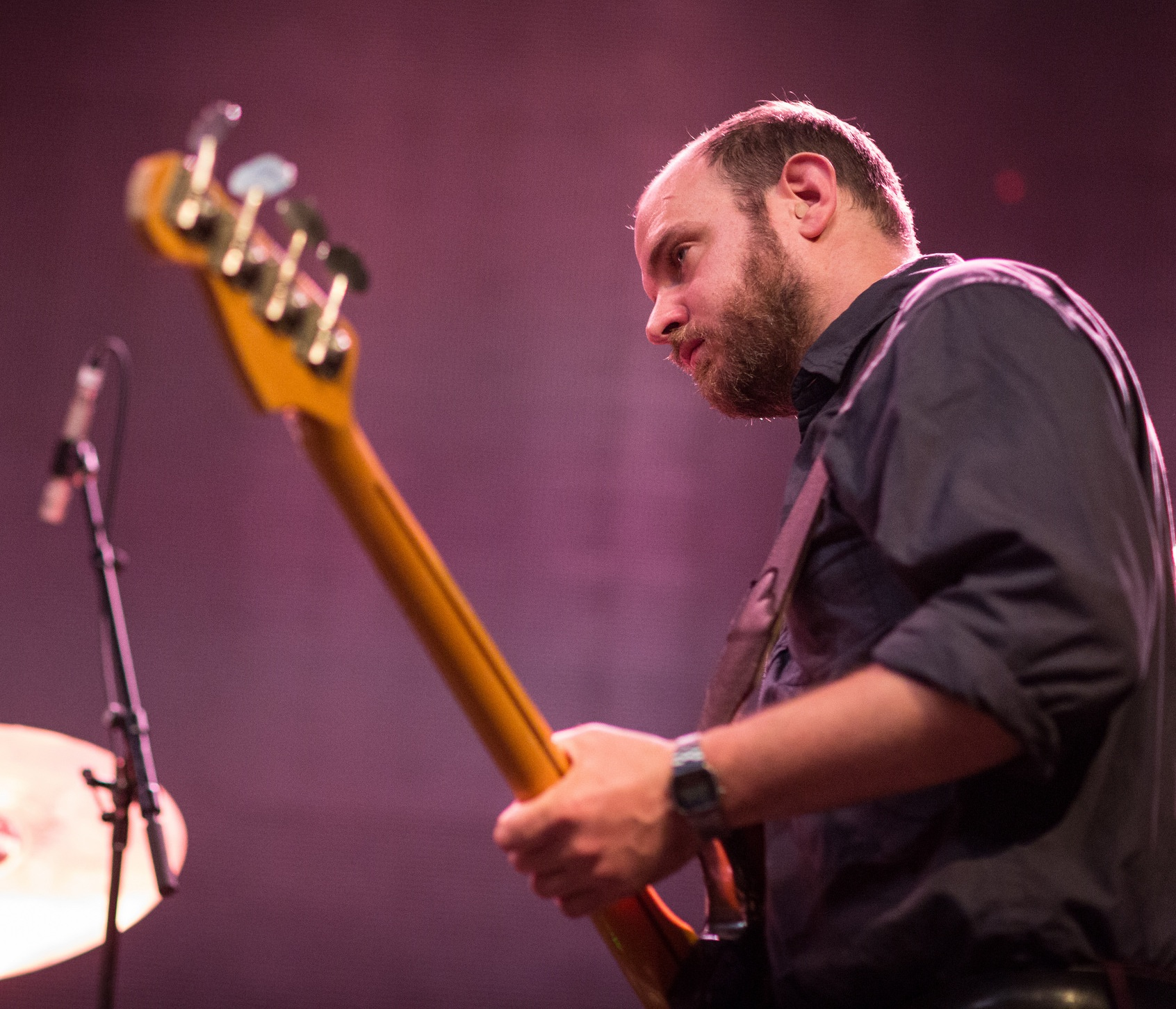
- Pravdica performing with Swans in 2014

Background information
- Born: October 2, 1975 (age 51); New York City, United States
- Genres: Experimental rock; noise rock; indie rock; art rock
- Occupations: Musician, songwriter, bartender
- Instruments: Bass guitar; guitar; jaw harp; taishogoto
- Label: Young God
- Member of: Swans
- Formerly of: Xiu Xiu, The Gunga Din, Flux Information Sciences, Services

Christopher Pravdica (born October 2, 1975) is an American musician and songwriter. He is best known as the bass guitarist of American experimental rock band Swans.

== Biography ==
Pravdica is a member of the band Human Impact, along with former members of NYC based bands Cop Shoot Cop and Unsane. Ipecac Records released their first full-length album in March 2020. He was a member of New York-based indie rock band The Gunga Din, which was founded in 1998. The band released two studio album, Introducing (1999) and Glitterati (2000). He also puts out solo music under the name We Owe. He performed with Flux Information Sciences on electronics, alongside fellow The Gunga Gin member Siobhan Duffy. After the break-up of Flux Information Sciences, Pravdica and former member Tristan Bechet founded the band Services, which released its debut album Your Desire Is My Business in 2005. In 2010, Pravdica joined Swans, which reunited that year. After the reunion, Swans released seven studio albums with Pravdica: My Father Will Guide Me up a Rope to the Sky (2010), The Seer (2012), To Be Kind (2014), The Glowing Man (2016), Leaving Meaning (2019), The Beggar (2023), and Birthing (2025).

Pravdica was once also a bartender.

== Artistry and equipment ==
Pravdica's rhythmic bass playing for Swans is characterized for its simple grooves, which takes up an important role in the band's music. The minimalist grooves are exemplified on the track "A Little God in My Hands" from To Be Kind, with its 3 note bass line. His basslines are also noted for their "texture and loudness," which cut through the mix. Brice Ezell of PopMatters described bassline of the track "She Loves Us" (To Be Kind) as a "gut-punch of a bassline" while stating: "Pravdica sounds like he could lead an army in a triumphant battle march." Ezell also similarly categorized the basslines of the tracks "Oxygen" (To Be Kind) and "Jim" (My Father Will Guide Me up a Rope to the Sky) as "infectious" and "catchy," respectively.

For his live performances for Swans, Pravdica uses a Fender Precision Bass with a pick, accompanied mainly by a distortion pedal (Fulltone GT-500) and an Ampeg head and cabinet. He also occasionally performed on acoustic guitar and Jew's harp on Swans recordings.

== Discography ==
We Owe

- Small Truth (2021)
- Major Inconvenience (2023)

With The Gunga Din

- Introducing (1999)
- Glitterati (2000)

With Services

- Your Desire Is My Business (2005)

With Swans

- My Father Will Guide Me up a Rope to the Sky (2010)
- We Rose from Your Bed with the Sun in Our Head (2012)
- The Seer (2012)
- Not Here / Not Now (2013)
- To Be Kind (2014)
- The Gate (2015)
- The Glowing Man (2016)
- Leaving Meaning (2019)
- The Beggar (2023)
- Live Rope (2024)
- Birthing (2025)
- Newly Sentient Being (2026)

Guest contributions

- The Vanity Set – The Vanity Set (2000) – fuzz bass, guitar, banjo, Jew's harp
- The Vanity Set / Sally Norvell – "Jump in the Grave"/"Exit Music (For a Film)" (2001) – guitar
