= What Is This? (Swans album) =

Demo album by Swans
- Released: March 2019
- Studios: Marcata Studio (tracks 1–8); Gira's home studio (tracks 9 & 10)
- Length: 67:45
- Label: Young God
- Producer: Michael Gira

Swans chronology
Deliquescence (2017)	What Is This? (2019)	Leaving Meaning (2019)

What Is This? is a 2019 limited-edition fundraiser album by American experimental rock band Swans. The album was released in March 2019 on band leader Michael Gira's Young God Records. Limited to 2,500 copies, the album served as a fundraiser for the fifteenth Swans album, Leaving Meaning, which was released in October 2019.

== Background ==
The album includes demos that were worked on with a full band for the following Swans record, Leaving Meaning. Songs include reworkings of previous Swans and Gira songs, such as "Amnesia", "Annaline" and "The Knot" (itself a reworking of "No Words / No Thoughts"). Unlike Swans' previous fundraiser albums (with the exception of Gira's I Am Not Insane), What Is This? exclusively contains acoustic demo tracks.

Songs not recorded or left off the release include "You Will Pay" (also known as "You Must Pay"), a rearranged version of 1989's "God Damn the Sun", an untitled "organ thing" and an untitled "long song".

== Track listing ==
All tracks are written by Michael Gira.

No.	Title	Length
1.	"Leaving Meaning" (Previously referred to as "Prayer Thing")	6:32
2.	"The Hanging Man"	10:02
3.	"Amnesia" (New arrangement)	6:10
4.	"The Nub"	5:50
5.	"Cathedrals of Heaven" (Reworking of the end of "The Knot", also previously referred to as "Prayer Thing")	6:20
6.	"Sunfucker"	6:30
7.	"What Is This?"	5:21
8.	"My Phantom Limb" (Previously referred to as "The Secret Sharer")	11:25
9.	"Annaline" (Previously released on Gira's I Am Not This)	3:50
10.	"It's Coming and It's Real" (Previously referred to as "The Last Song", later titled "It's Coming It's Real")	5:49
Total length:		67:45

== Personnel ==
- Michael Gira – guitar, vocals, artwork
- Jennifer Gira – vocals on "The Nub"
- Nicole Boitos – artwork
- Doug Henderson – mastering
- Kevin McMahon – recording
