= Paul Wallfisch =

American musician

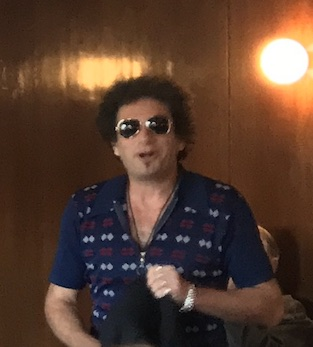
Image of Paul Wallfisch

Paul Wallfisch (born September 18, 1962) is an American musician who specializes in German multimedia theater productions. He works extensively in Western Europe and makes his home in Harlem, New York, United States.

== Early childhood ==
Paul Wallfisch was born in Basel, Switzerland, to classically trained musicians Lory Wallfisch and Ernst Wallfisch. His parents performed as a duo, with his mother on piano and harpsichord and his father on viola, violin and viola da gamba. The family moved to Northampton, Massachusetts, in early 1964.

== Musical career ==
Paul Wallfisch recorded eight albums with his band Botanica. He has also contributed to dozens of other albums and toured with artists including Firewater, Love and Rockets, Congo Norvell, Angela McCluskey, Syl Sylvain, Stiv Bators, Anne Pigalle, Johnny Hallyday and others across the globe, primarily in Europe and Asia. He has also worked with Little Annie, and produced her album, Genderful (2010).

Wallfisch has played in many groups over the years, such as Little Annie, Swans, Ministry of Wolves, and his own group Botanica. Wallfisch has played in the duo Little Annie, opening for bands such as Swans. Wallfisch joined Swans as a member of the touring band in 2016. He is now the musical director at Volkstheater Wien.
