= Swans (band) =

American experimental rock band

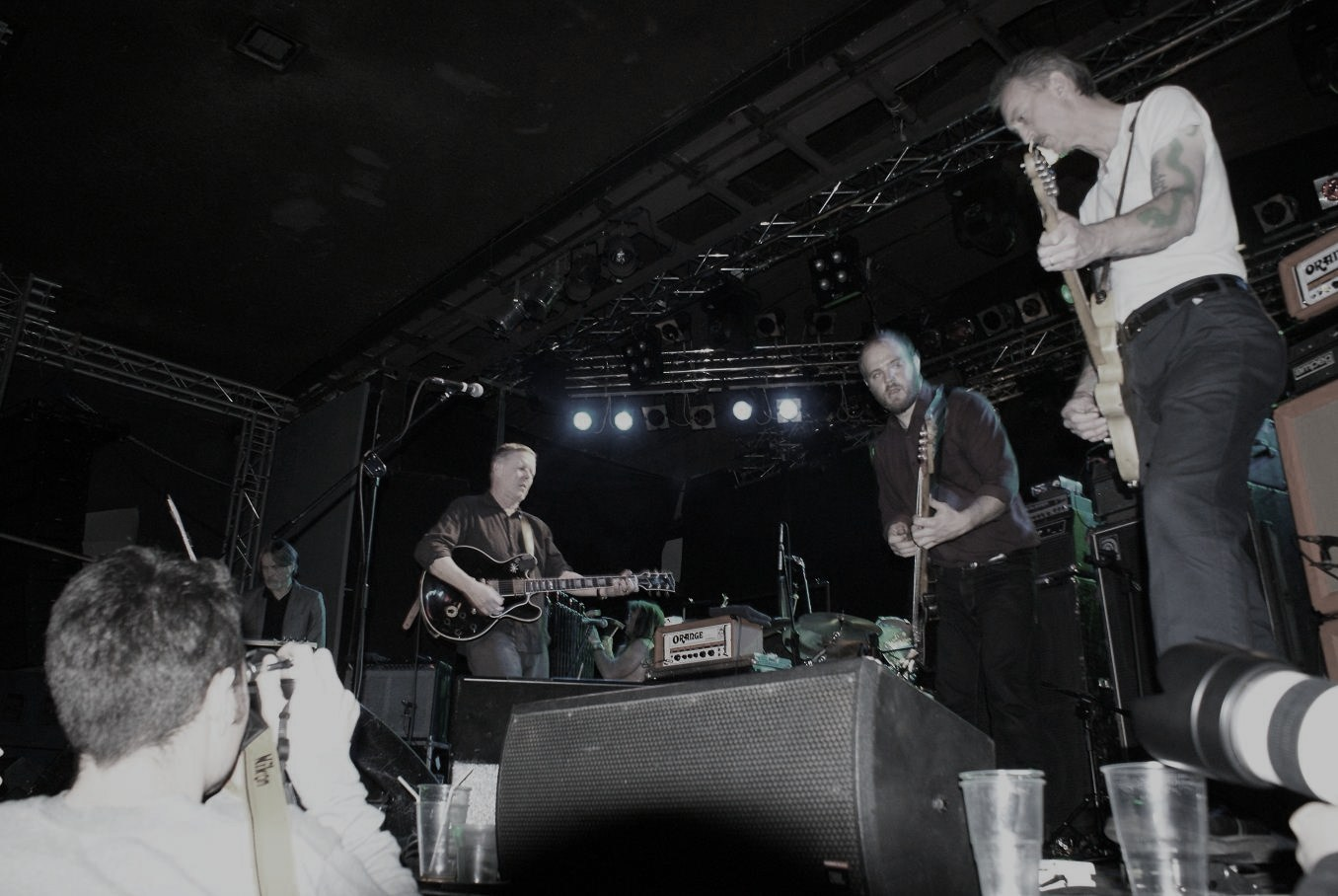
- Swans performing live in Warsaw in December 2010. From left to right: Kristof Hahn on lap steel, Michael Gira on guitar, Thor Harris on percussion, Chris Pravdica on bass guitar, and Norman Westberg on guitar. Phil Puleo is seated behind the drum kit.

Background information
- Origin: New York City, U.S.
- Genres: Experimental rock; industrial; drone; post-punk; noise rock; neofolk; post-rock
- Works: Swans discography
- Years active: 1981–1997; 2010–present
- Labels: Young God; Neutral; Homestead; Caroline; Uni/MCA; Invisible; Atavistic; Mute; Some Bizzare
- Spinoffs: Angels of Light; The Body Lovers / The Body Haters; World of Skin
- Spinoff of: Circus Mort
- Members: Michael Gira; Kristof Hahn; Christopher Pravdica; Phil Puleo; Larry Mullins; Dana Schechter; Norman Westberg
- Past members: Dan Braun; Bill Bronson; Harry Crosby; Anton Fier; Daniel Galli-Duani; Joe Goldring; Ronaldo Gonzalez; Sue Hanel; Thor Harris; Jarboe; Jonathan Kane; Algis Kizys; Mojo; Thurston Moore; Virgil Moorefield; Roli Mosimann; Ivan Nahem; Ted Parsons; Bob Pezzola; Bill Rieflin; Yoyo Röhm; Vinnie Signorelli; Clint Steele; Jonathan Tessler; Jenny Wade; Paul Wallfisch; Ben Frost
- Website: younggodrecords.com

Swans are an American experimental rock band formed in 1981 by singer, songwriter and multi-instrumentalist Michael Gira. One of the few acts to emerge from the New York City–based no wave scene and stay intact into the next decade, Swans have become recognized for an ever-changing sound, exploring genres such as noise rock, post-punk, industrial and post-rock. Initially, their music was known for its sonic brutality and misanthropic lyrics. Following the addition of singer, songwriter and keyboardist Jarboe in 1986, Swans began to incorporate melody and intricacy into their music. Jarboe remained the band's only constant member with Gira and semi-constant guitarist Norman Westberg until their dissolution in 1997.

In 2010, Gira re-formed the band without Jarboe, establishing a stable lineup of musicians which toured worldwide and released several albums to critical acclaim. This iteration of the group performed its last shows in November 2017, ending the tour in support of its then most recent album The Glowing Man. Since 2019, Gira has been touring and recording with Swans as "a revolving cast of contributors". The band's latest album, Birthing, was released on May 30, 2025. Since 1990, all Swans records have been released through Gira's own label, Young God Records.

== History ==
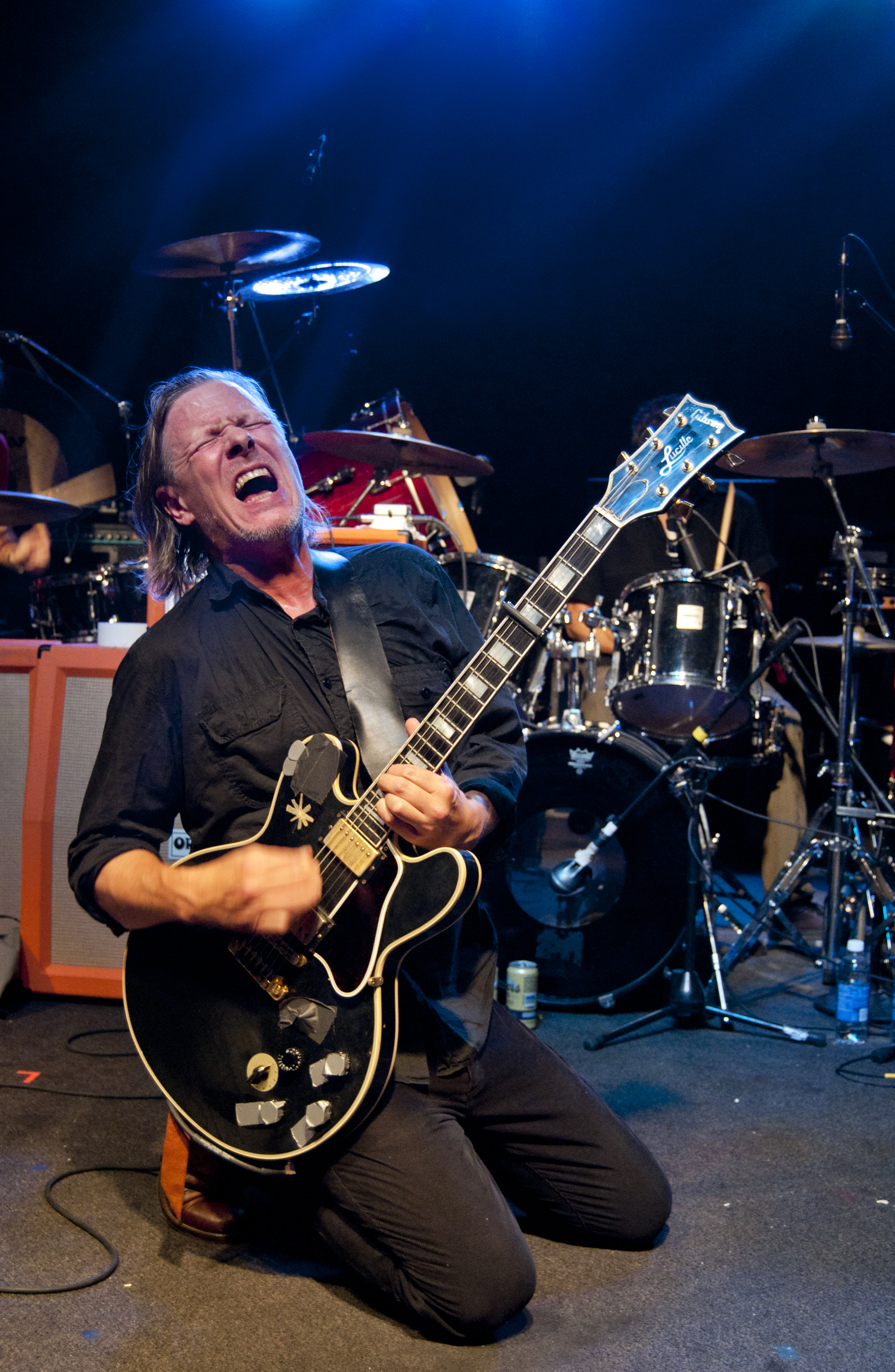
The band was formed and has been led by singer, songwriter and multi-instrumentalist Michael Gira, here shown performing in Kansas City, Missouri in September 2012.

=== Early years (1982–1985) ===
==== Initial influences ====
The earliest known lineup of Swans comprised Gira on bass guitar and vocals, Jonathan Kane on drums, Sue Hanel on guitar, Mojo on percussion and tape loops and Thurston Moore, Dan Braun or Jonathan Tessler on the second bass guitar. Tessler also played metal percussion and tape loops in another variation of the line-up with Gira on bass, Moore on guitar, and Kane on drums. Hanel's only recordings with the group are on the compilation Body to Body, Job to Job, but the ambiguous personnel credits do not make it clear on which songs she performed. Kane stated that "Sue was the most fearsome guitarist we'd ever heard in New York. She was unbelievable."

Hanel did not stay long in the group, and by the time of their recording debut she had been replaced by Bob Pezzola. This lineup of the group also featured saxophonist Daniel Galli-Duani, who had previously played with Kane as the avant-garde duo Transmission. The debut EP, Swans, released on Labor, is markedly different from anything they would do later. However, the minimal chord structures owe more to blues, while the jazz instrumentation and awkward time signatures are evidence of Swans' roots in the no wave scene of the late 1970s, which had more or less collapsed by the release of 1984's Cop.

==== Early style ====
Kane compares Swans to blues icon Chester Burnett, a.k.a. Howlin' Wolf. Some similarities worth noting—the music of early Swans was often based on a single riff, played repeatedly to hypnotic effect. Some of Burnett's songs—especially the songs penned by Burnett himself—have a similar structure and quality. Their early music was typified by slow and grinding guitar noise, and pounding drums, punctuated by Gira's morbid and violent lyrics (inspired by Jean Genet and Marquis de Sade), usually barked or shouted. Critics have described Swans' early recordings as "aggressive beyond words".

Their first full-length release, Filth (1983), featured driving, choppy rhythms and abrasive drums. The whole is reminiscent of earlier no wave bands, such as Mars, and the work of Swans' contemporaries, like Sonic Youth's Confusion Is Sex and Kill Yr Idols; but critic Ned Raggett contends that "early Swans really is like little else on the planet before or since". Filth was the first album to feature guitarist Norman Westberg, who would play a vital role in much of Swans' music and would feature on every subsequent studio album apart from Love of Life.

Cop (1984) and the originally untitled Young God EP were both released in 1984 and re-released together on CD in 1992. Young God has been known by several names, usually by one of its two A-sides, such as "I Crawled" or, notoriously, as "Raping a Slave". This release is often confused with their self-titled debut. The music continues in the same vein as Filth, and is again vaguely reminiscent of heavy metal music played in extreme slow motion. Swans were, in this era, Gira on vocals, Westberg on guitar, Harry Crosby on bass guitar and Roli Mosimann on drums. Gira's vocals had changed slightly, becoming slowly more melodic, although the snarl still remained. Some of the songs on the EP, particularly "Young God" and "I Crawled", have an actual vocal melody, if rudimentary, hinting at the sounds of future releases.

Godflesh frontman Justin Broadrick shared this impression of the group:

The Slave EP was a sound that I always wanted to hear, just the bleakest and blackest. The minimalist approach of the music, that was what really influenced me. It was non-genre-specific, with a total lack of baggage... purely abstract, surreal, and violent. It communicated to me in a very special way, and taught me that heavy metal could be stripped of everything and reduced to its most primal form. ... Swans ... paved the way for me.

==== Live shows ====
One of the trademarks of Swans' early period was playing at painfully loud volumes during concerts, sometimes leading to police stopping shows. Gira was also notably confrontational with the audience, such as stepping on people's fingers resting on the stage, pulling people's hair and, notably, physically assaulting anyone caught in the crowd headbanging, something Gira detested. This lent a reputation to the name Swans which was one of the contributing factors in Gira's retirement of the band in 1997.

Since Swans' re-formation, Gira has made a point of maintaining the intensity of their live show, stating that it is at once "soul-uplifting and body-destroying". He has also sometimes turned off the air conditioning before Swans performed and compared the experience to a Native American sweat lodge.

=== Stylistic shift (1986–1988) ===
1986's Greed was not as brutal or noisy as Swans' previous releases, while still being an extremely ominous and dark record. It also saw two new and significant musicians join the group. New bassist Algis Kizys would become a long-time, near-constant member, as would new vocalist/keyboardist Jarboe (who had joined the band a month before the release of the 1985 "Time Is Money (Bastard)" 12-inch, on which she had been credited simply with "scream").

Greed was followed by its "twin" album, Holy Money, the first to feature Jarboe contributing lead vocals (on "You Need Me"). Her presence began a slow thawing in the overt brutality and energy of Swans' early work, while Holy Money was also the first album by the group to incorporate acoustic elements: in particular, the eight-minute dirge "Another You", which starts with a bluesy harmonica introduction. It also marks the introduction of religious themes in Swans records with the sacrificial ode "A Hanging", complete with gospel-like backing vocals from Jarboe. (Jarboe would also sing lead on "Blackmail", a B-side from the A Screw 12". Both tracks appeared on the original CD version of Holy Money and the Greed/Holy Money compilation, while a minimal version of the latter also appears on Children of God.)

Children of God (1987) further expanded Jarboe's role, acting as a foil to Michael Gira's tales of suffering, torture and humiliation. The stories portrayed here, however, are ever the more unusual, given their juxtaposition—and admixture—with religious imagery. The intention was neither to mock nor embrace religion, but experiment with the power inherent in its messages and the hypocrisy of many of its leaders.

Some songs, such as "Beautiful Child", retain the vocal style of earlier days, but many are quite tame. The almost baroque "In My Garden", for example, added an extra dimension with piano (used before on "Fool" and "Sealed in Skin" to far grimmer effect) and acoustic guitar. In between the two poles, there are pieces like "Sex, God, Sex" (heavy metal-like bass riffs with blues and gospel-inspired singing), "Blood and Honey" (a murder ballad with early post-rock tendencies) and "Blind Love" (a lengthy song, alternating between intoned vocals and violent instrumental passages). Gira considers this to be the band's major turning point, saying by 1986/7 Swans "had run its course with the physical assault of sound that they had employed previously for the most part. I wanted to move on to other things and didn't want to get stuck in some style, which in our case had the potential of becoming cartoonish if we'd continued in that direction.

=== Later years (1988–1997) ===
After the Children of God album, Gira professed himself tired with the band's fearsome reputation for noise, feeling that their audience now had expectations that he had no intention of fulfilling. He made a conscious decision to tone down the band's sound, introducing more acoustic elements and increasingly emphasizing Jarboe as a singer. The first results of this shift in direction were the two records recorded by Gira and Jarboe under the names Skin (in Europe) and World of Skin (in the US). The first, Blood, Women, Roses, featured Jarboe on lead vocals, and the second, Shame, Humility, Revenge, featured Gira on lead vocals. Both were recorded together in 1987, although Shame, Humility, Revenge was not released until 1988. These albums are full of slow, ethereal, melancholy, dirge-like songs, sounding like stripped-down acoustic versions of the Children of God songs.

The band continued this transformation with an unexpected cover of Joy Division's "Love Will Tear Us Apart", which was released as a single in 1988 on Product Inc. in a confusing array of 7" and 12" inch formats. Both Gira and Jarboe sang lead vocals on different versions of the song. In later years Gira dismissed this release as a mistake, and for a long time refused to reissue his own vocal version, although Jarboe's version was re-released much sooner. However their version of the song was a hit on US college radio in 1988, which led to the group being offered a major label deal at Uni/MCA. "I'd worked so hard all my life", said Gira. "At 15, I was digging ditches in the desert, and I put myself through college painting houses. I never saw any money from any of our records. So by the time I finally got that carrot dangled in front of me, it was like, 'at last, I can make a living at what I love to do'."

This single was followed by The Burning World (1989), Swans' first and only major label album. Released on Uni/MCA Records, the record was produced by Bill Laswell and expanded the acoustic palette introduced on Greed and Children of God. For this album, the core line-up of Michael Gira, Jarboe and Westberg was augmented by session musicians, and the distinctive heavy guitar element of their earlier work was toned down significantly in favor of folk and world music elements. Though Swans would later explore more acoustic music with similar moods, Gira has stated that, while he admires much of Laswell's work, his efforts with Swans were simply a mismatch. The album reportedly sold 5000 copies in the UK, one of the lowest numbers in the history of MCA Records, and was soon deleted from MCA's catalogue.

The Burning World was the first Swans album to feature more conventional pop melodies. Gira's lyrics still favored themes of depression, death, greed and despair, but were actually sung, rather than the chanting or shouting typical of earlier material. They even covered Steve Winwood's popular Blind Faith hit "Can't Find My Way Home", one of two singles from the LP.

In 1990, Gira and Jarboe released the third and final World of Skin album, Ten Songs for Another World. It was less successful than the previous two Skin albums.

Gira's disillusionment with their Uni/MCA exploits led to White Light from the Mouth of Infinity (1991), a successful blending of earlier hard rock and later pop styles. Produced by Gira, the album blended acoustic rock, blues and hypnotic guitar noise successfully, resulting in an album more complex than anything they had released in the past. This album was followed by Love of Life (recorded by Martin Bisi in 1992), the EP single Love of Life/Amnesia, taking the group even farther into experimentation, and then The Great Annihilator (1995), considered to be one of the band's most accessible releases, possibly through being their most straightforward. The songwriting style and musical approach, however, would take a more unusual turn the following year.

==== Demise ====
With other projects occupying his time, Gira decided to end the group with one last studio album and a world tour. Soundtracks for the Blind (1996) was a two-disc album featuring Jarboe-supplied field recordings, experimental music, dark ambient soundscapes, post-industrial epics, post-rock suites and acoustic guitar. In 1998, Swans Are Dead was released, consisting of live recordings from their 1995 and 1997 tours. In an interview, Gira revealed that there is more live material that may be released in the future. He described these unreleased recordings as "fairly spectacular".

After dissolving Swans, Gira formed Angels of Light, continued his work with Young God Records and Jarboe continued her solo work.

=== Reformation and "big sound" era (2010–2025) ===
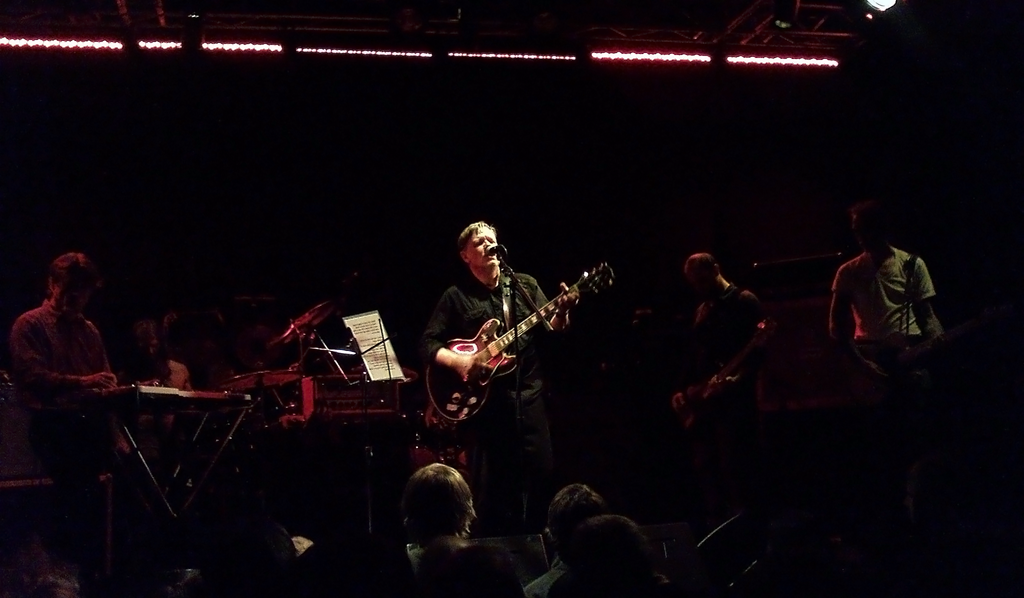
The re-formed Swans performing in Tallinn in May 2011. From left to right: Thor Harris, Christoph Hahn, Phil Puleo (behind drum set), Gira, Chris Pravdica and Norman Westberg.

In January 2010, Swans' re-formation was heralded with a new song posted on the Young God Records' MySpace, and officially confirmed by a post on the Young God Records Facebook and MySpace accounts. Gira decided to bring back Swans during an Angels of Light show five years prior. In the middle of performing the song The Provider onstage utilizing "large chords that were very sustained and swaying, in this sort of slave-ship rhythm", he felt "a nascent urge right then to re-form or reinvigorate Swans because I remembered how elevating and intense that experience was". To help raise money for the upcoming new Swans album, Gira released a new solo album, I Am Not Insane, via his Young God Records website. LAS Magazine posted an article entitled "Kickstart My Art" on alternative financing in "a cash-strapped music industry, unable to rely on record label financing, [that] is positioning its own quid pro quo: fan dollars to fund projects in exchange for exclusive material and a sense of involvement" that cites Swans selling out of the 1,000 signed and numbered copies of I Am Not Insane as an example of reverse financing where proceeds from one project are rolled over to finance the next.

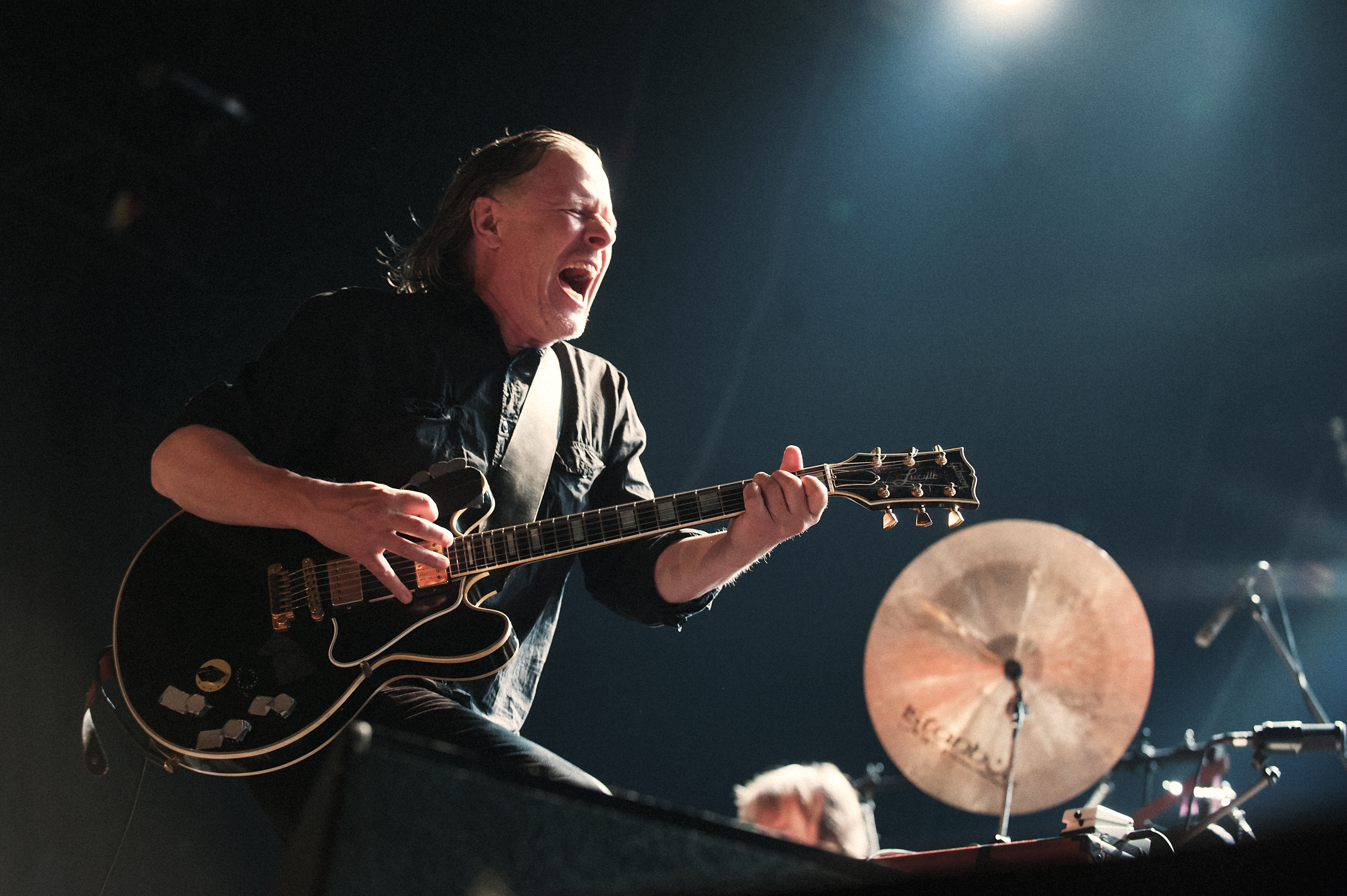
Gira performing with Swans at OFF Festival 2012

Swans then went on a series of U.S. and European tour dates, and headlined the Supersonic Festival in Birmingham, England in October 2010. The first post-reformation Swans album, My Father Will Guide Me up a Rope to the Sky, was released on September 23, 2010, and the band simultaneously embarked on an eighteen-month world tour. The band were chosen by Portishead to perform at the All Tomorrow's Parties I'll Be Your Mirror festivals that Portishead curated in July 2011 at London's Alexandra Palace, and, in September 2011, in Asbury Park, New Jersey.

In 2012 Swans released the live album We Rose from Your Bed with the Sun in Our Head, featuring material culled from their 2010–2011 tour, in support of production and recording costs for their forthcoming record The Seer. Initially released as a limited handmade edition of 1000 copies, We Rose... was re-released in May 2012 as a deluxe digipak. On July 15, 2013, Gira announced a new, handmade live album in the vein of I Am Not Insane and We Rose..., titled Not Here / Not Now. The album was announced for sale on October 14, with the proceeds helping to fund the recording of the new Swans studio album with John Congleton, announced in 2014 as To Be Kind.

In 2014 the band announced that it signed with Mute Records for the world outside North America and that the band would be touring. That same year, in November, the band curated a three-day program at Le Guess Who? in Utrecht, The Netherlands, including Wire, Silver Apples, Ben Frost, Prurient and Words to the Blind, a project by Savages together with Japanese band Bo Ningen.

In 2014 both The Seer and To Be Kind were ranked on Pitchfork's "Top 100 Albums of the Decade So Far 2010–2014". The Seer was ranked 17, and To Be Kind was ranked 85.

The band announced on July 22, 2015, that they would be recording their fourteenth studio album in September 2015, following a fundraiser album entitled The Gate, as with the three previous post-reunion studio albums. On April 5, 2016, the band announced The Glowing Man and shared a two-minute excerpt of the twenty-nine minute title track. The album was released on June 17, 2016, on Young God Records and Mute Records, and is the final Swans album released under a mostly homogeneous lineup, although Gira continues to record Swans music with "a revolving cast" of musicians, as of 2019.

This final incarnation of the band announced for immediate release a live album, Deliquescence, on May 17. The album, limited to 3,000 CD-only copies, contains three tracks that have previously only been played live.

Following a nearly year-long break from Swans, Gira announced a brief tour of new Swans material playing along the West Coast of the United States, which started in September 2018 accompanied by longtime Swans guitarist Norman Westberg with recording of a new album commencing in Berlin in February 2019. The fifteenth Swans album was preceded (and financed) by another fundraiser album of demos, What Is This?, released in March 2019. Updates between June and August 2019 confirmed that the upcoming album was fully recorded, mixed and mastered. On September 5, the album was revealed to be called Leaving Meaning, and a single from the album titled "It's Coming It's Real" was released. The album itself was released on October 25. It features guitarist Christoph Hahn, percussionist Larry Mullins and bassist Yoyo Röhm as main contributors. In 2019, a documentary about the band, called Where Does a Body End?, was also released by Italian-American director Marco Porsia. In March 2021, Gira announced a new Swans album with an Instagram post of a tracklist.

On January 6, 2022, Michael Gira announced on his Instagram that a new fundraiser album was available via Young God Records, called Is There Really a Mind?. The fundraiser album sold out in just nine days. Young God Records said Swans would begin recording in April 2022. On March 22, 2023, the album was revealed to be titled The Beggar, and a single from the album titled "Paradise Is Mine" was released. The Beggar was released on June 23, 2023.

In July 2024, Gira announced a live album Live Rope, recorded at performances in 2023 and 2024, and intended to fund the creation of another Swans album. On November 15, 2024, Gira announced on Instagram that the album would be titled Birthing, to be mixed in Berlin that month and released in 2025, and described it as "the final "big sound" Swans album:

Going forward (after the release of Birthing and its subsequent tours), things will be simpler and more intimate for Swans. When that time comes, I look forward to discovering a fresh path towards a new sonic terrain in which to dwell.

"I Am a Tower", the first single from Birthing, was released on February 25, 2025. The album was also given a release date of May 30, 2025. Swans embarked on a 2025 tour in the United States and Europe in support of Birthing, which Gira stated would be the last one featuring "big sound".

=== Recent activities (2026–present) ===
On March 15, 2026, the band announced via social media that the writing for a new album had been completed, though what this means remains unclear. Newly Sentient Being, a live album documenting the band's 2025 tour, was released on October 2, 2026.

== Musical style and legacy ==
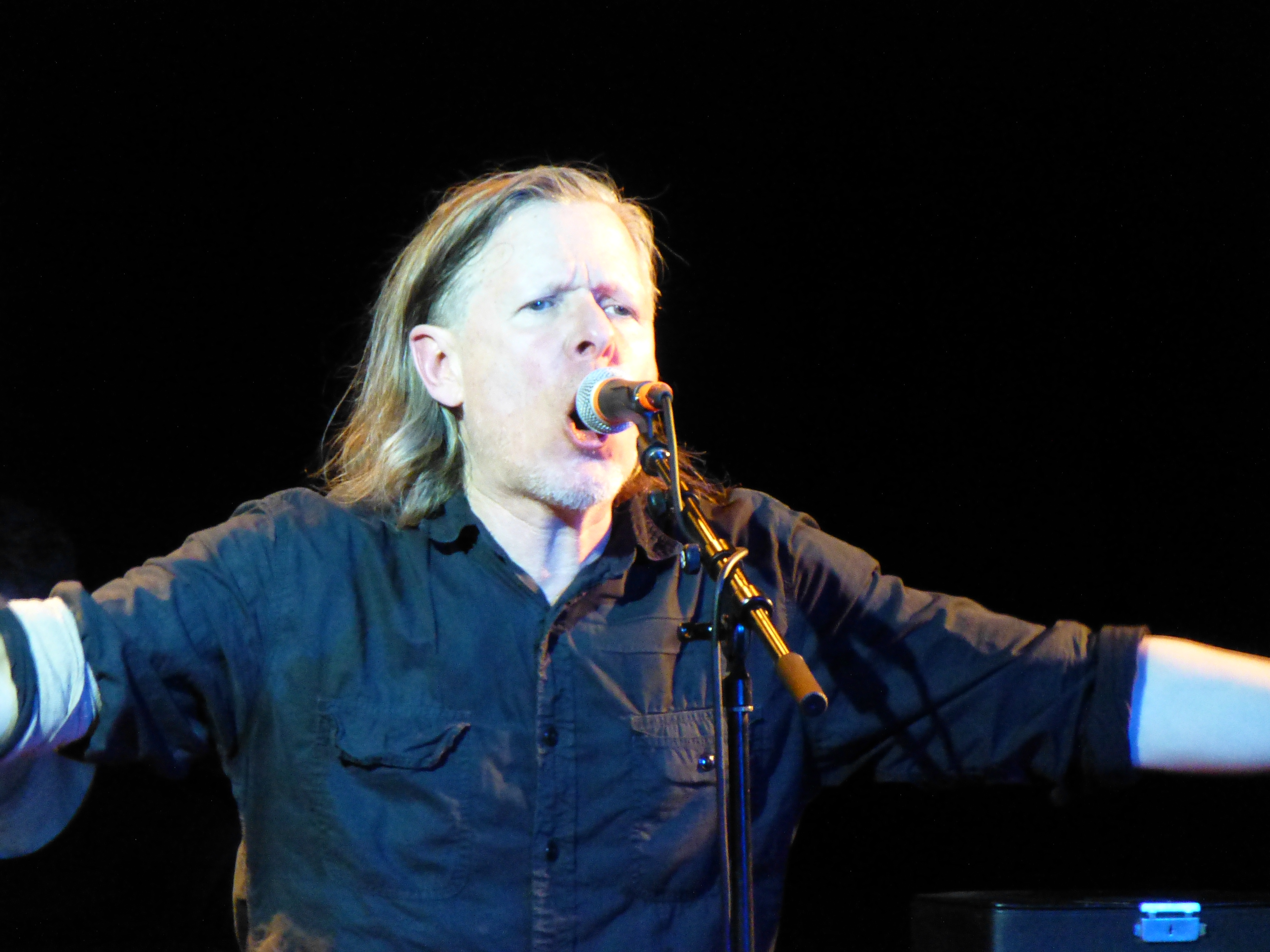
Gira performing with Swans at Stylus, University of Leeds in April 2013

Swans' music has transformed greatly over the decades, but is typically dark and "apocalyptic", often focusing on themes of power, religion, sex and death, and has been most generally associated with experimental rock. According to Spin, the band demonstrates "unparalleled ability to translate the absurd violence of the human condition into music that's as intoxicating as it is intense."

Their early work, rooted in the New York City-based no wave movement which was fading out by the time of their formation in 1982, is extremely aggressive, characterized by Michael Gira as "stripping down the essential elements of what we consider to be rock music". The Guardian described it as "a cacophonous rhythmic throb which drew on post-punk, industrial, doom metal, NYC avant minimalism and the blues; a sound which was matched by Gira's often nihilistic, anti-natalist and existential lyrical concerns ... delivered in a stentorian and messianic manner". It was a contribution to both industrial music and noise rock and influenced the emergence of grindcore (inspiring also the use of "grind" in musical context) and sludge metal. Later in the 1980s, Swans' music began to incorporate more melodic and intricate elements, especially since Jarboe's debut as a songwriter on 1987's Children of God. While generally maintaining much dissonance, the band's subsequent work further ventured into genres such as post-punk, gothic rock, neofolk, psychedelic rock and art rock. Their final album before breaking up, 1996's Soundtracks for the Blind, is a double album which emphasizes atmosphere, branching into post-rock, drone and dark ambient. Since re-forming in 2010, they have continued to be associated with post-rock and drone music as well as noise rock. The double albums from the latest years, which have brought them widespread critical acclaim, often feature long songs that develop complex soundscapes.

Swans have been cited as an influence by a variety of rock and extreme metal musicians, including members of Napalm Death, Godflesh, Melvins, Neurosis, Treponem Pal, Nirvana, Tool, Maruja, My Dying Bride, Isis, Weakling, Leviathan, Natural Snow Buildings, Khanate, Liturgy, Vision Eternel, Car Seat Headrest, Eyehategod, Full of Hell, and Sprain.

== Members ==
=== Current ===
- Michael Gira – lead vocals, guitar, bass, tape loops, keyboards (1981–1997, 2010–present)
- Norman Westberg – guitar, vocals (1983–1990, 1993–1995, 2010–2017, 2019, 2024–present)
- Kristof Hahn (also known as Christoph Hahn) – guitar, lap steel guitar, backing vocals (1989–1992, 2010–2017, 2019–present)
- Larry Mullins – drums, Mellotron, percussion, backing vocals (1995–1996, 2019–present)
- Phil Puleo – drums, percussion, dulcimer, backing vocals (1997, 2010–2017, 2019–present)
- Christopher Pravdica – bass, backing vocals, taishōgoto (2010–2017, 2019–present)
- Dana Schechter – bass, lap steel guitar, keyboards (2019–present)

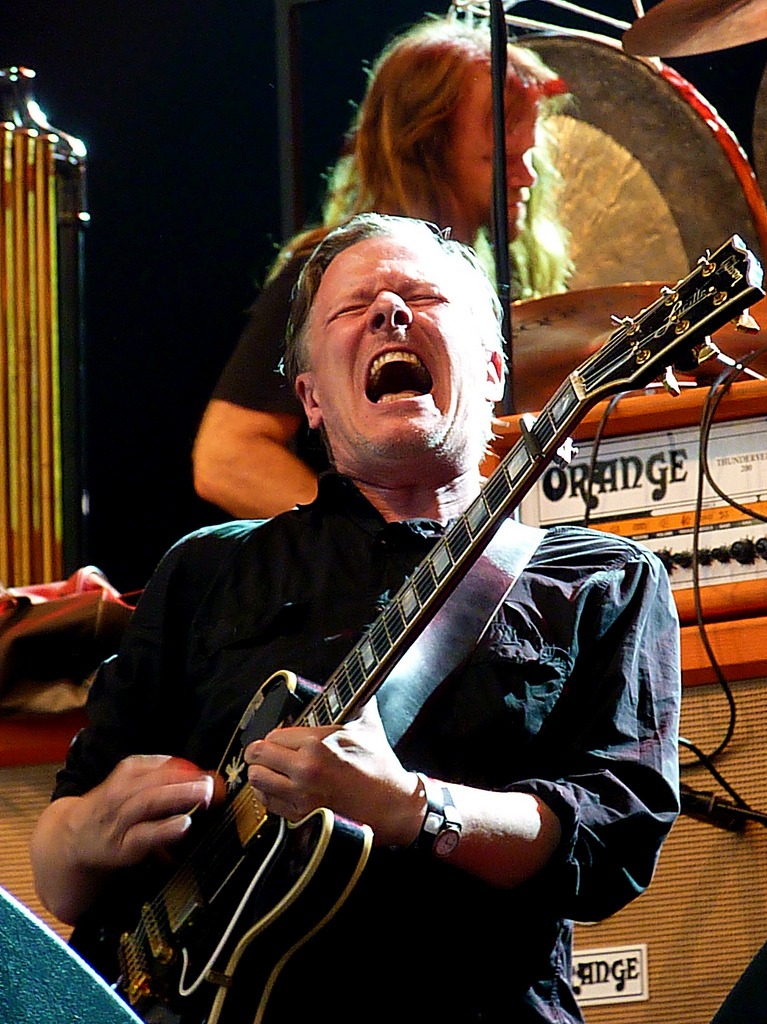
Michael Gira

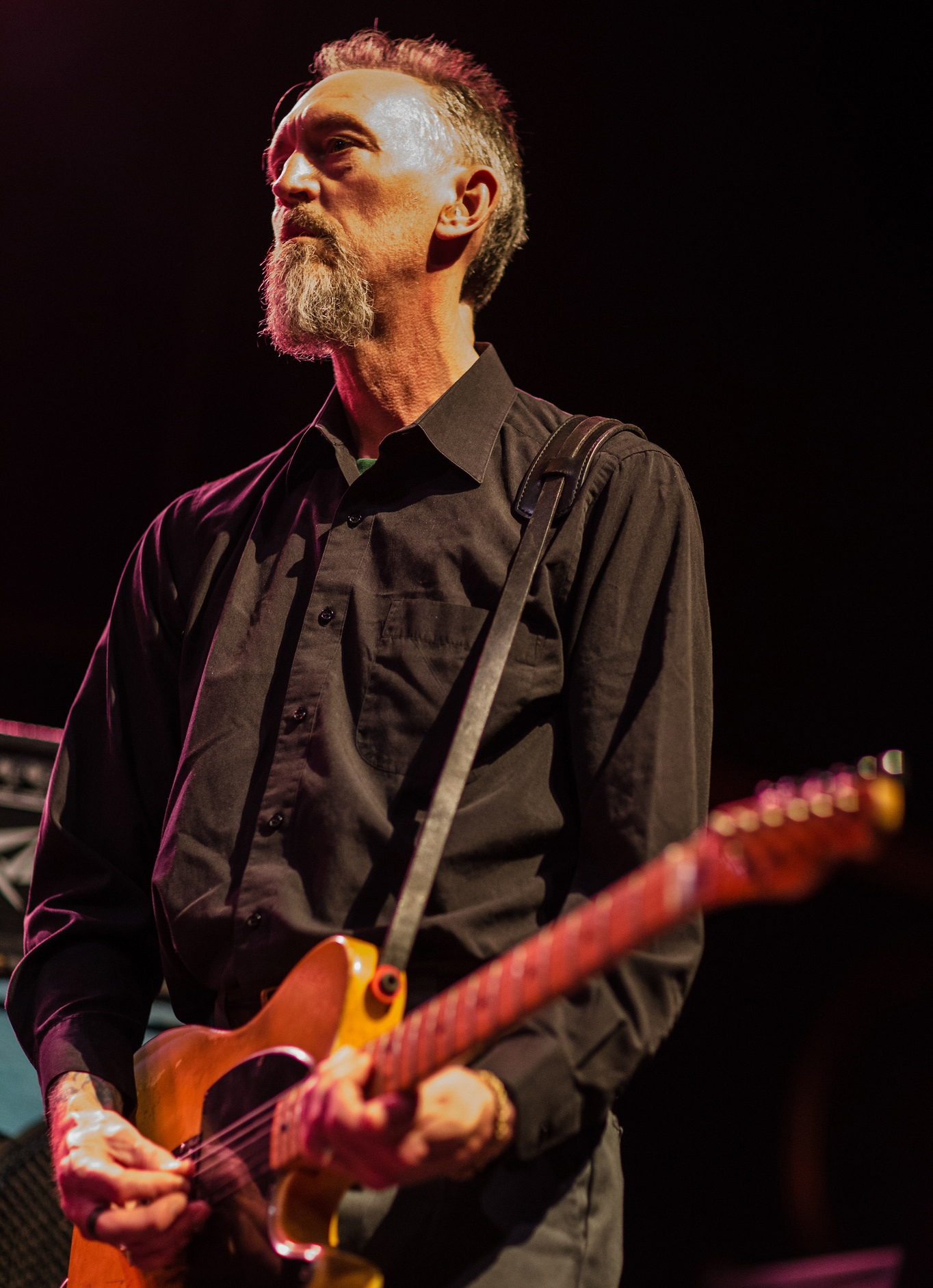
Norman Westberg

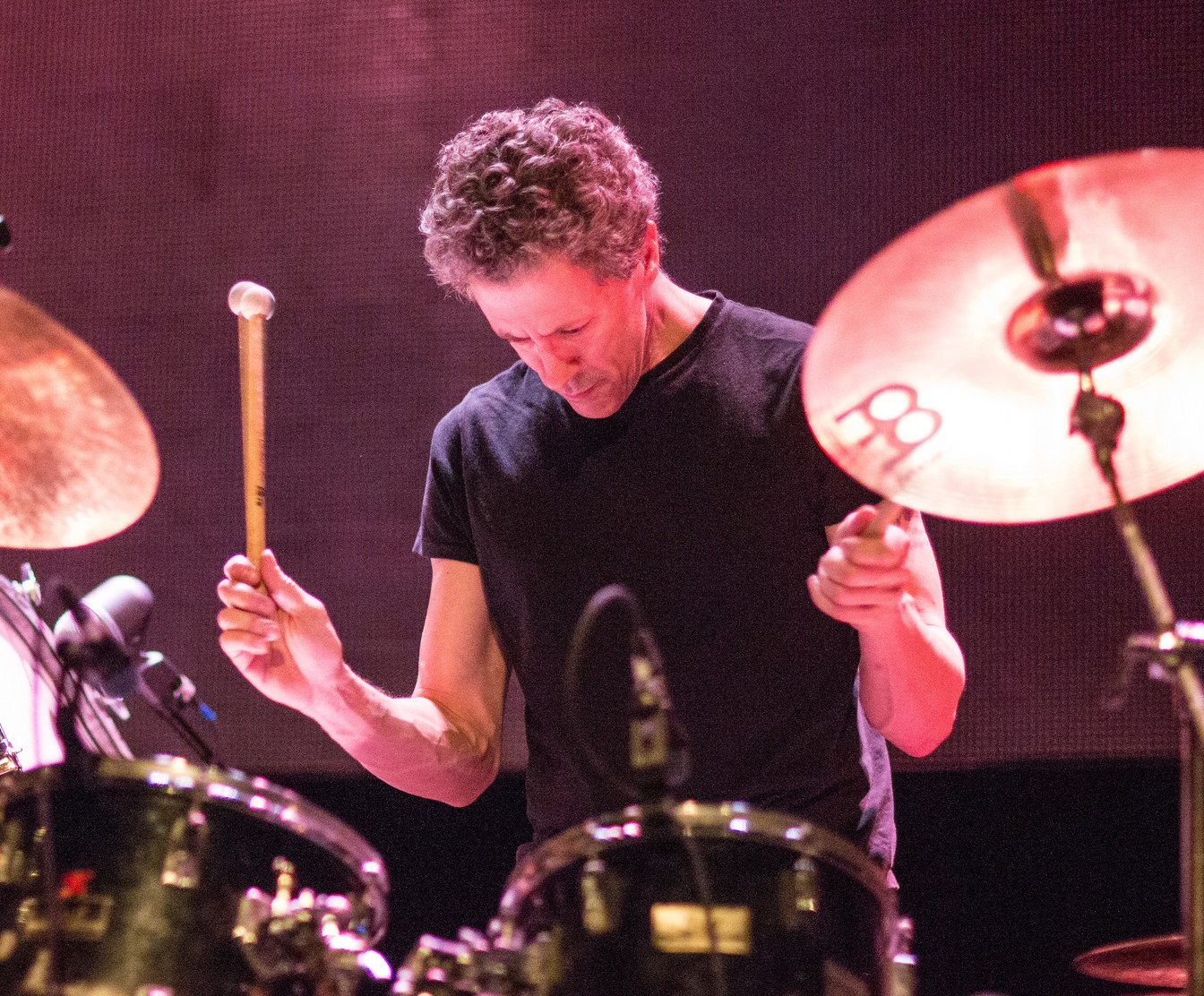
Phil Puleo

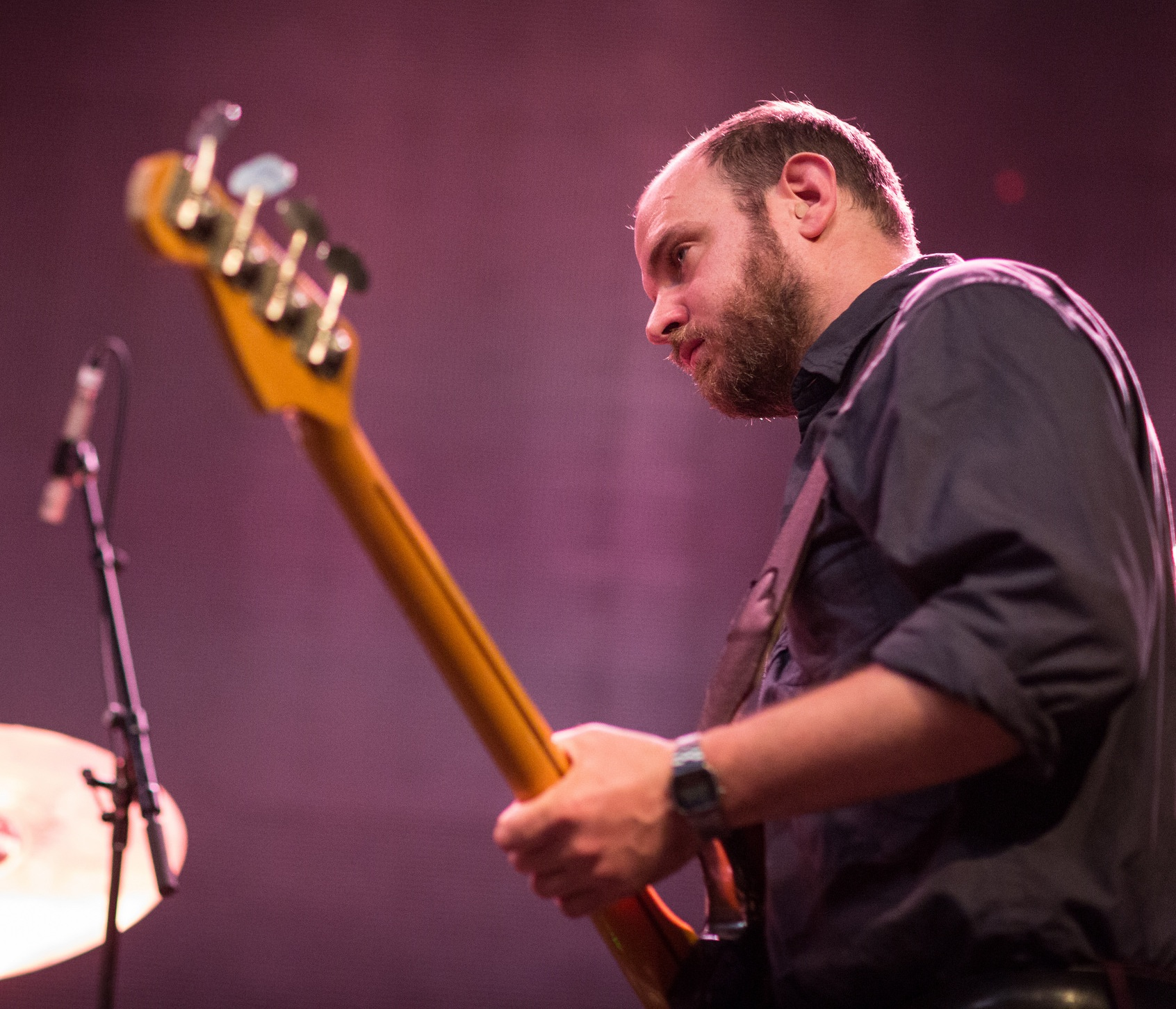
Christopher Pravdica

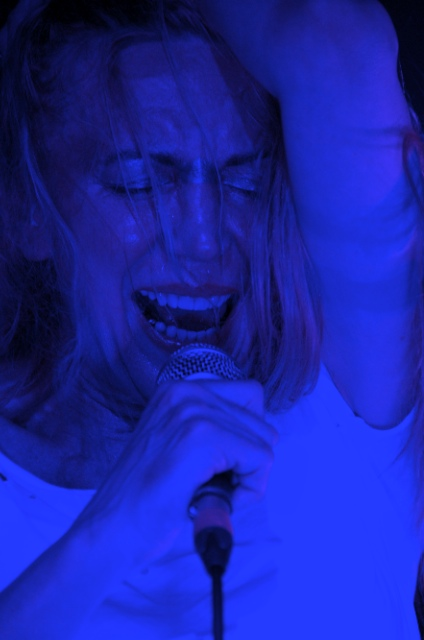
Jarboe

=== Former ===
- Jonathan Kane – drums (1981–1983)
- Daniel Galli-Duani – saxophone (1981–1982)
- Bob Pezzola – guitar (1981–1983)
- Sue Hanel – guitar (1982)
- Thurston Moore – bass (1982)
- Dan Braun – bass (1982)
- Jon Tessler – bass, percussion, tape loops (1982)
- Mojo – percussion, tape loops (1982)
- Roli Mosimann – drums (1982–1984; died 2024)
- Harry Crosby – bass (1983–1986; died 2013)
- John Hood – drums (1984)
- Ivan Nahem – drums (1984–1985)
- Jarboe – keyboards, vocals (1985–1997, 2012, one-off show in 2016)
- Ronaldo Gonzalez – drums (1985–1987)
- Ted Parsons – drums (1985–1987, 1991, 1993–1994)
- Algis Kizys – bass (1985–1988, 1991–1995)
- Jason Asnes – bass (1988)
- Virgil Moorefield – drums (1988)
- Steve McCalister – bass (1989)
- Vinnie Signorelli – drums, percussion (1989–1992)
- Clint Steele – guitar (1990–1995, 1997)
- Jenny Wade – bass (1990–1991)
- Anton Fier – drums (1990–1991; died 2022)
- Bill Rieflin – drums, additional instruments (1994–1996, guest appearances 2010–2017; died 2020)
- Joe Goldring – bass (1995–1996)
- Vudi – guitar, keyboards (1995–1996)
- Bill Bronson – bass (1997)
- Thor Harris – drums, percussion, keyboards (2010–2016, 2017, 2019)
- Paul Wallfisch – keyboards (2016–2017, 2019)
- Yoyo Röhm – bass, double bass, keyboards, vocals (2019)
- Ben Frost – keyboards, guitar (2020–2023, guest appearances since 2012)

== Discography ==
Studio albums

- Filth (1983)
- Cop (1984)
- Greed (1986)
- Holy Money (1986)
- Children of God (1987)
- The Burning World (1989)
- White Light from the Mouth of Infinity (1991)
- Love of Life (1992)
- The Great Annihilator (1995)
- Soundtracks for the Blind (1996)
- My Father Will Guide Me up a Rope to the Sky (2010)
- The Seer (2012)
- To Be Kind (2014)
- The Glowing Man (2016)
- Leaving Meaning (2019)
- The Beggar (2023)
- Birthing (2025)
