= I Am Not Insane =

2010 album

Demo album by Michael Gira
- Released: January 20, 2010
- Length: 50:37
- Label: Young God Records

Michael Gira chronology
Songs for a Dog (2006)	I Am Not Insane (2010)	I Am Not This (2016)

I Am Not Insane is a 2010 album by Michael Gira. The release consists of a CD with new material, and a DVD of two live shows that includes a 16-minute "mini-doc" (by the same name) on Gira's new material in acoustic demo form, shot and edited by Francisco Macias. Several songs were considered, and eventually revised, for inclusion on Swans' comeback album, My Father Will Guide Me Up a Rope to the Sky. Gira released this album in order to help raise money to fund the recording of the upcoming Swans album, following his announcement that he had reformed the band.

The song "Oxygen" appeared in a very different form two studio albums later on the album To Be Kind. The version of "Oxygen" on I Am Not Insane also featured on the 2014 EP. The songs "My Lazy Clown" and "Opium Song" were not included on any future albums, nor played live by Swans.

== Track listing ==
=== Compact disc ===
1. "Jim " – 4:26
2. "No Words/No Thoughts" – 4:48
3. "Reeling the Liars In" – 2:20
4. "My Birth" – 3:03
5. "Little Mouth" – 5:20
6. "Eden Prison (That Way)" – 3:48
7. "Eden Prison (This Way)" – 4:22
8. "My Lazy Clown" – 2:54
9. "Opium Song" – 2:48
10. "Inside Madeline" – 3:46
11. "Oxygen" – 4:27
12. "Promise of Water" – 3:25
13. "Failure" – 5:00

=== DVD ===
Highline Ballroom Show, New York

1. "I Am the Sun"
2. "Promise of Water"
3. "Nations"
4. "Failure"
5. "Lena's Song"
6. "My Brother's Man"
7. "Destroyer"
8. "She Lives!"
9. "My Sister Said"
10. "Sometimes I Dream I'm Hurting You"
11. "Rose of Los Angeles"

Drake Underground Show, Toronto

1. "Little Mouth"
2. "On the Mountain (Looking Down)"
3. "Promise of Water"
4. "Reeling the Liars In"
5. "My Brother's Man"
6. "The Surrogate"
7. "Destroyer"
8. "Oxygen"
9. "Inside Madeline"
10. "Eden Prison"
11. "Sometimes I Dream I'm Hurting You"
