= To Be Kind =

2014 Swans album

- Standard cover art for the album; digital editions of the album feature the same baby's face, slightly enlarged, in the middle of a white background

Studio album by Swans
- Released: May 12, 2014
- Recorded: October-December 2013
- Studios: Sonic Ranch (Tornillo, Texas)
- Genres: Experimental rock; noise rock; drone; art rock
- Length: 121:12
- Language: English
- Labels: Young God; Mute
- Producer: Michael Gira

Swans chronology
Not Here / Not Now (2013)	To Be Kind (2014)	Oxygen (2014)

Singles from To Be Kind
- 1. "A Little God In My Hands" Released: March 21, 2014; 2. "Oxygen" Released: November 24, 2014; 3. "Screen Shot" Released: 2015

To Be Kind is the thirteenth studio album by American experimental rock band Swans, released on May 12, 2014. A double album, it was recorded by producer John Congleton in Texas.

The songs were developed during the band's 2012 and 2013 tours. The deluxe edition includes a live DVD of the band's performance at the 2013 Primavera Sound festival in Barcelona.

The album received widespread critical acclaim, continuing a string of well-received albums from the band. The album peaked at number 37 on US Billboard 200, and debuted at number 38 on the UK Albums Chart. Both are the highest chartings that Swans had ever achieved on a studio album and it is the first time that the band cracked the top 40 in both countries.

== Background ==
To Be Kind was produced by frontman Michael Gira and recorded by John Congleton at Sonic Ranch and at Congleton's studio in Dallas. Rehearsing commenced at Sonic Ranch in October 2013 and recording began soon after. Mixing was completed with Congleton in December in Dallas. Most of the music was developed while touring in 2012 and 2013. The album features special guests St. Vincent, Cold Specks, Little Annie and Bill Rieflin. On March 21, the song "A Little God in My Hands" as well as the album artwork were revealed. Six images of babies' heads, created by Bob Biggs c. 1976, were used for the album art.

== Critical reception ==
Professional ratings
Aggregate scores
Source	Rating
AnyDecentMusic?	8.6/10
Metacritic	88/100
Review scores
Source	Rating
AllMusic	4/5 stars
The A.V. Club	A−
The Guardian	3/5 stars
Los Angeles Times	4/4 stars
Mojo	4/5 stars
NME	9/10
Pitchfork	9.2/10
Q	4/5 stars
Rolling Stone	3.5/5 stars
Spin	9/10

To Be Kind was met with widespread critical acclaim. At Metacritic, which assigns a normalized rating out of 100 to reviews from critics, the album received an average score of 88, based on 35 reviews, indicating "universal acclaim". Mark Deming of AllMusic gave the album a positive review, stating:,"Michael Gira is a man unafraid to follow his muse wherever it may take him and To Be Kind is another example of his singular vision writ large without compromise." Anna Wilson of Clash praised the album, describing it as "Karlheinz Stockhausen's jarring classicism, Captain Beefheart's twisted blues, and the industrialism of Einstürzende Neubauten coalescing into a swirling musical miasma." She also stated that the album is "near perfection." Benjamin Bland of Drowned in Sound gave the album a 10/10 score and stated, "This is an album that emphasises rather than establishes Swans' reconfirmed position at the top of the experimental rock tree, but that doesn't make it any less of a thrill." He further commented, "Now that this mission has been completed there is space for To Be Kind, and future Swans records to affirm, rather than prove, that Swans are, and perhaps always have been, the greatest rock group on the face of the planet." Writing for Rolling Stone, Kory Grow compared the album to The Seer, as well as the 1996 effort Soundtracks for the Blind, noting how "Swans' sound has evolved so that they "don't just crush—they hypnotize".

Ross Horton of musicOMH gave the album a 5-star score, commenting, "Gira shows that the Swans resurgence isn't a fluke." Stuart Berman of Pitchfork praised Gira's efforts on the album, stating, "He's responded in the best way possible: by producing a record that, in structure and scale, is every bit The Seer's equal, yet possessed by a peculiar energy and spirit that proves all the more alluring in its dark majesty." Rory Gibb of The Quietus wrote, "By this point they've further coalesced into an inseparable entity. On To Be Kind we experience Swans as totality, all seething ebb and flow crafting music that seems to breathe of its own volition." He also stated that the album's songs "feel more fluid and open-ended than before, expressive and rich in possibility." Colm McAuliffe of The Skinny also gave the album a positive review, stating, "Despite the two-hour plus running time, Swans appear to be – gasp! – enjoying themselves; they're still staring into the abyss but the abyss is no longer staring back." He also noted that the album: "displays much more diversity than its immediate predecessors." Louis Pattison of Uncut wrote, "Yet as the name suggests To Be Kind does feature a quality hitherto rare in Swans: that of tenderness." He also further stated, "Michael Gira is not only still moving forward but making some of the finest albums of his career."

To Be Kind received a "perfect 10" from Anthony Fantano of The Needle Drop.

While the album's reception was overwhelmingly positive, some reviews were more mixed. Jon Dennis of The Guardian described the album as "uncompromising to the point of overindulgence" and felt that the lengthy track "Bring the Sun / Toussaint L'Ouverture" was "like The Doors playing "The End" for ever, only without the easygoing bonhomie."

== Track listing ==
All lyrics are written by Michael Gira.

Disc one
No.	Title	Music	Length
1.	"Screen Shot"	Michael Gira	8:04
2.	"Just a Little Boy (For Chester Burnett)"	Gira; Christoph Hahn; Thor Harris; Christopher Pravdica; Phil Puleo; Norman Westberg	12:39
3.	"A Little God in My Hands"	Gira	7:08
4.	"Bring the Sun / Toussaint L'Ouverture"	Gira; Hahn; Harris; Pravdica; Puleo; Westberg	34:05
5.	"Some Things We Do"	Gira	5:09
Total length:			67:05

Disc two
No.	Title	Music	Length
1.	"She Loves Us"	Gira; Hahn; Harris; Pravdica; Puleo; Westberg	17:00
2.	"Kirsten Supine"	Gira	10:32
3.	"Oxygen"	Gira	7:58
4.	"Nathalie Neal"	Gira	10:14
5.	"To Be Kind"	Gira; Hahn; Harris; Pravdica; Puleo; Westberg	8:23
Total length:			54:07

Vinyl version (Side one)
No.	Title	Length
1.	"Screen Shot"	8:07
2.	"Just a Little Boy (For Chester Burnett)"	12:20

Vinyl version (Side two)
No.	Title	Length
1.	"A Little God in My Hands"	6:35
2.	"Bring the Sun / Toussaint L'Ouverture Part One"	14:41

Vinyl version (Side three)
No.	Title	Length
1.	"Bring the Sun / Toussaint L'Ouverture Part Two"	19:32

Vinyl version (Side four)
No.	Title	Length
1.	"Some Things We Do"	5:09
2.	"She Loves Us"	15:04

Vinyl version (Side five)
No.	Title	Length
1.	"Kirsten Supine"	10:33
2.	"Oxygen"	7:59

Vinyl version (Side six)
No.	Title	Length
1.	"Nathalie Neal"	10:15
2.	"To Be Kind"	8:23

- The European vinyl version was pressed incorrectly, leading "Oxygen" to be placed on side 5 before "Kirsten Supine" on the record, despite the packaging listing them in the correct order.

2CD+DVD Edition bonus videos (Live at Primavera 2013)
No.	Title	Music	Length
1.	"To Be Kind"	Gira; Hahn; Harris; Pravdica; Puleo; Westberg	20:41
2.	"Just a Little Boy (For Chester Burnett)"	Gira; Hahn; Harris; Pravdica; Puleo; Westberg	10:46
3.	"Coward"	Gira; Harry Crosby; Ronaldo Gonzalez; Jarboe; Ivan Nahem; Ted Parsons; Westberg	8:36
4.	"She Loves Us"	Gira; Hahn; Harris; Pravdica; Puleo; Westberg	18:17
5.	"Oxygen"	Gira	7:17
6.	"The Seer / Toussaint L'Ouverture"	Gira; Hahn; Harris; Pravdica; Puleo; Westberg	45:35
Total length:			111:10

== Personnel ==
Adapted from the official Young God Records website:

Swans

- Michael Gira – vocals, electric and acoustic guitar, production
- Christoph Hahn – lap steel guitars, electric guitar, vocals
- Thor Harris – drums, percussion, vibes and bells, wind instruments, handmade viola, vocals
- Christopher Pravdica – bass guitar, acoustic guitar, vocals
- Phil Puleo – drums, percussion, dulcimer, piano, keyboards, vocals
- Norman Westberg – electric guitar, acoustic guitar, vocals
- Bill Rieflin – drums and percussion, synthesizer, piano, electric guitar, bass guitar, keyboards (credited as 'Honorary Swan Forever' and 'on multiple songs throughout the record')

Guest musicians

- Little Annie – vocal duet with MG on "Some Things We Do"
- Julia Kent – strings and string arrangement on "Some Things We Do"
- St. Vincent – background vocals on "Nathalie Neal", "Bring the Sun", "Screen Shot", and "Kirsten Supine"
- Cold Specks – background vocals on "Bring the Sun"
- Jennifer Church – background vocals on "She Loves Us" and "A Little God in My Hands"

More musicians

- Daniel Hart – violin
- Rex Emerson – mandolin
- David Pierce – trombone
- Evan Weiss – trumpet
- Sean Kirkpatrick – piano, harpsichord, synthesizer
- John Congleton – piano

Technical

- John Congleton – recording, mixing
- Doug Henderson – mastering
- Bob Biggs – artwork

== Charts ==
Chart (2014)	Peak position
Austrian Albums (Ö3 Austria)	51
Belgian Albums (Ultratop Flanders)	39
Belgian Albums (Ultratop Wallonia)	106
Dutch Albums (Album Top 100)	75
German Albums (Offizielle Top 100)	56
UK Albums (Official Charts)	38
US Billboard 200	37
US Independent Albums (Billboard)	5
US Top Alternative Albums (Billboard)	7
US Top Rock Albums (Billboard)	10

== Release history ==
Region	Date	Format	Label
Worldwide (except North America)	May 12, 2014	2CD, 2CD+DVD, 3LP, digital download	Mute Records
North America	May 13, 2014	2CD, 2CD+DVD, 3LP, digital download	Young God Records
