= Bee and Flower =

American band

Bee and Flower is a band founded in New York City in 1999 by singer-songwriter, bassist, animator, illustrator, composer and producer Dana Schechter. Schechter formed the band while also a member of Michael Gira's band Angels of Light.

Bee and Flower's co-founding band members include Ani Cordero on drums and backing vocals, Roderick Miller (Richard Ruin, Kitty Solaris) on piano and keyboards, Jon Petrow (Cordero, And the Wiremen) on viola and violin, and Lynn Wright (James Hall, And the Wiremen) on guitar. They recorded their first demo in 1999 with Sam McCall. Later members include Ethan Donaldson (And the Wiremen) on drums, Joni Heine (The Ocean) on bass, and Thomas Fietz (Richard Ruin) on drums. Touring members included Jeff Conaway (The Psychic Paramount) and Rainer Baumgartner (The Durgas) on drums, Thimo Sander (Poems for Laila) on guitar, Martin Wenk (Calexico) on percussion, guitar and trumpet, and Simon Goff (Aidan Baker) on violin.

== History ==
In 2001, the band supplied the track Twin Stars for the compilation This Is Next Year: A Brooklyn-Based Compilation released by Arena Rock Recording Co.

Their album What's Mine Is Yours was released in 2003. AllMusic awarded it 4/5, praising Schechter's "sexy yet sophisticated performance" and attention-grabbing voice.

Bee and Flower collaboratively wrote the original score for the feature film A Good Night to Die (2003); Dana Schechter had previously scored Singer's film Dead Dogs Lie (2001). Both films were directed by Craig Singer.

A music video for "I Know Your Name", directed by Josh Graham (Neurosis, Storm Of Light) was released on Neurot's "Various Artists 1 DVD" in 2004.

In 2004 the band, then consisting of just Dana Schechter and Roderick Miller, went to Berlin with producer Toby Dammit (Iggy Pop and Swans) to record an album. Schechter and Miller then settled in Berlin, making it the new base for the band.

Last Sight of Land, recorded in 2004 in Berlin and released on tuition music in 2007, explores elements of traditional film scoring orchestration, with an emphasis on strings, choirs, and a large bass section. This album marked the departure of the core band from New York City to Berlin between 2004 and 2008. Bee and Flower have worked since this album with a number of musicians, both in the studio and in live performances, who play in notable bands, including Thomas Wydler (Nick Cave and the Bad Seeds) and Peter von Poehl (Bertrand Burgalat).

The Bridge (2009, Lakeshore Records), a compilation track for the official soundtrack for documentary film Scott Walker 30 Century Man, was recorded in Berlin and NYC. Schechter met film director Stephen Kijak after working as an animator on the film, and was later invited to contribute a track. The album also features contributors Damon & Naomi, Laurie Anderson, Saint Etienne, Jarboe, and more.

The band's last studio album to date, Suspension, was recorded by Ingo Krauss at Candy Bomber Studios in Berlin and released in 2012. In addition to some past guest musicians such as Martin Wenk, the LP includes trumpet playing from Paul Watson (Sparklehorse).

In 2021, Schechter stated that she was uncertain of the band's future, but would not confirm that the band has been dissolved:

I don’t think B&F [Bee and Flower] will come back. It existed for 12-plus years and that was enough for it to run whatever course it could run. Despite the fact that (in my opinion) those records are really great, it wasn’t a successful band and running it took a lot of my blood, sweat and heartache, so I was ready to let it go by the end. However, we are all still friends and fans of each other’s current projects.

As of 2022, Schechter is based in Berlin.

== Releases ==
- 2001 – Dead Dogs Lie, Original Film Score
- 2003 – A Good Night to Die, Original Film Score
- 2003 – D.I.Y. Or Die Independent Film / Interview
- 2003 – What's Mine Is Yours, CD (Neurot)
- 2004 – Various Artists 1, DVD Music Video (Neurot)
- 2006 – What's Mine Is Yours, CD/Russia (Soyuz)
- 2007 – Last Sight of Land, CD (tuition)
- 2007 – Dust & Sparks, 7" (Morningrise)
- 2009 – "The Bridge" – Scott Walker 30 Century Man CD Compilation (Lakeshore)
- 2011 – Split EP w/ Keiki, 10" (Cheap Satanism Records)
- 2012 – Suspension (Cheap Satanism Records)
