= Kristof Hahn =

Kristof (Christoph) Hahn
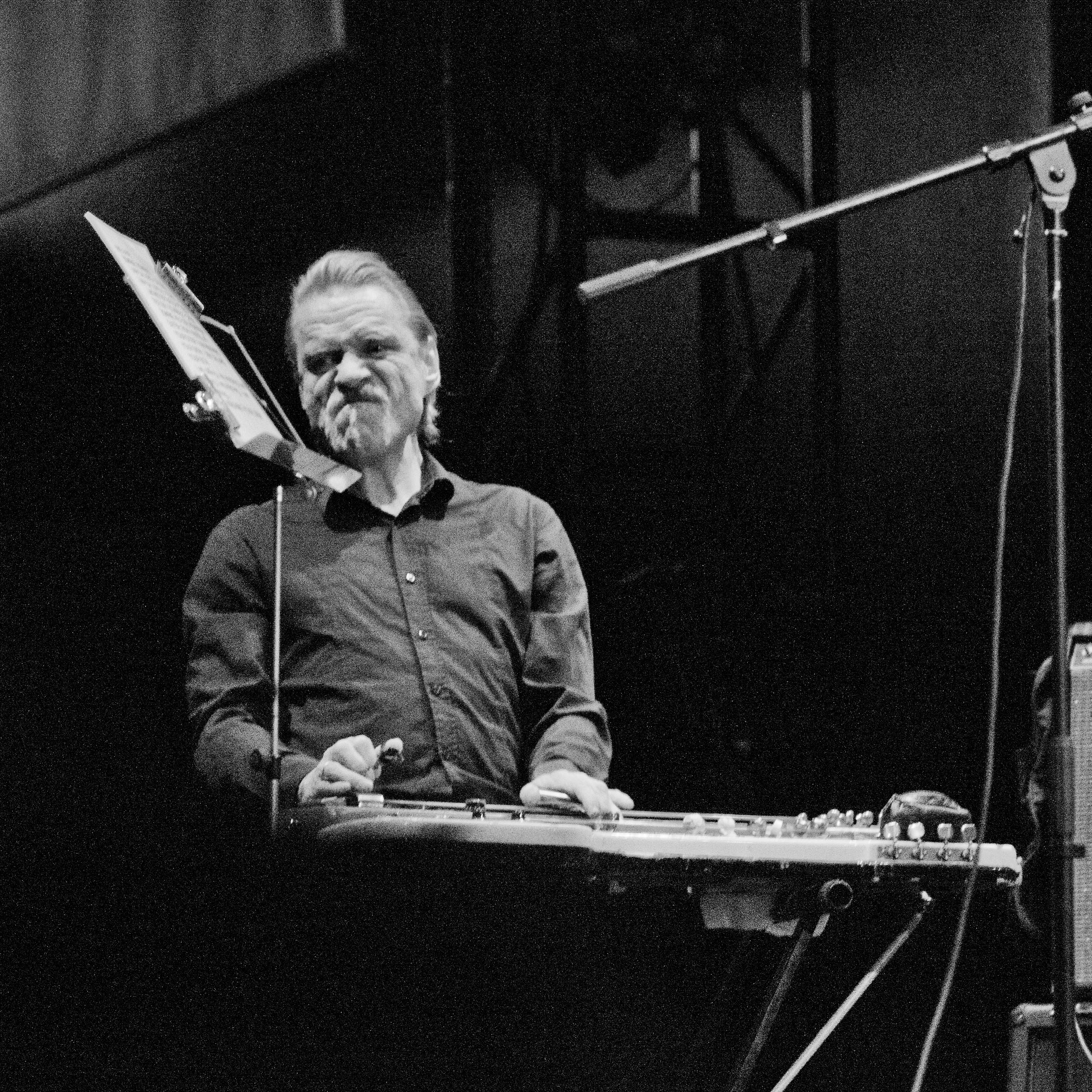
- Kristof Hahn in 2017

Background information
- Born: 6 February 1959 (age 67); Idar-Oberstein, Germany
- Genres: Industrial; ambient; experimental rock; art rock
- Occupations: Musician, songwriter, composer, translator
- Instrument: Guitar
- Years active: 1980–present
- Labels: Young God; Cherry Red; Exile; Disques Sauvages

Kristof Hahn (also known as Christoph Hahn; born 6 February 1959) is a German guitarist, composer and translator.

Hahn is best known for his lap steel guitar playing in the New York experimental rock band Swans. He joined the band in 1989 to tour in support of the Burning World album tour and played on the subsequent album White Light from the Mouth of Infinity. He left the band in 1992 due to the birth of his first child, and joined Swans' bandleader Michael Gira's follow-up project Angels of Light. Hahn was a constant member of the Swans relaunch from 2010 until 2017, and again in 2023.

His approach to the lap-steel guitar is non-traditional, often devoted to playing drones that can serve as either supporting background elements or take a more prominent role in the band's music.

== Biography ==
Kristof Hahn grew up in Saarbrücken in southwest Germany. He studied classical guitar as a youth, then turned to electric guitar. His style is influenced by a diversity of artists ranging from Ike Turner, Dick Dale and Chris Spedding to Glenn Branca.

In 1980 moved to West-Berlin and joined several musical projects. Among those were The Legendary Golden Vampires and The Nirvana Devils, both rockabilly influenced garage-rock groups that emerged from the post-punk movement.

He also recorded two solo EPs under the name Justice Hahn and an album with the American musician/producer Alex Chilton under the name Koolkings in 1990. In the late 1990s he rejoined forces with long time friend and collaborator Thomas Wydler (Nick Cave and the Bad Seeds) who had already played drums on his 1988 EP Down by Love, and together with singer Viola Limpet they formed the rock'n'roll-noir ensemble Les Hommes Sauvages. They released three albums – Playtime (2000), Trafic (2004) and Vive la Trance (2011). Due to the extended activities with the re-activated SWANS this band ceased its existence in 2012. He has continued a sporadic collaboration with Wydler on the latter's solo albums Morphosa Harmonia, Soul Sheriff, and On the Mat and off – The Lion of Scandavinia.

In 2017 Hahn became a member of the avant-garage band Pere Ubu after contributing to their album 20 Years in a Montana Missile Silo. He has also released an instrumental solo album called Solo Etudes on the American label Erototox. His current band in Berlin - once again a rock'n'roll noir ensemble that includes a classical bassoon player - is called Sultans of Gedankenbrain.

Besides his band activities Hahn has recorded movie soundtracks for German director Robert Schwentke (Eierdiebe/The Family Jewels - 2003) and Austrian film-maker Marko Doringer (Mein Halbes Leben – 2008, Naegel mit Köpfen – 2013).

== Personal life ==
Kristof Hahn has been married to Tatiana Hahn. She appeared as a "host" on 2019 Swans album Leaving Meaning.

== Translation ==
Hahn has worked extensively as a translator of English-language books into the German language. He has translated books by, among others, Christopher Moore, Richard Laymon and Simon Kernick. Additional translated works include The Song of the Silent Snow by Hubert Selby Jr., Margrave of the Marshes, by John Peel, and Thy Neighbor's Wife by Gay Talese

== Discography ==
- Die Goldenen Vampire – Hinter der grünen Tür (LP - 1981)
- The Legendary Golden Vampires – "Gone for Good" (7" 1984)
- The Legendary Golden Vampires – "Creeping Poison" (7" 1985)
- The Nirvana Devils – "Some Foreign Shore" (7" 1984)
- The Nirvana Devils – "Secret Agent Girl" (7" 1985)
- The Nirvana Devils – "Twisted Tales" (10" 1986)
- Justice Hahn – "Down by Love" (10" 1988)
- Justice Hahn – "Ragged but Right" (10" 1991)
- Koolkings – Shocked and Amazed (LP 1991)
- Swans – White Light from the Mouth of Infinity (LP 1991)
- Angels of Light – New Mother (LP 1999)
- Les Hommes Sauvages – Playtime (LP 2000)
- Angels of Light – How I loved You (LP 2001)
- Angels of Light – Everything Is Good Here/Please Come Home (LP 2003)
- Les Hommes Sauvages – Trafic (LP 2004)
- Thomas Wydler/Toby Dammit – Morphosa Harmonia (LP 2004)
- Thomas Wydler – Soul Sheriff (LP 2007)
- Swans – My Father Will Guide Me up a Rope to the Sky (LP 2010)
- Les Hommes Sauvages – Vive la Trance (LP 2011)
- Thomas Wydler – On the Mat and Off (2011)
- Swans – The Seer (LP 2012)
- Swans – To Be Kind (LP 2014)
- Swans – The Glowing Man (LP 2016)
- Xiu Xiu – Forget (LP 2017)
- Pere Ubu – 20 Years in a Montana Missile Silo (LP 2017)
- Swans – Leaving Meaning (LP 2019)
- Tricky – Fall to Pieces (LP 2020)
- Sometimes With Others – Nous (LP 2020)
- Kristof Hahn – Six Pieces (LP 2021)
- Swans – The Beggar (LP 2023)
- Swans – Birthing (LP 2025)
