= Young God Records =

American record label

- Founded: 1990
- Founder: Michael Gira
- Genre: Experimental rock, avant-garde, ambient, folk
- Country of origin: U.S.
- Location: New York City
- Official website: younggodrecords.com

Young God Records is an independent record label formed by Michael Gira in 1990 that specializes in experimental, avant-garde and often non genre-specific releases. The label was named after an EP released by Gira's band Swans called Young God.

The label's original intent was to facilitate the release of Swans' music, but while the band was disbanded Young God grew to host the Angels of Light as well as a number of other unique bands and artists, including: Akron/Family, Devendra Banhart, Lisa Germano, Ulan Bator, and Mi and L'au. Swans was re-formed in 2010, and began again releasing music under the Young God label. In 2012, Gira told Pitchfork that Young God would not be putting out any new albums by other bands, citing the decline in revenue.

== List of artists ==
- Akron/Family
- The Angels of Light
- Devendra Banhart
- James Blackshaw
- The Body Lovers / The Body Haters
- Calla
- David Coulter
- Fire on Fire
- Flux Information Sciences
- Larkin Grimm
- Lisa Germano
- Mi and L'au
- Larsen
- Charlemagne Palestine / David Coulter / Jean Marie Mathoul
- Swans
- Ulan Bator
- Windsor for the Derby
- Wooden Wand

== See also ==
- List of record labels
