= Jarboe discography =

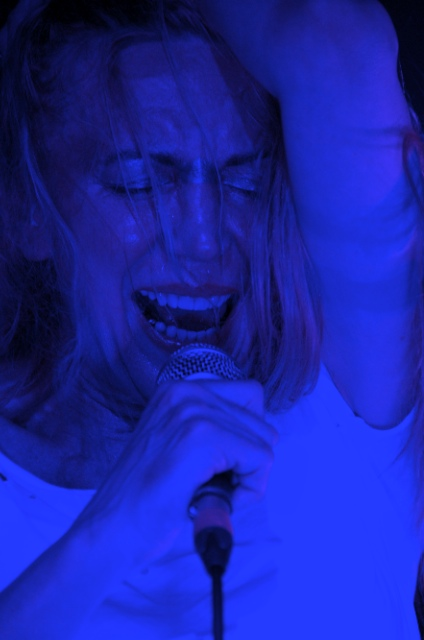
- Studio albums: 17
- Soundtrack albums: 1
- Compilation albums: 1
- Remix albums: 1

This article presents the complete discography of American singer-songwriter Jarboe. It covers her work in bands such as Swans, Skin and Blackmouth as well as her solo recording output.

== As a Solo artist ==
=== Studio albums ===
Title	Album details
Thirteen Masks	Released: January 30, 1991; Label: Sky/Hyperium; Formats: CD, CS, LP
Sacrificial Cake	Released: June 9, 1995; Label: Alternative Tentacles; Formats: CD
Anhedoniac	Released: July 20, 1998; Formats: CD
Disburden Disciple	Released: April 17, 2000; Formats: CD
The Men Album	Released: October 17, 2005; Label: Atavistic; Formats: CD
The Conduit	Released: November 14, 2005; Label: Atavistic; Formats: CD
Mahakali	Released: October 14, 2008; Label: The End; Formats: CD
Alchemic	Released: March 20, 2009; Label: Twilight; Formats: CD
Indemnity	Released: December 5, 2011; Label: Burning World; Formats: CD
The Sweet Meat Love and Holy Cult	Released: January 29, 2013; Label: Atavistic; Formats: CD
Wabi Sabi	Released: March 25, 2015; Label: The Living Jarboe; Formats: CDR, Digital
Zen J Jazz	Released: April 1, 2015; Label: The Living Jarboe; Formats: CDR, Digital
As Mind Dissolves as Song Begins	Released: April 3, 2017; Label: The Living Jarboe; Formats: CDR, Digital
The Cut of the Warrior	Released: December 14, 2018; Label: Translation Loss, The Living Jarboe; Formats: CD, Vinyl, Digital
Illusory	Released: April 16, 2020; Label: Consouling Sounds, The Living Jarboe; Formats: CD, Vinyl, Digital
A Tulpa	Released: November 13, 2020; Label: The Living Jarboe; Formats: CDR, Digital
Procession	Released: February 1, 2023; Label: The Living Jarboe; Formats: Digital
Sightings	Released: April 3, 2026; Label: Consouling Sounds, The Living Jarboe; Formats: CD, Vinyl, Digital

=== Collaborative albums ===
Released		Title	
Year	Month	Title	
1993		Beautiful People Ltd	With Lary Seven
2003	Oct	Neurosis & Jarboe	With Neurosis
2005		Knight of Swords / The Beggar	With Nic Le Ban
2006		The End	With Cedric Victor
2007	Oct	Viscera	With Byla
2008		Dark Consort	With Cedric Victor
2008	Mar	J²	With Justin Broadrick
2015	Mar	Jarboe & Helen Money	With Helen Money
2023	June	The Embrace	with Kris Force

=== Remix albums ===
Released		Title
Year	Month	Title
2002		Dissected

=== Extended plays ===
Released		Title
Year	Month	Title
2000		Over
2006		Magick for Mischiefs
2007		Magick for Prudence
2007		Magick for Cherishings

=== Compilation albums ===
Released		Title
Year	Month	Title
1987		Nine//Underground (Side Two, Track One, "Walls")
2005	Jan	A Mystery of Faith – Unreleased Pieces: Swans + World of Skin

=== Soundtrack albums ===
Year	Title	Notes
2010	The Path	Official soundtrack to the video game, The Path

== As a band member ==
=== With Swans ===
Title	Album details
Time Is Money (Bastard)	Released: 1986; Label: K.422; Formats: 12-Inch Single
Greed	Released: 1986; Label: K.422; Formats: CS, LP
A Screw	Released: 1986; Label: K.422; Formats: 12-Inch Single
Holy Money	Released: 1986; Label: K.422; Formats: CS, LP
Children of God	Released: October 19, 1987; Label: Caroline; Formats: CD, CS, LP
The Burning World	Released: 1989; Label: UNI; Formats: CD, CS, LP
White Light from the Mouth of Infinity	Released: June 5, 1991; Label: Young God; Formats: CD, CS, LP
Love of Life	Released: February 24, 1992; Label: Young God; Formats: CD, CS, LP
The Great Annihilator	Released: January 23, 1995; Label: Young God; Formats: CD, CS, LP
Soundtracks for the Blind	Released: October 22, 1996; Label: Young God; Formats: CD

=== With Skin ===
Title	Album details
Blood, Women, Roses	Released: 1987; Label: Product Inc.; Formats: CD, LP
Shame, Humility, Revenge	Released: 1988; Label: Product Inc.; Formats: CD, LP
Ten Songs for Another World	Released: 1990; Label: Young God; Formats: CD, CS, LP

=== With Blackmouth ===
Title	Album details
Blackmouth	Released: May 2000; Label: Crowd Control Activities; Formats: CD
Blackmouth, Volumes I and II	Released: 2020; Formats: CD; 25-track album featuring 11 new songs and the entirety of the previous album

=== With AEAEA ===
Title	Album details
Drink the New Wine	Released: February 14, 2014; Label: Twilight Records; Formats: CD

== Credits ==
Year	Artist	Release	Role(s)	Song(s)
1995	Michael Gira	Drainland	Organ, backing vocals	"Blind"
1995	Michael Gira	Drainland	Producer, musical arrangements	—
1996	PBK	Life-Sense Revoked	Vocals, harpsichord	"Beauty's Punishment"
1996	PBK	Life-Sense Revoked	Vocals, instruments	"Courage Collage"
1997	PBK	Headmix	Vocals	"World's Disappeared" (remix)
1998	Backworld	Isles of the Blest	Vocals	"Beautiful Dream"
1998	The Body Lovers	Number One of Three	Vocals	—
1998	C17H19NO3	1692 / 2092	Vocals	"The Room of Ice", "Electric Air"
1998	Ignis Fatuus	The Futility Goddess	Vocals	"Communion", "Cache Toi", "Encomium"
1999	Backworld	Anthems From the Pleasure Park	Vocals	"The Naked Soul"
1999	Thread	In Sweet Sorrow (EP)	Vocals	"In Sweet Sorrow"
2000	Steven Severin	The Woman in the Dunes	Vocals	"I Put a Spell on You"
2000	Thread	Abnormal Love	Vocals	"In Sweet Sorrow", "Contours"
2001	Neotropic	La prochaine fois	Vocals	"Cornershop Candy"
2002	Karma	God Is Mine	Vocals, piano, synthesizer	"Trance", "Recover"
2002	Oxbow	An Evil Heat	Vocals	"S Bar X"
2003	A Perfect Circle	Thirteenth Step	Vocals	"The Noose", "Lullaby"
2004	Kirlian Camera	Invisible Front. 2005	recording	"Kobna Dob (The Sinister Season)"
2004	Kirlian Camera	Invisible Front. 2005	Vocals, electronics	"A Woman's Dreams"
2004	Meridiem	A Pleasant Fiction	Vocals	"Carlotta"
2004	Rivulets / Marc Gartman	Rivulets / Marc Gartman	Vocals	"Cutter II"
2006	Monica Richards	InfraWarrior	Vocals	"Sedna"
2006	Lustmord	Rising	Vocals	"Lust"
2006	Larsen	SeieS	Vocals	—
2008	Cobalt	Eater of Birds	Backing vocals	—
2008	Jesu	Lifeline	Vocals, recording	"Storm Comin' On"
2008	Puscifer	"V" Is for Vagina	Backing vocals (sampled)	"Trekka"
2008	Guapo	Elixirs	Vocals	"Twisted Stems: The Selenotrope"
2008	Love Is Nothing.	Chapter IV	Vocals	"Hungry Ghost"
2009	Cattle Decapitation	The Harvest Floor	Vocals	"The Harvest Floor", "Regret & The Grave"
2009	Cobalt	Gin	Backing vocals	—
2009	A Storm of Light	Forgive Us Our Trespasses	Vocals	"The Light in their Eyes", "Across the Wilderness"
2010	The Austrasian Goat	Stains of Resignation	Vocals	"Voice of Aenima"
2011	A Storm of Light	As the Valley of Death Becomes Us, Our Silver Memories Fade	Vocals	"Collapse", "Death's Head"
2011	Morne	Asylum	Vocals	"Volition"
2011	Strange Attractor	Anatomy of a Tear	Vocals	"Otherworld"
2011	Sada	Hauntology	Vocals	"The Eucharist"
2012	Asva & Philippe Petit	Empires Should Burn...	Vocals	"The Star Implodes"
2012	Naer Mataron	Ζήτω Ο Θάνατος	Vocals	"Ζήτω Ο Θάνατος"
2012	Sky Burial	There I Saw the Grey Wolf Gaping	Instruments	"Incantare", "There I Saw the Grey Wolf Gaping"
2012	Swans	The Seer	Backing vocals	"The Seer Returns", "A Piece of the Sky"
2013	Swans	The Seer	Voice collage	"A Piece of the Sky"
2013	Lustmord	The Word as Power	Vocals	"Andras Sodom"
2013	Voids	Burial in the Sky	Keyboards	"Desert Dawn"
2013	In Solitude	Sister	Backing vocals	"Horses in the Ground"
2013	Meridiem	A Scattering Time	Vocals	"Carlotta", "River of Fire"
2013	Brigand	Zaplešimo Grešnici	Vocals, keyboards	"Tri Noći"
2013	Man's Gin	Rebellion Hymns	Vocals	"Sirens"
2014	Crone	Gehenna	Backing vocals	"Dead Man"
