= A Mystery of Faith — Unreleased Pieces: Swans + World of Skin =

Compilation album by Jarboe
- Released: January 25, 2005
- Recorded: 1986 – 1997
- Length: 144:56
- Label: Atavistic
- Producer: Michael Gira, Jarboe, Lary Seven

Jarboe chronology
Neurosis & Jarboe (2003)	A Mystery of Faith — Unreleased Pieces: Swans + World of Skin (2005)	The Men Album (2005)

Professional ratings
Review scores
Source	Rating
PopMatters	(6/10)

A Mystery of Faith — Unreleased Pieces: Swans + World of Skin is a compilation album by Jarboe, released on January 25, 2005 by Atavistic Records.

== Track listing ==
Disc one
No.	Title	Writer(s)	Originally released on	Length
1.	"Beauty's Punishment"	Jarboe	previously unreleased	2:33
2.	"Blackmail" (live)	Swans	Feel Good Now (1988)	4:48
3.	"Girl Come Out"	Skin	Blood, Women, Roses	4:46
4.	"Dream Dream" (Original Jarboe demo version)	The World of Skin		5:25
5.	"Everything for Maria" (For Callas)	The World of Skin	Ten Songs for Another World	5:07
6.	"Hypo Girl" (Rehearsal)	Swans		2:10
7.	"I Crawled" (live)	Swans	Swans Are Dead (1998)	11:14
8.	"Mother Father" (live)	Swans	Die Tür ist zu (1996)	3:51
9.	"Mother Father" (live)	Swans	Swans Are Dead (1998)	3:52
10.	"Mothers Milk" (mix)	Swans	The Great Annihilator	2:35
11.	"Still a Child" (live)	Skin		4:45
12.	"A Mystery of Faith"	The World of Skin		3:37
13.	"She Cries"	Swans	Love of Life (1992)	4:55
14.	"Song for Dead Time" (live)	Swans		7:05
15.	"Still a Child" (live)	Skin		5:16

Disc two
No.	Title	Writer(s)	Originally released on	Length
1.	"Black Eyed Dog" (live)	Swans	Omniscience (1992)	3:35
2.	"Can't Find My Way Home" (live)	Swans	They Came, They Played, They Blocked The Driveway (1992)	4:02
3.	"Come Out" (mix)	Skin		3:07
4.	"Come Out" (rap)	Skin		5:39
5.	"Come Out" (dub)	Skin		6:30
6.	"Dream Dream"	The World of Skin		5:36
7.	"Hypo Girl Alive"	Swans	Swans Are Dead (1998)	3:32
8.	"I Put a Spell on You" (live)	Jarboe		3:49
9.	"Searing Sound Check..."	Swans		1:37
10.	"Love Will Tear Us Apart" (live in Manchester)	Swans		4:13
11.	"Mother Father"	Swans	The Great Annihilator	4:29
12.	"Mother's Milk" (live)	Swans	Omniscience	4:37
13.	"Song for a Buried Child" (mix)	Jarboe		3:23
14.	"Song for a Buried Child" (rehearsal)	Jarboe		2:05
15.	"The Man I Love" (live in London)	Skin		3:53
16.	"The Man I Love"	Skin		5:51
17.	"Wayfaring Stranger" (live)	Jarboe		4:05
18.	"Wayfaring Stranger" (A cappella rehearsal)	Jarboe		2:54

== Personnel ==
Adapted from the A Mystery of Faith — Unreleased Pieces: Swans + World of Skin liner notes.

- Chris Griffin – mastering

== Release history ==
Region	Date	Label	Format	Catalog
United States	2005	Atavistic	CD	ALP155
