= Swans Are Dead =

1998 album

Live album (double album) by Swans
- Released: January 20, 1998
- Recorded: August 24, 1995; January 24 & March 13, 1997
- Venue: Paradiso Grote Zaal, Amsterdam, NLD; Irving Plaza, New York City, US
- Length: 142:53
- Language: English
- Label: Young God
- Producer: Michael Gira

Swans chronology
Soundtracks for the Blind (1996)	Swans Are Dead (1998)	Various Failures (1999)

Swans Are Dead is the seventh live album by American experimental rock band Swans. It was released in 1998 and was recorded in 1995 and 1997 on the band's final tours before reuniting in 2010.

Setlists for the band's last two tours were far more chronologically varied than setlists for other tours. Although many of the songs performed were taken from Soundtracks for the Blind and The Great Annihilator, the band also resurrected songs from much earlier albums, including a re-worked version of "I Crawled" from the Young God EP (1984).

== Background ==
Disc one (Black) was primarily recorded at the Paradiso, Amsterdam on March 13, 1997, while "Blood On Yr Hands" was recorded at Irving Plaza in New York City on January 24. Three other songs that were performed in 1997 were not included on the disc: "The Man With the Silver Tongue", which appeared in a revised form on Angels of Light's 1999 debut LP New Mother; "My Birth", which remained unreleased until it appeared on Swans's 2010 album My Father Will Guide Me up a Rope to the Sky; and "The Sound", which was performed once in 1997 with significant differences to previous versions.

Disc two (White) was recorded at the Paradiso, Amsterdam on August 24th, 1995. Although "In", "Alcohol the Seed", and "Animus" were played during the concert, they did not appear on Swans Are Dead. VPRO, a Dutch radio station, recorded the entire concert except part of "Animus". Three other songs were played in 1995 that were not included on the disc: "Empathy", which has three known performances; "Blood On Your Hands", which was performed twice in 1995 with many differences to later versions; and "Raping a Slave", which was only played once after 1984 and in a significantly altered form compared to previous performances.

== Critical reception ==
Professional ratings
Review scores
Source	Rating
Allmusic	4/5 stars
Pitchfork Media	7.7/10

The Rough Guide to Rock described the album as "a head-churning final statement".

== Track listing ==
All tracks are written by Michael Gira, except "I Crawled" by Gira/Norman Westberg/Harry Crosby/Roli Mosimann, and "Lavender" and "Yum Yab" by Jarboe.

Disc one (Black, final tour 1997)
No.	Title	Also on	Length
1.	"Feel Happiness"	None	16:57
2.	"Low Life Form"	Michael Gira's Drainland (1995)	4:54
3.	"Not Alone"	Angels of Light's New Mother (1999)	13:12
4.	"Blood On Yr Hands"	Skin's Blood, Women, Roses (1987)	2:59
5.	"Hypogirl"	Soundtracks for the Blind (1996)	3:22
6.	"I Crawled"	Young God (EP) (1984)	10:05
7.	"I Am the Sun"	The Great Annihilator (1995)	5:27
8.	"Blood Promise"	The Great Annihilator	15:23
Total length:			72:19

Disc two (White, 1995 tour)
No.	Title	Also on	Length
1.	"Final Sac"	Skin's Shame, Humility, Revenge (1988) (as "One Small Sacrifice") and Soundtracks for the Blind (as "The Final Sacrifice")	8:44
2.	"The Sound"	Die Tür ist zu (1996) (as "Soundsection"), and Soundtracks for the Blind	12:52
3.	"I See Them All Lined Up"	Michael Gira's Drainland, Die Tür ist zu (as "Ich Sehe Die Alle In Einer Reihe"), and Soundtracks for the Blind (as "All Lined Up")	6:27
4.	"Lavender"	Jarboe's Sacrificial Cake (1995) (as "Lavender Girl")	8:03
5.	"YR PRP"	Soundtracks for the Blind (as "YRP") and Cop (1984) (as "Your Property")	8:51
6.	"Yum Yab"	Jarboe's Sacrificial Cake and Soundtracks for the Blind (as "Yum-Yab Killers")	4:36
7.	"Helpless Child"	Soundtracks for the Blind	17:44
8.	"M/F"	The Great Annihilator (as "Mother/Father") and Akron / Family & Angels of Light (2005)	3:25
Total length:			70:44 142:53

== Personnel ==
Credits for Swans Are Dead adapted from liner notes.

Disc one (Black)

- Michael Gira – vocals, guitar, compiling, mastering, producer, lyrics, music
- Jarboe – vocals, keyboards
- Bill Bronson – bass guitar
- Clinton Steele – guitar
- Phil Puleo – percussion, dulcimer (hammer)
- Dave Ouimet – performer
- Kris Force – performer
- Berry Kamer – recording
- Josh Wertheimer – live engineer, recording
- Chris Griffin – engineer

Disc two (White)

- Michael Gira – vocals, guitar, compiling, mastering, producer, lyrics, music
- Jarboe – vocals, keyboards
- Joe Goldring – bass guitar, guitar
- Vudi – guitar, keyboards
- Larry Mullins – percussion, vibraphone
- Andy Ray – live engineer
- Chris Griffin – engineer
