= Omniscience (album) =

1992 album

Live album by Swans
- Released: 1992
- Recorded: 1992
- Length: 57:00
- Label: Young God
- Producer: Michael Gira

Swans chronology
Love of Life (1992)	Omniscience (1992)	Kill the Child (1995)

Omniscience is the fifth live album by the American experimental rock band Swans. It was recorded from shows on their 1992 world tour. It is out of print and has never been reissued. The front cover photograph is by Larry Lame with many Deryk Thomas paintings in the booklet.

== Critical reception ==
Professional ratings
Review scores
Source	Rating
AllMusic	4/5 stars
Spin Alternative Record Guide	5/10

Trouser Press called it "a nicely-presented live document". Allmusic critic Ned Raggett wrote: "Ending with a fine version of "God Bless America" [sic] and the new, slow-grinding "Omnipotent," Omniscience is yet another excellent addition to Swans' body of work."

== Track listing ==
All tracks are written by Michael Gira, except "Black Eyed Dog," written by Nick Drake.

No.	Title	Also on	Length
1.	"Mother's Milk"	The Great Annihilator (1995)	4:39
2.	"Pow R Sac"	White Light from the Mouth of Infinity (1991) (as "Power and Sacrifice")	3:38
3.	"Will Serve"	White Light from the Mouth of Infinity (as "Will We Survive")	3:38
4.	"Her"	Love of Life (1992)	8:43
5.	"Black Eyed Dog"	The World of Skin's Ten Songs for Another World (1990)	3:35
6.	"Amnesia"	Love of Life	6:20
7.	"Love of Life"	Love of Life	8:33
8.	"(----)"	Love of Life	2:28
9.	"Other Side of the World"	Love of Life (as "The Other Side of the World")	4:00
10.	"Rutting"	Love of Life (as "In the Eyes of Nature")	1:52
11.	"God Loves America"	Love of Life	6:34
12.	"Omnipotent"	None	2:57
Total length:			57:00

== Personnel ==
- Michael Gira – vocals, guitar
- Jarboe – vocals, keyboards
- Clinton Steele – guitar
- Algis Kizys – bass guitar
- Vincent Signorelli – drums
