= Soundtracks for the Blind =

1996 studio album by Swans

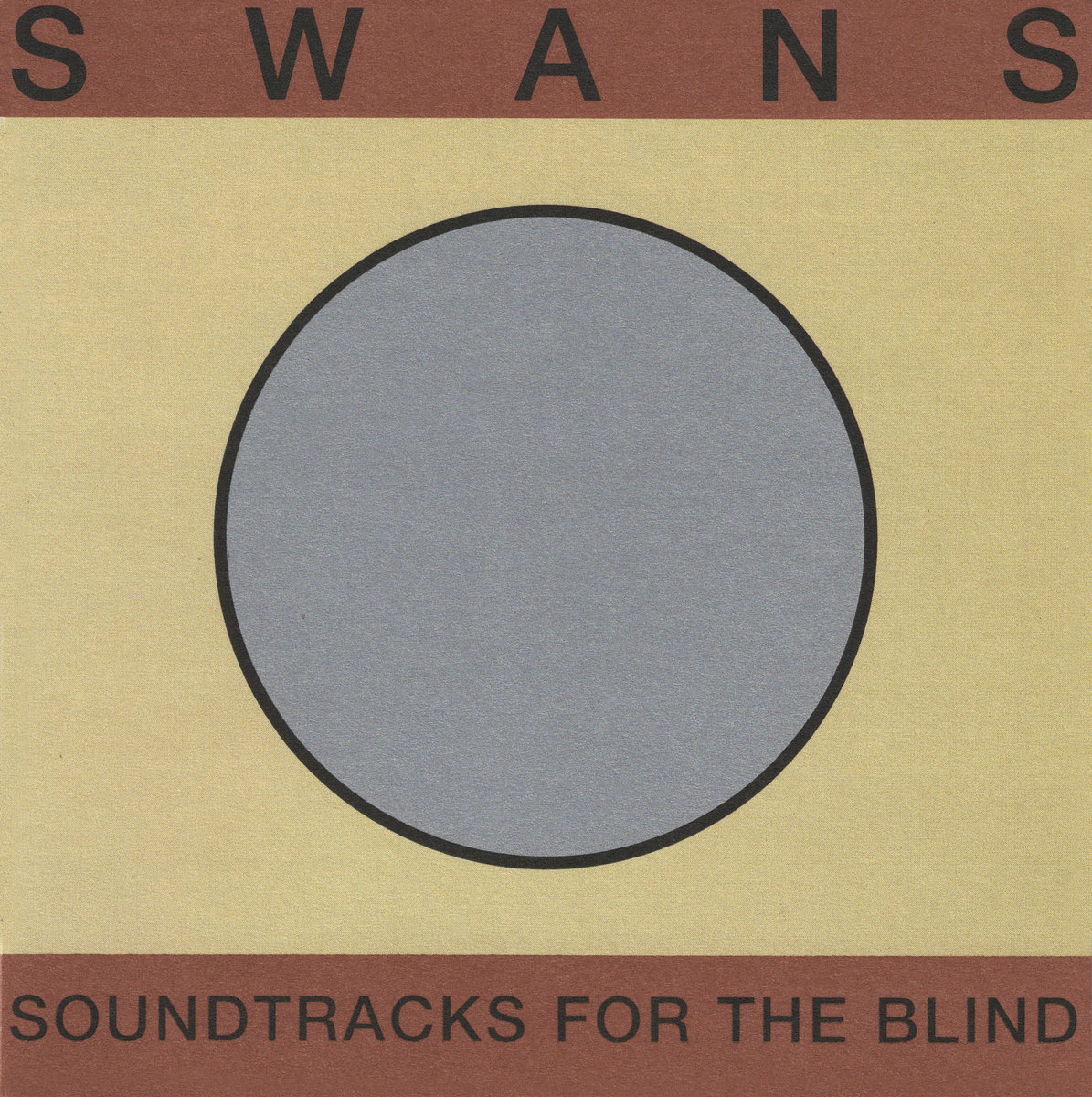

Studio album by Swans
- Released: October 22, 1996
- Recorded: 1981–1996
- Studios: Coast Recorders, San Francisco, California; B.C. Studios, Brooklyn, New York; Plastikville, New York City, New York; Griffin Mastering, Atlanta, Georgia
- Genres: Post-rock; drone; experimental; avant-garde
- Length: 141:37
- Labels: Young God; Atavistic
- Producers: Michael Gira, Jarboe (track 7)

Swans chronology
Die Tür ist zu (1996)	Soundtracks for the Blind (1996)	Swans Are Dead (1998)

Soundtracks for the Blind is the tenth studio album by the American experimental rock band Swans, released first as a double album on October 22, 1996. Conceived by the frontman Michael Gira as the group's final statement before their initial breakup, the album incorporates a wide range of archival material collected since 1981. Its construction drew on handheld cassette tapes, surveillance recordings, found sounds, and multitrack sessions, which were combined with new studio performances through digital editing and layering techniques. The resulting work has been described by Gira as an "immersive universe", introducing collaborators such as Larry Mullins and Vudi.

The album has often been regarded as Swans's most experimental and avant-garde release, being variously characterized as a post-rock and drone record, blending elements of ambient, industrial, folk, and musique concrète. Critics have highlighted its thematic focus on despair, oppression, aging, and human frailty, with several songs incorporating deeply personal recordings from Gira's father and Jarboe's family. Soundtracks for the Blind received widespread acclaim upon release and in retrospective assessments, with reviewers praising its scale, intensity, and emotional depth. It has since been recognized as one of Swans's defining works, cited as a "masterpiece" by several critics. Swans disbanded following a tour in March 1997 but reformed in 2010. The reformed band undertook new compositions and tours, blending their earlier intensity with the musical styles explored in Gira's post-Swans projects, later releasing My Father Will Guide Me up a Rope to the Sky (2010). Soundtracks for the Blind was later reissued in expanded editions, including its first vinyl release in 2018, and was ranked by Paste as the 175th greatest album of all time in 2024.

== Background and recording ==
After a brief and unsatisfactory major-label association with MCA Records for The Burning World (1989), Michael Gira founded Young God Records in 1991, granting him full artistic control. Subsequent albums, including White Light from the Mouth of Infinity (1991) and Love of Life (1992), emphasized long-form compositions and interludes. By the mid-1990s, Swans had moved toward extended, mood-driven pieces, culminating in The Great Annihilator (1995), which reintroduced aggressive, industrial textures that had characterized their early releases such as Filth (1983) and Greed (1986), while incorporating tribal rhythms. In 1996, the group released the EP Die Tür ist zu exclusively in Germany, which anticipated Soundtracks for the Blind and included early versions of several tracks, among them a German-language reworking of "Helpless Child" titled "Ligeti's Breath/Hilflos Kind".

By 1995, Gira had grown exhausted from the financial and creative demands of maintaining Swans and decided to make their next release a definitive final statement. Over the years, he had amassed a large collection of recordings, ranging from handheld cassette tapes and surveillance material to found sounds and multitrack sessions, recorded with ten different musicians. These included deeply personal family recordings: Jarboe drew upon surveillance tapes left behind by her father, a former FBI agent, which captured both her childhood voice and her mother's dementia, while Gira recorded conversations with his father as he was going blind, material that directly inspired the album's title. The album also contains spoken-word recordings of phone sex operators and children singing.

"I've always been interested in different sounds like that [...] I threw all those into the computer and assembled it that way. So, in some things, there's something from 1981 playing simultaneously with something from '85 playing simultaneously with something from 1996. It's cross-faded and blended and mixed so to speak in the computer, cut-up and sometimes looped and reversed."

— Michael Gira on the production of Soundtracks for the Blind

The production of Soundtracks for the Blind relied heavily on these archival sources, some dating back to 1981. Gira moved to Atlanta, Georgia and employed the Sonic Solutions mastering program to assemble the material, combining new performances with old loops, field recordings, and fragments of earlier work. Through techniques such as looping, reversing, cross-fading, and layering, he sought to create what he described as an "immersive universe" that encompassed the depth of Swans's stylistic evolution. The album introduced new collaborators, including Larry Mullins on percussion and vibraphone, Vudi of American Music Club on guitar, and Joe Goldring of Toiling Midgets. Bill Rieflin had previously appeared on The Great Annihilator and would go on to contribute to Soundtracks for the Blind.

== Musical style ==
=== Overview ===
Soundtracks for the Blind is regarded by journalists as Swans's most experimental and avant-garde work. It resists straightforward genre classification; critics characterized it as post-rock and drone music. Sources also described it as a blend between post-rock, drone, ambient, industrial, folk, techno, gothic rock, and musique concrète. Stereogum's Aaron Lariviere compared its sound to that of Godspeed You! Black Emperor, and, according to Ondarock critic Claudio Fabretti, combines avant-garde electronic elements reminiscent of Klaus Schulze with extended guitar passages that alternate between ambient textures and distorted noise. AllMusic's Ned Raggett wrote that the album ranges "from raging electric music in extreme to the gentlest of acoustic strums".

Soundtracks for the Blind contains twenty-six tracks and lasts over 141 minutes, making it the longest studio release in the Swans catalog. Its themes have been described as encompassing hopelessness, oppression, submissiveness, lust, and shame, and it is considered thematically devastating, encompassing, in the words of Thom Jurek of the Metro Times, the "darkness of the entire world". Musically, many of the songs are instrumental compositions. Several tracks are reworkings of earlier Swans, Gira, or Jarboe compositions, adapted into new arrangements for the album. Writing for Audio, Kurt B. Reighler noted that the album avoided conventional verse–chorus structures in favor of experiments with timbre and juxtaposition, citing the transition from "Her Mouth Is Filled with Honey" into "Blood Section" and the "twisted howl" of Jarboe's vocals on "Hypogirl" as notable examples. Andrew Lewandowski of Chronicles of Chaos also noticed that each track differs markedly from the one preceding it. These non-traditional structures led to critics and Gira himself describing it less as a traditional rock album than as a "soundtrack" to imagined films.

=== Songs ===
"Helpless Child"
"Helpless Child" explores child abuse from the perspective of a child, reflecting the gothic folk qualities found in the song.

"Volcano"
"Volcano", the only track produced by Jarboe, blends techno beats and fractured electronic rhythms.

"The Sound"
"The Sound" illustrates the album's use of unconventional post-rock instrumentation and experimental production techniques.

"Red Velvet Corridor" opens the album as an instrumental track, described by Cole Quinn of The Daily Evergreen as a "portal that launches the listener down into the caves of purgatory". It features a slowly evolving three-note theme, strings, and vocal drones, with subtle feedback and ambient tones. It is followed by "I Was a Prisoner in Your Skull", a dark ambient track with a confrontational and unsettling atmosphere. It is built around a recurring keyboard phrase, that is overwhelmed by layers of groaning voices pounding drums, and disorienting spoken-word samples, including a wiretapped recording of a criminal. It is cited by Raggett as a "clear forerunner" of Godspeed You! Black Emperor's "entire musical approach". "Helpless Child" is a fifteen-minute composition exploring themes of child abuse from the perspective of the child. Gira's lyrics convey intense feelings of longing, regret, warped love, cruelty, and atrocity. Built on an oscillation between two chords, the track begins with an eerie guitar loop and develops through acoustic and electric instrumentation, alternating between gothic folk and rock before building to a climactic crescendo. "Yum-Yab Killers" is a punk rock-inspired track that features live instrumentation with Jarboe delivering aggressive, chant-like vocals over a drum-driven mix with layered guitars. It is a live version of a track from Jarboe's 1995 solo album, Sacrificial Cake. Jarboe's lyrics, such as "I said come here, dear, you know what I'll do / I'll make you my mirror of the things that I chew", are delivered with an aggressive, "spit" or "poisoned honey" quality, as said by Jurek.

"The Beautiful Days" juxtaposes a post-apocalyptic drone with a looped sample of Jarboe singing as a child singing about a beautiful day, creating an unsettling, eerie effect. It caused Quinn the "most uneasy" feeling on the album, evoking the "soundtrack to nuclear armageddon". "Volcano" is the only track produced by Jarboe, and was created from a tape loop recorded on an eight-track at a friend's home. Utilizing a standard techno beat, it blends house-pop elements, sitar, fractured electronic rhythms, and her falsetto vocals. It has been described as a feedback-layered dance track with tempo shifts and experimental production techniques, remarked by music critic Anthony Fantano as "invent[ing] Grimes' whole career in five minutes and nineteen seconds". "All Lined Up" incorporates heavily effected vocals over layered noise, which is a reworked, "even more devastating" version of a track from Gira's solo album Drainland, according to Biba Kopf of The Wire. "Surrogate 2" is a drone-based ambient track featuring sound loops created by Jarboe using early digital delay techniques. "How They Suffer" blends field recordings of Gira's father describing his blindness due to a detached retina and Jarboe's mother suffering from dementia and discussing aging. The track has been noted for its poignant dark-ambient qualities and autobiographical elements. "Animus" features heavily processed guitar and sample-based textures, drawing comparisons to the ambient electronic soundscapes of the Orb.

"Red Velvet Wound" has been described by Sputnikmusic staff critic joshuatree as a "float-y, poppy" track with a dynamic flow juxtaposed against the following track, "The Sound" is a post-rock track, which draws inspiration from a short story by Hubert Selby Jr. and features a narrative of a prisoner hearing approaching sounds, which Gira connected to his own mother's lifelong struggle with insanity, turning it into a tribute to her "inwardness". The track builds over thirteen minutes through incremental layering of instruments and sound effects. Jurek argued it incorporated elements of Pink Floyd's "One of These Days" of Meddle (1971), reinterpreted in a "ominous, future-phobic, and frightening" manner. "Her Mouth Is Filled With Honey" incorporates unsettling samples and has been compared to horror-movie soundscapes, and "Blood Section" emphasizes churning, repetitive guitar patterns with shoegaze influences. Jarboe recounts performing "Hypogirl" under "particularly unusual circumstances", quickly driving to the studio for a commitment. The track begins with the sound of her "reacting after I shot back old whiskey belonging to my father" before recording her vocal. "Minus Something" incorporates recordings of anonymous voices, followed by "Empathy", where the narrator curses a moment of kindness as a sign of weakness, bridging earlier Swans eras.

"I Love You This Much" features harsh noise textures accompanied by subtle organ accents, while "YRP", a reworking of "Your Property" from Cop (1984), presents an experimental composition built from unconventional sound sources and sparse melodic elements. In contrast, "Fan's Lament" is characterized by joshuatree as a "choppy, lo-fi indie rock" style, and "Secret Friends" consists of ambient soundscapes. "The Final Sacrifice" is an extensive track that reprises the album's theme of love as a dynamic of dominance and submission. The track opens with an ascending violin swell that resolves into a hypnotic bass line, around which swirling guitars, crashing cymbals, and additional violin layers are arranged. The instrumental build recedes with the entrance of Gira, whose performance intensifies into a tormented scream before fading. "Surrogate Drone" closes the album as a drone-based ambient track, reflecting the mood of earlier transitions such as "Red Velvet Corridor" and "Surrogate 2", and providing a contemplative conclusion to the record. It is considered by Raggett an "unexpected yet appropriate" ending, allowing Swans to "bow out from recording on the highest note possible".

== Release ==
Soundtracks for the Blind was released as the band's tenth studio album on October 29, 1996, in the United States, under the labels Young God and Atavistic Records. Released only as a compact disc, it is a double album divided into two discs, Silver and Copper. The album cover depicts a gray circle with a black outline set against a yellow-beige cardstock background. The upper and lower portions of the cover are dark reddish-brown, with the band's name, "SWANS", printed in large black letters at the top. The album title, "SOUNDTRACKS FOR THE BLIND", appears in black lettering on the bottom portion of the cover. The album was issued in a cardboard digipak. The package included a lyric sheet inserted in an inside pocket, with a silkscreen print of a human boneyard on the reverse side. Jurek has described the visual presentation as "ambiguous", "austere", and "imposing".

Gira had proclaimed the end of Swans in 1996, stating Soundtracks for the Blind would be their last album, serving as a deliberate "swan song" for the group. In January 1997, Swans embarked on a final world tour, culminating in their last performance at the LA2 nightclub in London on March 15. The tour featured a mix of reconfigured Soundtracks for the Blind material, selections from earlier albums, and five previously unperformed songs. The performances were noted for their dynamic contrasts, ranging from quiet, ambient passages to intensely powerful moments.

Following the tour, Gira focused on systematically remastering and reissuing the band's back catalogue. One album, owned by another label, was initially excluded from this project. Gira planned to organize the reissues into a series of four double-CD sets. He later officially announced in early 1997 that Swans were finished. In 1998, the band released the live album Swans Are Dead in Germany as a eulogy, featuring performances recorded during the period following Soundtracks for the Blind and the farewell tour. In the intervening years, Gira directed his efforts toward new musical projects. The Body Lovers, launched in 1998, focused on instrumental soundscapes, drawing from archival Swans recordings and other source material. Angels of Light, debuting with New Mother (1999), pursued a more acoustic and song-oriented approach, emphasizing narrative-driven compositions with minimal accompaniment. Gira also released solo albums and expanded his label, supporting other artists and releasing experimental works. Jarboe pursued a solo career, frequently collaborating with former Swans members and other musicians.

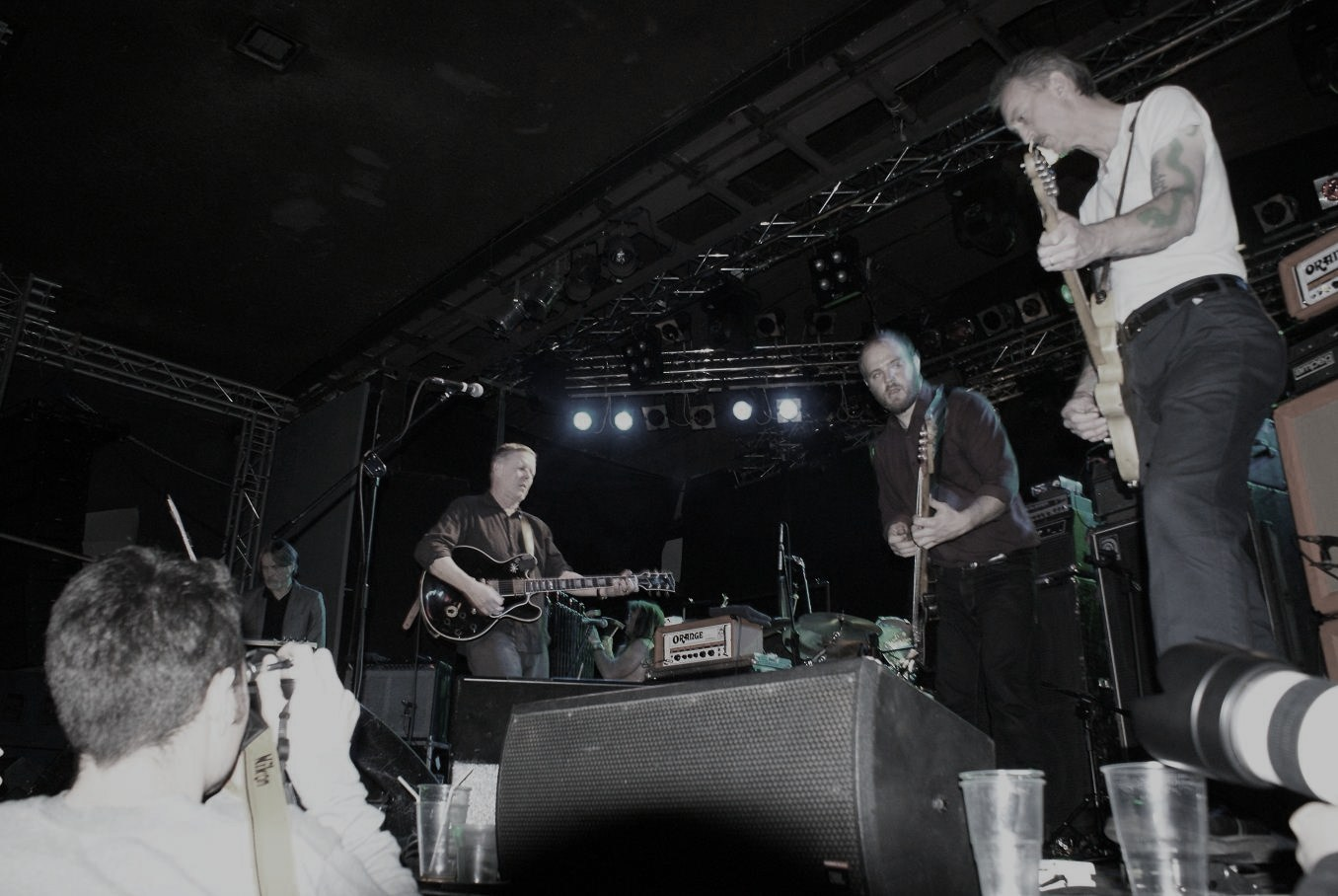
Swans performing live in Warsaw in December 2010

The idea of reviving Swans emerged around 2009, and the band officially reformed in early 2010, with Gira posting the phrase "SWANS ARE NOT DEAD" on his official Myspace page. He explained that the revival was motivated by new compositions that he considered intrinsically suited to Swans, describing the project as both a continuation and a reinvention rather than a reunion. The revival involved an intensive rehearsal and recording process, with sessions often lasting ten to twelve days, dedicating twelve-hour blocks to individual songs to allow them to fully develop. The first album of this era, My Father Will Guide Me up a Rope to the Sky (2010), blended the band's earlier intensity with the melodic and atmospheric sensibilities explored in Angels of Light. On July 20, 2018, Young God released Soundtracks for the Blind on vinyl for the first time as a limited box set containing four LPs, a poster, an insert, and a download card, followed by a standard gatefold LP edition. A concurrent CD reissue included the 1996 EP Die Tür ist zu as a bonus disc, and a triple-CD version replicated the original packaging. Soundtracks for the Blind has also received remastered vinyl releases. Fabretti said that the remaster incorporates electronic elements reminiscent of the "insane electronics" found on the more experimental tracks of the album.

== Critical reception ==
Professional ratings
Review scores
Source	Rating
AllMusic	4.5/5 stars
Alternative Press	5/5
Chronicles of Chaos	8/10
The Daily Evergreen	9.1/10
The Encyclopedia of Popular Music	3/5 stars
Metro Times	5/5 stars
Ondarock	7.5/10
Ox-Fanzine	4.5/5 stars
Sputnikmusic	4.5/5 (2008); 5/5 (2012)

Many critics evaluated Soundtracks for the Blind positively and have hailed it as a "masterpiece". From contemporary reviews, Metro Times' Thom Jurek called it Swans's "final statement" and praised it as evidence that the band was "exiting at the very top of their game". He described the album as "focused on their particular strengths" and found the work "almost unbearably beautiful", lauding its ability to balance seduction and horror, epiphany and despair, and concluded that it was "one of the most sexually charged and emotionally honest recordings" he had ever heard. It was received favorably in Alternative Press magazine, whose reviewer wrote that "Swans' out-and-out noise may have receded into quietude and somnolent hypnoscapes, but this monster of an album will leave ripples pulsing out for many years to come".

Kurt B. Reighler of Audio awarded the album a grade of A− for sound and B+ for performance, praising the album as an "ambitious collage" that combined found sounds, tape loops, and studio recordings into a "dense aural mélange". Reighler described the overall effect of the record as "akin to eavesdropping on dozens of psychotherapy sessions". Andrew Lewandowski, reviewing the album in Chronicles of Chaos, called it "a two-disc, two and a half hour monster" and "the band's most diverse effort to date". He praised the album's cohesion despite the juxtaposition of live and studio tracks, but criticized Jarboe's contributions, singling out "Volcano" as "destroyed by a cheesy hip-hop beat" and noting that her other pieces felt out of place.

Retrospectively, AllMusic critic Ned Raggett called Soundtracks for the Blind "[Swans'] best album ever", praising it as a definitive encapsulation of the band's sound. Raggett ranked the album at number 75 on his list of the best albums of the 1990s for Freaky Trigger. Aaron Lariviere of Stereogum ranked it as the third-best Swans album, describing it as the band's "weirdest" release. He characterized the record as "stuttering and schizophrenic, entirely engrossing, and just … more than you can wrap your head around". Praising its scope and complexity, he concluded that "there's literally nothing like it". The Daily Evergreen's Cole Quinn characterized the album as a "wild experience that is worth the two-hour run time". He described the record as difficult to classify beyond experimental and drone, noting its uneasy flow yet underlying sense of cohesion, concluding that it was "unlike any other record I listened to". On June 3, 2024, the album was listed 175th by the Paste magazine on the 300 Greatest Albums of All Time list.

== Track listing ==
All tracks are written by Michael Gira, unless noted.

Disc 1 (Silver)
No.	Title	Writer(s)	Length
1.	"Red Velvet Corridor"		3:04
2.	"I Was a Prisoner in Your Skull"		6:39
3.	"Helpless Child"		15:47
4.	"Live Through Me"		2:32
5.	"Yum-Yab Killers"	Jarboe	5:07
6.	"The Beautiful Days"		7:49
7.	"Volcano"	Jarboe	5:18
8.	"Mellothumb"		2:46
9.	"All Lined Up"		4:48
10.	"Surrogate 2"	Gira, Jarboe	1:52
11.	"How They Suffer"		5:52
12.	"Animus"		10:41
Total length:			72:06

Disc 2 (Copper)
No.	Title	Writer(s)	Length
1.	"Red Velvet Wound"	Jarboe	2:02
2.	"The Sound"		13:11
3.	"Her Mouth Is Filled With Honey"	Gira, Jarboe	3:19
4.	"Blood Section"		2:39
5.	"Hypogirl"		2:44
6.	"Minus Something"	Gira, Jarboe	4:14
7.	"Empathy"		6:45
8.	"I Love You This Much"		7:23
9.	"YRP"		7:47
10.	"Fan's Lament"		1:28
11.	"Secret Friends"	Gira, Jarboe	3:08
12.	"The Final Sacrifice (Note: The original 1996 CD titles the song "The Final Sac". All subsequent re-issues use the full title.)"		10:27
13.	"YRP 2"		2:09
14.	"Surrogate Drone"		2:06
Total length:			69:31

Vinyl version (Side one)
No.	Title	Length
1.	"Red Velvet Corridor"	3:04
2.	"Helpless Child"	15:47

Vinyl version (Side two)
No.	Title	Length
1.	"I Was A Prisoner In Your Skull"	6:39
2.	"Live Through Me"	2:32
3.	"Yum-Yab Killers"	5:07
4.	"The Beautiful Days"	7:49

Vinyl version (Side three)
No.	Title	Length
1.	"Volcano"	5:18
2.	"Mellothumb"	2:46
3.	"All Lined Up"	4:48
4.	"Surrogate 2"	1:52

Vinyl version (Side four)
No.	Title	Length
1.	"How They Suffer"	5:52
2.	"Animus"	10:41

Vinyl version (Side five)
No.	Title	Length
1.	"Red Velvet Wound"	2:02
2.	"The Sound"	13:11
3.	"Her Mouth Is Filled With Honey"	3:19

Vinyl version (Side six)
No.	Title	Length
1.	"Blood Section"	2:39
2.	"Hypogirl"	2:44
3.	"Minus Something"	4:14
4.	"Empathy"	6:45

Vinyl version (Side seven)
No.	Title	Length
1.	"I Love You This Much"	7:23
2.	"YRP"	7:47
3.	"Fan's Lament"	1:28

Vinyl version (Side eight)
No.	Title	Length
1.	"Secret Friends"	3:08
2.	"The Final Sacrifice"	10:27
3.	"YRP 2"	2:09
4.	"Surrogate Drone"	2:06

== Personnel ==
Credits adapted from the album's liner notes.

Swans

- Michael Gira – vocals, guitar, samples, sounds, loops, producer (all tracks except "Volcano")
- Jarboe – vocals, keyboards, sounds, loops, producer (on "Volcano")

Guest musicians

- Joe Goldring – electric guitar, bass guitar (disc one 3, 5, 9, 12; disc two 2, 7, 9, 12, 13)
- Vudi – electric guitar, acoustic guitar (disc one 3, 5, 9, 12; disc two 2, 7, 9, 12, 13)
- Larry Mullins – drums, percussion, vibraphone (disc one 3, 5, 9, 12; disc two 2, 7, 9, 12, 13)
- Cris Force – viola (on "Animus" and "YRP")

Additional musicians, various segments

- Bill Rieflin
- Christoph Hahn
- Clinton Steele
- Larry Lame
- Norman Westberg
- Algis Kizys

Technical

- Billy Anderson – recording and mixing engineer at Coast Recorders, San Francisco, California
- Martin Bisi – recording and mixing engineer at B.C. Studios, Brooklyn, New York
- Larry Lame – recording and mixing engineer at Plastikville, New York City, New York
- Chris Griffin – recording and mixing engineer at Griffin Mastering, Atlanta, Georgia
- Andy Ray – live engineer on "Yum-Yab Killers", "I Love You This Much" (segment), "The Final Sacrifice" and "YRP 2"
