= Kill the Child =

1995 album

Live album by Swans
- Released: 1995
- Recorded: 1985–87
- Length: 62:17
- Label: Disaster Records; Atavistic Records
- Producer: Michael Gira

Swans chronology
Omniscience (1992)	Kill the Child (1995)	The Great Annihilator (1995)

Professional ratings
Review scores
Source	Rating
Allmusic	4/5 stars

Kill the Child is the sixth live album by the New York City band Swans, released in 1996. It was recorded from shows in 1985, 1986 and 1987 in Germany, Yugoslavia, the United Kingdom, and (unlisted) the United States. The album was mastered as a single track in an attempt to recreate the concert experience, and focuses primarily on Gira-sung material from Children of God.

== Track listing ==
No.	Title	Length
1.	"Kill The Child": I. "Like a Drug (Sha La La La)"; II. "Beautiful Child"; III. "Blind Love"; IV. "Coward"; V. "Blood and Honey"; VI. "Sex, God, Sex"; VII. "[Untitled Intermezzo]"; VIII. "A Screw (Holy Money)"	62:17
