= Anhedoniac =

1998 studio album by Jarboe

Studio album by Jarboe
- Released: July 1998
- Recorded: August 1997 – May 1998
- Length: 64:30
- Producer: Jarboe

Jarboe chronology
Sacrificial Cake (1995)	Anhedoniac (1998)	Over (2000)

Professional ratings
Review scores
Source	Rating
Allmusic	4/5 stars
PopMatters	(8/10)

Anhedoniac is the fourth studio album by rock musician Jarboe. It was released independently in 1998.

== Track listing ==
All tracks are written by Jarboe.

No.	Title	Length
1.	"Anhedoniac"	3:46
2.	"The Cage"	4:53
3.	"Sinner"	7:09
4.	"Forever"	3:01
5.	"Rage"	1:34
6.	"Not Noah's Ark"	4:11
7.	"Sacred Disciple Wannabe"	3:08
8.	"Mississippi"	1:44
9.	"Burnt"	1:16
10.	"Anhedoniac Bottle"	5:32
11.	"Under Will"	4:33
12.	"Circles in Red Dirt"	4:23
13.	"Panasonic in Red Dirt"	6:29
14.	"Honey"	5:24
15.	"I'm a Killer"	7:27

2004 re-issue track listing
No.	Title	Length
1.	"I'm a Killer" (a capella mix)	6:45
2.	"Anhedoniac"	3:46
3.	"The Cage"	4:53
4.	"Sinner"	7:09
5.	"Forever"	3:01
6.	"Rage"	1:34
7.	"Not Noah's Ark"	4:11
8.	"Sacred Disciple Wannabe"	3:08
9.	"Mississippi"	1:43
10.	"Burnt"	1:16
11.	"Anhedoniac Bottle"	5:32
12.	"Under Will"	4:33
13.	"Circles in Red Dirt"	4:23
14.	"Panasonic in Red Dirt"	6:29
15.	"Honey"	5:23
16.	"I'm a Killer"	7:32
17.	"I'm a Killer" (instrumental mix)	7:48

== Personnel ==
Adapted from the Anhedoniac liner notes.

- Jarboe – lead vocals, bass guitar, piano, keyboards, Hammond organ, vibraphone, tape, effects, percussion, production, mixing

Musicians

- Jerry Blue, Brett Smith, Christus Snipes, Mark Spybey – effects
- Bill Bronson – bass guitar, drums
- Joseph Budenholzer – guitar
- Brian Castillo – guitar, bass guitar, drums
- Michael Evans – drums
- Brian Phrenzy – guitar, bass guitar
- Lary Seven – guitar, bass guitar

Production and additional personnel

- John Horesco III – engineering
- Richard Kern – photography
- William King III – mixing (15)
- Brian Castillo, Larry Seven – mixing
- Pan Sonic – mixing (13)
- Phil Tan – engineering

== Release history ==
Region	Date	Label	Format	Catalog
United States	1998	self-released	CD	
United States	2004	Atavistic	CD	ALP154
