= New Mind =

New Mind may refer to:

- New Mind (band), a band from the UK
- New Mind (song), a single by the band Swans
