= The Men Album =

2005 album

Studio album by Jarboe
- Released: October 17, 2005
- Length: 100:02
- Label: Atavistic
- Producer: Nic Le Ban, Chad Blinman, Iva Davies, William Faith, Kris Force, Chris Griffin, James Izzo, David J, Jarboe, Edward Ka-Spel, Robert Kaechele, Diana Obscura, Lary Seven, David Torn

Jarboe chronology
A Mystery of Faith (2005)	The Men Album (2005)	The Conduit (2005)

Professional ratings
Review scores
Source	Rating
Allmusic	(unrated)
Pitchfork Media	(4.8/10)

The Men Album is the sixth solo studio album by Jarboe, released on October 17, 2005, by Atavistic Records.

== Track listing ==
All tracks are written by Jarboe.

Disc one – Guitars
No.	Title	Length
1.	"This Is Life"	6:01
2.	"Found"	3:21
3.	"To Forget"	4:17
4.	"Reason to Live"	5:09
5.	"Redeemer (Lion)"	1:33
6.	"A Woman's Dreams"	7:42
7.	"Into Feral"	1:54
8.	"Feral Blixa"	2:07
9.	"Feral"	8:37
10.	"Your Virgin Martyr"	7:16

Disc two – Rhythms
No.	Title	Length
1.	"This Is Life, Meridiem"	5:54
2.	"Angel David" (Rilke mix)	4:04
3.	"Dark Strong Sauce"	0:44
4.	"Bass Force / Angel Jim" (Low Rider mix)	8:36
5.	"Torn Kiss"	2:17
6.	"Penance"	8:41
7.	"Subtraction"	4:53
8.	"Jarboe Feral (Durga)"	1:08
9.	"When the Sun Rises"	2:56
10.	"Edward Life"	12:52

== Personnel ==
Adapted from The Men Album liner notes.

- Jarboe – lead vocals, keyboards (2.6), production (1.7)

Musicians

- Nic Le Ban – guitar (1.7, 1.10), vocals (1.10), production (1.10), mixing (1.10)
- Blixa Bargeld – vocals (1.7, 1.8, 1.9)
- Blind Michael Bradley – vocals (2.9)
- Joseph Budenholzer – guitar (1.4, 1.9), engineering (2.8)
- Chris Connelly – vocals (2.7)
- Iva Davies – vocals (1.3), guitar (1.3), programming (1.3), production (1.3), mixing (1.3)
- William Faith – guitar (1.1, 1.9, 2.4), bass guitar (1.1, 1.9), programming (1.1), percussion (1.6), production (1.1, 1.6, 1.9, 2.4), engineering (1.1, 1.6, 1.9, 2.4), mixing (1.1, 1.6, 2.4, 2.6), editing (1.9)
- Kris Force – bass guitar (2.4), production (2.4), engineering (2.4)
- Percy Howard – vocals (2.1)
- David J – vocals (2.2), production (2.2), engineering (2.2)
- Paz Lenchantin – vocals (1.6, 2.4), violin (1.6), bass guitar (1.9)
- Diana Obscura – vocals (2.9), cello (2.9)
- Monica Richards – vocals (1.6)
- Michael Rollings – drums (1.9)

Additional musicians (cont.)

- Alan Sparhawk – vocals (1.2)
- Steve Von Till – guitar (1.9)
- J.G. Thirlwell – vocals (2.4)
- David Torn – guitar (2.5), production (2.5), engineering (2.5)
- Mika Vainio – vocals (2.3)

Production and additional personnel

- Chad Blinman – production (1.2, 2.7), engineering (1.2, 2.7), mixing (1.2, 2.7), programming (1.2)
- Joe Cassidy – engineering (2.7)
- Chris Griffin – production (1.9, 1.10), engineering (1.9, 1.10), mixing (1.10), editing (1.9, 1.10)
- James Izzo – engineering (2.6, 2.7, 2.10), production (2.6), keyboards (2.6)
- Edward Ka-Spel – production (2.10), engineering (2.10), mixing (2.10)
- Robert Kaechele – production (2.2), engineering (2.2), programming (2.2)
- Haroun Serang – engineering (1.8)
- Lary Seven – production (2.3), engineering (2.3)

== Release history ==
Region	Date	Label	Format	Catalog
United States	2005	Atavistic	CD	ALP167
