= Thirteen Masks =

Studio album by Jarboe
- Released: 1991
- Recorded: New York and Atlanta
- Length: 57:42
- Label: Hyperium
- Producers: Michael Gira, Jarboe, Roli Mosimann, Mark Richardson, Lary Seven, Clinton Steele, J. G. Thirlwell

Jarboe chronology
Thirteen Masks (1991)	Beautiful People Ltd (1993)

Professional ratings
Review scores
Source	Rating
AllMusic	4/5 stars

Thirteen Masks is the solo debut record by Jarboe, released in 1991 through Hyperium. The album features Swans members Michael Gira, Norman Westberg, Clinton Steele, and Tony Maimone of Pere Ubu.

== Track listing ==
All lyrics are written by Jarboe, except "In an Open Sea", "I Got a Gun" and "A Man of Hate" by Michael Gira; all music is composed by Jarboe.

No.	Title	Length
1.	"Listen"	4:21
2.	"Red"	5:14
3.	"A Man of Hate" (Lord Misery version)	3:56
4.	"The Believers"	4:01
5.	"The Lonely Voyeur"	4:18
6.	"The Never-Deserting Shadow"	3:40
7.	"Wooden Idols"	2:28
8.	"In an Open Sea"	4:41
9.	"Shotgun Road (Redemption)"	3:57
10.	"I Got a Gun"	4:45
11.	"Of Ancient Memory (The Oblivion Seekers)"	4:21
12.	"A Man of Hate"	3:48
13.	"Freedom"	4:07
14.	"Cries (For Spider)"	4:46

2004 remastered CD
No.	Title	Length
15.	"We Are the Prophecy"	6:51
16.	"St. John"	6:03
17.	"Surrender"	8:34

== Personnel ==
Musicians

- Jarboe – vocals, keyboards, electronics, percussion, production (1, 3, 5, 7, 9, 11, 12, 14)
- Michael Gira – electronics, bass guitar and production (3, 6, 8, 10, 13), mastering
- Tony Maimone – bass guitar (8)
- Lary Seven – instruments, production and engineering (1, 5, 9)
- Clinton Steele – guitar (6, 8, 11, 12, 14), production (12)
- J. G. Thirlwell – sampler, programming, arrangement and production (2)
- Norman Westberg – guitar (10)

Production

- Bryce Goggin – mastering, engineering (2)
- Donald Hassler – engineering (7)
- Steve McAllister – engineering (4)
- Roli Mosimann – drum programming and production (6, 8, 10, 13)
- Mark Richardson – production (3), engineering (11, 12, 14)
- Al Smith – engineering (6, 8)
- Wharton Tiers – engineering (10, 13)
