= New Mind (song) =

Single by Swans

from the album Children of God
- Released: 1987
- Genre: Industrial
- Label: Product Inc.
- Songwriters: Algis Kizys, Michael Gira, Norman Westberg, Ted Parsons
- Producer: Michael Gira

Swans singles chronology
"A Screw" (1986)	"New Mind" (1987)	"Love Will Tear Us Apart" (1988)

New Mind is a single by the New York City band Swans. The title track appears in a one-minute-longer version on the band's next studio album, Children of God. "Damn You to Hell" and "I'll Swallow You" are included simply as "I'll Swallow You" on the CD re-release Children of God/World of Skin, but not on the initial release.

== Track listing ==
No.	Title	Length
1.	"New Mind" (Single version)	4:03
2.	"Damn You to Hell" (12" version)	1:47
3.	"I'll Swallow You"	2:52
Total length:		8:43

== Musicians ==
- Michael Gira – vocals, sounds, keyboards, acoustic guitar
- Norman Westberg – electric / acoustic guitar
- Jarboe – vocals, all female background vocals, sounds, piano
- Algis Kizys – bass
- Ted Parsons – drums, percussion

== Charts ==
Chart (1987)	Peak position
UK Indie Chart	4
