= Like a Drug =

"Like a Drug" may refer to:

- "Like a Drug", song by Kylie Minogue from X
- "Like a Drug", song by Queens of the Stone Age from Lullabies to Paralyze
- "Like a Drug", song by Ty Dolla Sign from Free TC
- "Like a Drug (Sha La La La)", song by Swans from Children of God
- Like a Drug, mixtape by Canadian rapper Honey Cocaine
