= Feel Good Now =

1988 live album by Swans

Live album by Swans
- Released: 1988
- Recorded: 1987
- Length: 86:42
- Producer: Michael Gira

Swans chronology
Love Will Tear Us Apart (1988)	Feel Good Now (1988)	The Burning World (1989)

Professional ratings
Review scores
Source	Rating
AllMusic	4.5/5 stars
Ondarock	6.5/10
Spin Alternative Record Guide	6/10

Feel Good Now is the third live album by the New York City no wave band Swans. It was recorded on a Sony Professional Walkman on their 1987 Children of God tour in Europe. A remaster of the album, along with the studio album Children of God, was released on November 13, 2020.

== Track listing ==
Side A
No.	Title	Length
1.	"Intro"	0:38
2.	"New Mind"	5:27
3.	"Blood and Honey"	7:10
4.	"Trust Me"	4:54
5.	"Stupid German Talk*"	0:36
6.	"Into Blind Love and Out*"	0:30

Side B
No.	Title	Length
1.	"Willy in Ravensburg"	1:00
2.	"Sex God Sex"	9:46
3.	"Various Audience Tricks"	0:55
4.	"Like a Drug"	8:32
5.	"Our Love Lies*"	5:18

Side C
No.	Title	Length
1.	"Manchester in Love*"	1:00
2.	"Beautiful Child"	5:42
3.	"Blackmail"	4:22
4.	"Children of God"	6:38
5.	"Beautiful Reprise - The Town and Country Backstab Cowardice"	2:31
6.	"Thank You"	0:54

Side D
No.	Title	Length
1.	"Various Audience Members"	1:29
2.	"Hello to Our Friends"	0:22
3.	"Blind Love"	18:36
4.	"Thank You, Goodbye**"	0:11
5.	"Good Luck**"	0:11

Notes

- * Left out of the CD release
- ** Merged into one track on the CD release

== 2002 reissue ==
The album was reissued by Atavistic Records (ALP135CD) in 2002 having been remastered (according to the liner notes) by Gira at Micromoose Studio, Brooklyn, New York. The track listing of the reissue is different:

1. "Intro"
2. "Blind Love"
3. "Like A Drug"
4. "Blood and Honey"
5. "New Mind"
6. "Sex God Sex"
7. "Beautiful Child"
8. "Blackmail"
9. "Trust Me"
10. "Children of God"
11. "Beautiful Reprise Backstab"

("Trust Me" does not appear in the track listing on the liner notes)

== Personnel ==
- Michael Gira
- Jarboe
- Norman Westberg
- Algis Kizys
- Theodore Parsons

== Charts ==
Chart (1988)	Peak position
UK Indie Chart	7
