= The World of Skin (album) =

Compilation album by Skin
- Released: 1988
- Recorded: October – December 1986
- Genre: Dark wave
- Length: 73:17
- Label: Product Inc.
- Producer: Michael Gira

Skin chronology
| Shame, Humility, Revenge (1988) | The World of Skin (1988) | Ten Songs for Another World (1990) |

Professional ratings
Review scores
| Source | Rating |
|---|---|
| Allmusic | 4.5/5 stars |
| Pitchfork | 7.9/10 |

The World of Skin is an anthology album by The World of Skin, released in 1988 by Product Inc.

== Track listing ==
| No. | Title | Lyrics | Music | Length |
|---|---|---|---|---|
| 1. | "1000 Years" | Michael Gira | Jarboe | 4:01 |
| 2. | "Everything at Once" | Michael Gira | Michael Gira | 4:22 |
| 3. | "Cry Me a River" | Arthur Hamilton | Arthur Hamilton | 4:47 |
| 4. | "Breathing Water" | Michael Gira | Michael Gira, Jarboe | 4:22 |
| 5. | "Blood on Your Hands" | Michael Gira | Michael Gira | 3:52 |
| 6. | "Intro / Nothing Without You" | Michael Gira | Michael Gira, Jarboe | 5:43 |
| 7. | "We'll Fall Apart" | Michael Gira | Jarboe | 4:42 |
| 8. | "I Want to Be Your Dog" | Iggy Pop | Dave Alexander, Ron Asheton, Scott Asheton | 3:35 |
| 9. | "My Own Hands" | Michael Gira | Michael Gira | 4:38 |
| 10. | "Turn to Stone" | Michael Gira | Michael Gira, Jarboe | 5:20 |
| 11. | "Cold Bed" | | Michael Gira | 2:24 |
| 12. | "24 Hours" | Michael Gira | Michael Gira, Jarboe | 4:13 |
| 13. | "Red Rose" | Michael Gira | Jarboe | 4:29 |
| 14. | "One Small Sacrifice" | Michael Gira | Michael Gira | 6:42 |
| 15. | "Still a Child" | Michael Gira | Jarboe | 5:22 |
| 16. | "The Center of Your Heart" | Michael Gira | Michael Gira, Jarboe | 4:45 |

== Personnel ==
Adapted from The World of Skin liner notes.

- Howie Weinberg – mastering

== Release history ==
| Region | Date | Label | Format | Catalog |
|---|---|---|---|---|
| United States | 1988 | Product Inc. | CD, CS, LP | PROD US 11 |
