= Byla =

American musical duo

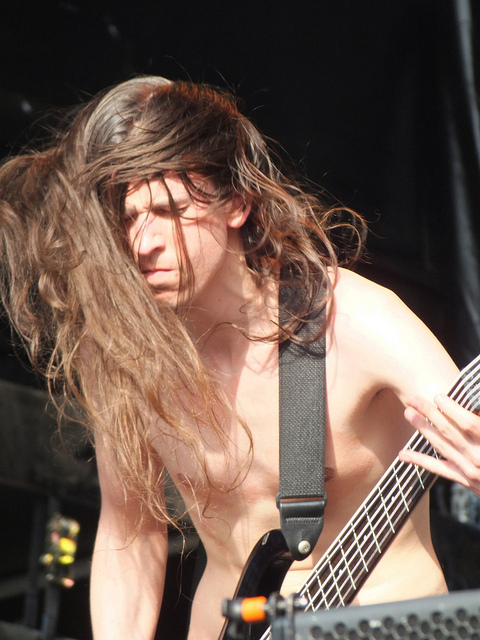

Background information
- Origin: Brooklyn, New York, United States
- Genres: Experimental, ambient, drone
- Years active: 2003–present
- Label: Translation Loss
- Members: Colin Marston; Kevin Hufnagel

Byla is an American ambient duo, formed in Brooklyn, NY in 2003 by Colin Marston (Behold... The Arctopus, Dysrhythmia, et al.) and Kevin Hufnagel (Dysrhythmia). They released their eponymous debut album in 2005.

Byla creates predominantly instrumental music, although in 2007, they released an album as a collaboration with diverse vocalist Jarboe (Swans). They also recorded an instrumental remix track—over 18 minutes in length—based on source material composed by isolationist musician Fear Falls Burning, which was released on a 5-disc LP album along with other remixes by artists such as Bass Communion and Final.

== Discography ==
Studio albums

- Byla (2005)

Collaborative albums

- Viscera (2007)

Appears on

- Fear Falls Burning - Once We All Walk Through Solid Objects (2007)
- Jarboe - The Cut of the Warrior (2018)
