= Over (EP) =

EP by Jarboe / Telecognac
- Released: 2000
- Length: 35:51
- Label: Crouton

Jarboe chronology
Anhedoniac (1998)	Over (2000)	Disburden Disciple (2000)

Professional ratings
Review scores
Source	Rating
AllMusic	1.5/5 stars
Pitchfork Media	7.0/10

Over is an EP by Jarboe and Telecognac, released in 2000 on Crouton Records.

== Track listing ==
All music is composed by Jarboe.

No.	Title	Length
1.	"Over"	16:14
2.	"Over"	5:12
3.	"Over"	14:25

== Personnel ==
Adapted from the Over liner notes.

- Jarboe – lead vocals
- Jon Mueller – keyboards, percussion, engineering, mixing
- Nick Pagan – piano
- Chris Rosenau – clarinet, engineering, mixing

== Release history ==
Region	Date	Label	Format	Catalog
United States	2000	Crouton	CD	crou007
