= Viscera (Byla and Jarboe album) =

Studio album by Byla + Jarboe
- Released: October 16, 2007
- Recorded: Spring 2006 – Spring 2007
- Length: 55:27
- Label: Translation Loss

Byla chronology
Byla (2005)	Viscera (2007)

Jarboe chronology
The Conduit (2005)	Viscera (2007)	J² (2008)

Viscera is a collaborative album by Byla and Jarboe, released on October 16, 2007 by Translation Loss Records.

== Track listing ==
All tracks are written by Byla and Jarboe.

No.	Title	Length
1.	"[untitled]"	15:35
2.	"[untitled]"	12:28
3.	"[untitled]"	10:58
4.	"[untitled]"	6:42
5.	"[untitled]"	9:46

== Personnel ==
Adapted from the Viscera liner notes.

Musicians

- Kevin Hufnagel – guitar
- Jarboe – lead vocals
- Colin Marston – guitar, recording, mixing, mastering

Production and additional personnel

- Mick Barr – guitar (5)
- Mosquito – recording
- Cedric Victor – art direction, design

== Release history ==
Region	Date	Label	Format	Catalog
United States	2007	Translation Loss	CD	TL24
