= Amy Granat =

American artist (born 1976)

Amy Granat (born 1976) is an American artist. She attended Bard College. She works with 16mm film, often manipulating it without using a camera.

Granat participated in the 2008 Whitney Biennial. In 2017 her film Cars, Trees, Houses, Beaches was included in the Saint Louis Art Museum's New Media Series. Her work is included in the collections of the Whitney Museum of American Art and the Museum of Modern Art, New York.

Granat collaborated on Steven Parrino's 22 minutes long, black and white, super 16 mm film Necropolis (The Lucifer Crank) for Anger (2004), made in collaboration also with Larry Seven, that is in the collection of the Centre Pompidou in Paris.
