= Mahakali (album) =

2008 album

Studio album by Jarboe
- Released: October 14, 2008
- Length: 70:29
- Label: The End
- Producer: Jarboe, Colin Marston

Jarboe chronology
J² (2008)	Mahakali (2008)

Professional ratings
Review scores
Source	Rating
Allmusic	4/5 stars

Mahakali is the ninth solo studio album by Jarboe, released on October 14, 2008, by The End Records.

== Accolades ==
Publication	Country	Accolade	Year	Rank
Rock-A-Rolla	United Kingdom	Albums of the Year	2008	29

== Track listing ==
All tracks are written by Jarboe, except "Kali Lamentation I, II & III" by Cedric Victor.

No.	Title	Length
1.	"MahaKali, of Terrifying Countenance"	4:13
2.	"And the Sky Which Once Was Filled with Light..."	0:46
3.	"The House of Void" (Visceral mix)	8:44
4.	"Transmogrification"	8:15
5.	"From Afar, Upon the Back of a Tiger"	1:06
6.	"The Soul Continues"	5:59
7.	"A Sea of Blood and Hollow Screaming..."	7:55
8.	"Overthrown"	5:16
9.	"Mouth of Flames"	4:44
10.	"Bornless"	4:28
11.	"Ascend"	4:59
12.	"Overthrown (Reprise)" (Jarboe version)	3:03
13.	"Mouth of Flames" (Jarboe demo version)	6:15
14.	"Kali Lamentation III"	4:11
15.	"Empty Mouth"	0:35

The End Records limited edition digipak track listing
No.	Title	Length
13.	"Kali Lamentation I"	3:00
14.	"Mouth of Flames" (Jarboe demo version)	6:13
15.	"Violence"	3:00

Season of Mist limited edition digipak track listing
No.	Title	Length
13.	"Kali Lamentation II"	2:51
14.	"Mouth of Flames" (Jarboe demo version)	6:13
15.	"Violence"	2:56
16.	"Empty Mouth"	0:34

== Personnel ==
Adapted from the Mahakali liner notes.

- Jarboe – lead vocals, keyboards, electronics, production, recording, musical arrangements

Musicians

- Jeff Eber – drums
- Kris Force – violin, mastering
- Josh Graham – guitar
- Kevin Hufnagel – guitar
- Julia Kent – cello
- Colin Marston – guitar, production, recording, engineering, mixing, musical arrangements
- Vincent Signorelli – drums
- Cedric Victor – bass guitar, electronics, production (13), musical arrangements (13)

Additional musicians

- Phil Anselmo – vocals (8)
- Attila Csihar – vocals (6)

Production and additional personnel

- Chris Griffin – engineering, mixing, mastering
- Scott Hull – mixing (3)
- Specialprojects for Discreetcases – cover art
- David Troia – recording (8)

== Release history ==
Region	Date	Label	Format	Catalog
United States	2008	The End	CD	TE118
United States	2008	Season of Mist	CD	SOM 191
