= J² =

Studio album by Jarboe + Justin K Broadrick
- Released: March 18, 2008
- Length: 41:09
- Label: The End
- Producer: Justin Broadrick

Jarboe chronology
Viscera (2007)	J² (2008)	Mahakali (2008)

Justin Broadrick chronology
Skinner's Black Laboratories (1995)	J² (2008)	Posthuman (2012)

Professional ratings
Review scores
Source	Rating
Alternative Press	3.5/5 stars
Pitchfork Media	(7.7/10)

J² is a collaborative album by Justin Broadrick and Jarboe, released on March 18, 2008 by The End Records.

== Track listing ==
All tracks are written by Justin Broadrick and Jarboe

No.	Title	Length
1.	"Decay"	7:31
2.	"Let Go"	6:27
3.	"Magick Girl"	8:41
4.	"Romp"	5:13
5.	"Tribal Limo"	7:16
6.	"8mmsweetbitter"	6:01

== Personnel ==
Adapted from the J² liner notes.

Musicians

- Justin Broadrick – guitar, programming, production, mixing
- Jarboe – lead vocals, keyboards

Production and additional personnel

- Peter Tsakiris – cover art
- Cedric Victor – design

== Release history ==
Region	Date	Label	Format	Catalog
United States	2008	The End	CD	TE096
