= The Conduit (album) =

2005 album

Studio album by Jarboe
- Released: 2005
- Recorded: Mothercrow Studio, Marrakech
- Length: 78:16
- Label: Atavistic

Jarboe chronology
The Men Album (2005)	The Conduit (2005)	Viscera (2007)

Professional ratings
Review scores
Source	Rating
Allmusic	4/5 stars

The Conduit is the eighth studio album by the rock artist Jarboe. It was released in 2005 on Atavistic Records.

== Track listing ==
All lyrics are written by Joshua Fraser.

No.	Title	Music	Length
1.	"Conduit 1"	Nic Le Ban, Jarboe	8:34
2.	"Conduit 2"	Nic Le Ban, Jarboe	6:21
3.	"Conduit 3"	Nic Le Ban, Jarboe	3:54
4.	"Conduit 4"	Nic Le Ban, Jarboe	8:28
5.	"Conduit 5"	Nic Le Ban, Jarboe	8:08
6.	"Conduit 6"	Jarboe	5:57
7.	"Conduit 7"	Nic Le Ban, Jarboe	4:40
8.	"Conduit 8"	Jarboe	4:11
9.	"Conduit 9"	Nic Le Ban, Jarboe	6:51
10.	"Conduit 10"	Jarboe	9:03
11.	"Conduit 11"	Jarboe	12:09

== Personnel ==
Adapted from The Conduit liner notes.

Musicians

- Jarboe – lead vocals, piano, organ, engineering, mixing
- Nic Le Ban – guitar

Production and additional personnel

- Chris Griffin – mastering

== Release history ==
Region	Date	Label	Format	Catalog
United States	2005	Atavistic	CD	ALP175
