= Children of God (Swans album) =

1987 album by Swans

Studio album by Swans
- Released: October 19, 1987
- Recorded: February–March 1987
- Studios: Sawmills, Golant, England
- Genres: Noise rock; gothic rock; blues rock; industrial
- Length: 71:13
- Label: Caroline
- Producers: Rico Conning, Michael Gira

Swans chronology
Public Castration Is a Good Idea (1986)	Children of God (1987)	Love Will Tear Us Apart (1988)

Singles from Children of God
- 1. "New Mind" Released: Summer 1987

Professional ratings
Review scores
Source	Rating
AllMusic	4.5/5 stars
The Encyclopedia of Popular Music	4/5 stars
Ondarock	9.0/10
Pitchfork	7.0/10 (2003); 9.4/10(2003)
The Rolling Stone Album Guide	1.5/5 stars
Spin Alternative Record Guide	7/10

Children of God is the fifth studio album by American experimental rock band Swans. It was released on October 19, 1987, through record label Caroline in America and on Product Inc., a sublabel of Mute Records, in the United Kingdom.

== Production ==
The album was recorded over the course of six weeks in February–March 1987 at Sawmills Studios in Cornwall, England. It represented a dramatic, experimental change in sound from earlier Swans releases, moving away from the brutality of previous work to explore acoustic instruments and more conventional song structures.

By 1986/7 Swans had run its course with the physical assault of sound that we had employed previously for the most part. I wanted to move on to other things and didn’t want to get stuck in some style, which in our case had the potential of becoming cartoonish if we’d continued in that direction. So, I pushed the music into unfamiliar territory.

— Michael Gira

== Release history ==
Children of God was reissued along with the World of Skin compilation (without the cover versions) as the 1997 Children of God/World of Skin CD. On the rerelease, the original album version of "Our Love Lies" was replaced with the version included on the Love Will Tear Us Apart EP. The re-release also added "Damn You to Hell" and "I'll Swallow You" (under one title as "I'll Swallow You") from the New Mind single. The tracks "Sex, God, Sex", "Beautiful Child" and "Children of God" were shortened by several seconds with earlier fadeouts, and "Trust Me" fades directly into the brief interlude at the end.

A remaster of the album, along with the live album Feel Good Now, was released on November 13, 2020.

== Reception ==
Children of God is widely considered one of the band's strongest and most popular recordings and the most acclaimed album of their early period. In 2003, Brandon Stousey from Pitchfork wrote that the album is "one of the band's strongest releases" and "established Gira as an Old Testament tyrant obsessed with the nature of love, human frailty, and the midnight beauty of black orchids". Writing for AllMusic, Ned Raggett wrote that "with flute, oboe, and strings adding further texturing to the often quite a lovely songs created by the band, Children remains perhaps the key album of Swans' career -- the clear signpost towards their ever-more ambitious albums in the future".

== Track listing ==
Original release

No.	Title	Writer(s)	Length
1.	"New Mind"	Algis Kizys, Michael Gira, Norman Westberg, Ted Parsons	5:13
2.	"In My Garden"	Kizys, Jarboe, Gira	5:34
3.	"Our Love Lies"	Kizys, Gira, Westberg	5:50
4.	"Sex, God, Sex"	Gira, Westberg	6:49
5.	"Blood and Honey"	Jarboe, Gira	4:46
6.	"Like a Drug (Sha La La La)"	Kizys, Gira, Westberg, Parsons	5:36
7.	"You're Not Real, Girl"	Gira	4:21
8.	"Beautiful Child"	Kizys, Gira, Westberg, Parsons	5:16
9.	"Blackmail"	Jarboe, Gira	3:34
10.	"Trust Me"	Jarboe, Gira, Westberg	5:23
11.	"Real Love"	Kizys, Gira, Westberg	6:23
12.	"Blind Love"	Gira, Westberg	7:46
13.	"Children of God"	Jarboe, Gira	4:34
Total length:			71:11

Some pressings of the CD divide "Trust Me" into two tracks: The actual song (4:28), and an unlisted/untitled interlude consisting of a field recording of a rowboat on the water, with birds in the background (0:57).

1997 re-release Children of God/World of Skin

Disc 1: Children of God
No.	Title	Length
1.	"New Mind"	5:12
2.	"In My Garden"	5:35
3.	"Our Love Lies" (Love Will Tear Us Apart EP version)	4:30
4.	"Sex, God, Sex" (edit)	6:36
5.	"Blood and Honey"	4:47
6.	"Like a Drug (Sha La La La)"	5:34
7.	"You're Not Real, Girl"	4:17
8.	"Beautiful Child" (edit)	4:52
9.	"Blackmail"	3:32
10.	"Trust Me" (fades into shortened rowboat recording)	4:58
11.	"Real Love"	6:20
12.	"Blind Love"	7:44
13.	"Children of God" (edit)	4:22
14.	"I'll Swallow You" (composed of "Damn You to Hell" and "I'll Swallow You" from the "New Mind" single)	4:14
Total length:		72:39

Disc 2: World of Skin
No.	Title	Length
1.	"1,000 Years" (edit, from Blood, Women, Roses)	4:02
2.	"Everything at Once" (from Shame, Humility, Revenge)	4:22
3.	"Breathing Water" (from Shame, Humility, Revenge)	4:18
4.	"Blood on Your Hands" (from Blood, Women, Roses)	3:53
5.	"Nothing Without You" (from Shame, Humility, Revenge)	5:43
6.	"We'll Fall Apart" (from Blood, Women, Roses)	4:43
7.	"My Own Hands" (from Blood, Women, Roses)	4:38
8.	"Turn to Stone" (from Shame, Humility, Revenge as "Turned to Stone")	5:21
9.	"Cold Bed" (from Shame, Humility, Revenge)	2:25
10.	"24 Hours" (from Shame, Humility, Revenge)	4:13
11.	"Red Rose" (from Blood, Women, Roses)	4:29
12.	"One Small Sacrifice" (from Shame, Humility, Revenge)	6:43
13.	"Still a Child" (from Blood, Women, Roses)	5:22
14.	"The Center of Your Heart" (from Shame, Humility, Revenge)	4:48
Total length:		65:00

== Personnel ==
- Michael Gira – vocals, keyboards, acoustic guitar, album cover concept and design, production
- Jarboe – vocals, backing vocals, piano, keyboards
- N. Westberg – electric guitar, acoustic guitar
- Algis Kizys – bass
- Theodore Parsons – drums, percussion
- Simon Fraser – flute on "In My Garden"
- Audrey Riley – cello on "Like a Drug (Sha La La La)"
- Lindsay Cooper – oboe on "Blackmail" and "Trust Me"
- Wilton Barnhardt – piano on "Blackmail"
- Rico Conning – production, engineering
- John Cornfield – engineering
- Laura Levine – sleeve photography
- Paul White/Me Company – sleeve artwork

== Charts ==
Chart	Peak position
UK Indie Chart	3
