= Disburden Disciple =

2000 album

Studio album by Jarboe
- Released: 2000
- Length: 67:47
- Producer: Brian Castillo, Jarboe

Jarboe chronology
Over (2000)	Disburden Disciple (2000)	Neurosis & Jarboe (2003)

Professional ratings
Review scores
Source	Rating
Allmusic	4.5/5 stars

Disburden Disciple is the fifth solo studio album by Jarboe, released independently in 2000.

== Track listing ==
All lyrics are written by Jarboe, except "Pure War" by Cedric Victor-DeSouza; all music is composed by Jarboe, except "Kiss of Life" by Brian Castillo.

No.	Title	Length
1.	"Bound"	6:56
2.	"Consume Me"	5:36
3.	"Dear 666"	5:12
4.	"Kiss of Life"	3:05
5.	"Scorpion"	6:44
6.	"Under"	6:44
7.	"The Seance"	7:04
8.	"Forbid"	5:25
9.	"Forgive"	6:22
10.	"Scarification"	5:01
11.	"Pure War"	9:38

== Personnel ==
Adapted from the Disburden Disciple liner notes.

- Jarboe – lead vocals, piano, Hammond organ, production, musical arrangements

Musicians

- Ibrahim Ahmad – percussion
- Brian Castillo – guitar, bass guitar, production, engineering
- Michael Courter – bass guitar
- Gabriel – percussion
- Hamdi – percussion
- Yariv Malka – guitar, percussion
- Renee Nelson – harp
- Diana Obscura – cello
- Chandler Rentz – drums, percussion
- Cedric Victor-DeSouza – bass guitar

Additional musicians

- Renee Nelson – backing vocals (7)
- Diana Obscura – backing vocals (7)
- Nick Pagan – piano (6)
- Rico – spoken word (2)
- Eva Saban – violin (8)

Production and additional personnel

- Erica George Dines – photography
- Yariv Malka – co-producer (8), engineering (8)

== Release history ==
Region	Date	Label	Format	Catalog
United States	2000	self-released	CD	
