= The Daily Evergreen =

Washington State University student newspaper

- Type: Weekly student newspaper
- Format: Broadsheet
- School: Washington State University
- Editor-in-chief: Lucille Stutesman
- Managing editor: Makani Pang
- Founded: March 1895
- Language: English
- Headquarters: Murrow Center, Room 122; P.O. Box 642510
- City: Pullman, Washington 99164
- Country: United States
- Circulation: 3,000 copies
- ISSN: 0028-9485
- OCLC number: 722913912
- Website: dailyevergreen.com

The Daily Evergreen is the weekly student newspaper for Washington State University in Pullman, Washington, United States.

The 3,000-circulation newspaper is distributed once a week throughout the academic year. The paper is printed at the press of the Lewiston Morning Tribune.

The Evergreen calls itself "the student voice of Washington State University," and generally keeps topics of student interest as the highest priority. It also covers city and county news. The only professional newspaper with reporters in the area is the Moscow-Pullman Daily News, based in Moscow, Idaho.

== History ==
Washington State University's Evergreen newspaper was first published in March 1895 as a 12-page broadsheet paper produced by seven editors. It cost 75 cents for an annual subscription or 10 cents per issue.

The College Record was the original student paper of what was then called "Washington Agricultural College and School of Science". The first issue was published in February 1892, just a month after the school officially opened that January. According to accounts in the first Chinook annual and a book by college president E. A. Bryan, copies of the four-page issue were printed on cream-colored satin. Ten issues were produced, ending with April 1893, before the paper folded due to debts to the printer. By 1902, when editors asked readers to donate old issues for their new archives room, none of them had ever seen a copy of The College Record.

After two years without a campus paper, students called a meeting and established a new paper with student Will D. Todd as editor. The students left no written explanation as to why they named it The Evergreen. The first issue came out in March 1895, and it has published continually during the school year since then.

Early issues consisted mostly of local news, essays and creative writing. News tidbits and jokes were also exchanged with other college papers of the West. Of this early period, Bryan wrote that the paper was "a clean, worthy sheet, breathing truly a college spirit of loyalty – full of news – full of many well-written articles – with some poetical contributions, most of them by a single student, now a distinguished alumnus."

The Evergreen had its first female editor-in-chief, Dora Lobaugh, in the spring of 1899. The Chinook yearbook had this to say:

"It has been said that a lady was not fitted for the editorship of a college paper, and not without some reason. Nevertheless, the fact that we have had a lady editor during this entire year and a college paper that has been up to the standard of any in the Northwest in every particular, has proven conclusively that there are exceptions to this rule. The other members of the staff, it is true, were loyal in their support, but the burden of work and responsibility were borne by the Editor."

The Evergreen was a monthly paper until the fall of 1899, when it became a weekly published on Wednesdays. In 1920, the paper increased to two issues a week, and in 1923 it started printing triweekly. In October 1950, student managers pushed to add Tuesday issues, and the Evergreen started coming out four days a week, Tuesday through Friday to avoid higher printing costs for Monday issues. It began printing Monday through Friday in 1980. In 2020, it shifted to weekly print.

By order of the college president, the Evergreen became a committee of the Students' Assembly a year after it formed in 1901. In early years, it was common for editors to also be part of student government. Byron Hunter, editor in the fall of 1898, was also student body president at the time.

The Greek system at the college grew dramatically in size and power during the early part of the century, and Evergreen editor-in-chief was a highly coveted campus position essentially controlled by the fraternities. Along with student body president, the editorship was negotiated among fraternity leaders along with other positions like yell king, class officers and Board of Control (student council) members.

Each year different campus organizations such as the freshman class and Talamathian Society got to be in charge of an issue. Special editions came out for events like Christmas, graduation and the football game against the University of Idaho, a tradition continued today with special sections for Mom's Weekend, graduation and home football games, along with an "orientation guide" issue sent to incoming freshmen and transfer students each August. The first summer edition came out in 1900.

During most of its history, the Evergreen has been published in a standard broadsheet size. An exception was World War II, when the Evergreen reduced its pages to a size similar to its current near-Berliner dimensions. It also published less frequently during the war, first biweekly and then weekly in order to use less paper.

According to Maynard Hicks, a longtime Evergreen adviser and journalism instructor, 1951 was a year of turmoil for the Evergreen. After a costly libel suit, the university took control from the student government and made the paper part of the journalism department, Hicks told an Evergreen reporter in 1995. Evergreen editors felt they had no control after the change, and the policy was changed again after a staff member tried to commit suicide.

A new teletype machine allowed the Evergreen to start using Associated Press copy in 1952. A number of students did not like the change, because it meant less space for student groups to publish free notices about their meetings and activities. The Evergreen also got new facilities that year when the new Compton Union Building opened.

The paper temporarily took up residence in the Old Education Building before another move in 1972 brought the paper to its current location in Murrow East, which had been renovated to house the communication school. Student Publications had been saving for seven years to purchase more than $50,000 in new typesetting equipment to allow a much broader range of type size and style.

By 1995, when the Evergreen celebrated its centennial, all page layout was done on computers and sent to the press in Spokane. All photography was digital by 2002. The paper's first website launched on April 1, 1996; story archives available online date back to 2001. The newspaper gained national attention for an erroneous story published in 2002 for Filipino American History Month that included a joke translation from Spanish to English that was copied from a website.

In 2007, a major redesign included changed folios and flag. In 2008, the pages were slimmed. The newspaper ceased printing daily editions in March 2020 due to the COVID-19 pandemic and switched to an online-only format. It resumed publishing late in 2020 with a weekly printing on Thursdays.

== Operations ==
Sections within the Evergreen include Campus, Community, and Sports.

Position duties vary with each section, and the editor positions roll over each semester. Editors-in-chief are elected by the Student Media Board. The editor-elect then selects the remaining staff positions from a pool of applicants.

== Structure within university ==
The Daily Evergreen is a product of WSU Office of Student Media, a department within the Division of Student Affairs. Formerly WSU Student Publications, The Office of Student Media included The Chinook Yearbook until 2025, when publication ceased.

The Student Media Board meets monthly to discuss operations and elects new student managers twice a year. The Board includes the director as a permanent voting member, along with two other faculty/staff members. The faculty and staff members come from specified areas of the university, and include a representative from the Murrow College of Communication. Student members are the editor-in-chief, section editors, and two students nominated by the ASWSU president. The board also includes two graduate students nominated by the GPSA president.

The statement of policies governing The Office of Student Media specifies that "editors and managers shall be free to develop their own editorial policies regarding news coverage, or content without interference by the university or its administrators, faculty, staff or agencies." It is further specified that students bear the legal responsibility for what they produce, and university officials are prohibited from requiring prior review, imposing sanctions on the basis of content, and denying funding on the basis of content.

Most of the Evergreen's funding comes from student fees, with the majority of those fees allocated by the Student Services and Activities Fees committee, which is made up of students and university employees to distribute money to student groups. The Evergreen also receives money from a $5 per student fee, which the students approved in 2018. Additionally, the Evergreen is funded by advertising sales and yearbook sales.
