= Sacrificial Cake =

1995 album

Studio album by Jarboe
- Released: June 9, 1995
- Recorded: Plastikville Studios, East Village, New York
- Length: 60:44
- Label: Alternative Tentacles
- Producer: Jarboe

Jarboe chronology
Beautiful People Ltd (1993)	Sacrificial Cake (1995)	Anhedoniac (1998)

Professional ratings
Review scores
Source	Rating
Allmusic	4/5 stars
NME	7/10 stars

Sacrificial Cake is the second studio album by Jarboe. It was released in 1995 through Alternative Tentacles, and is an accompaniment to Drainland by fellow Swans member Michael Gira.

== Track listing ==
All tracks are written by Jarboe, except "My Buried Child" by Michael Gira.

No.	Title	Length
1.	"Lavender Girl"	4:37
2.	"Ode to V"	7:26
3.	"Shimmer" (instrumental)	2:16
4.	"My Buried Child"	2:11
5.	"Not Logical"	5:26
6.	"Spiral Staircase"	4:25
7.	"Yum-Yab"	2:55
8.	"Surgical Saviour"	4:17
9.	"Caché Toi"	0:26
10.	"Tragic Seed"	2:13
11.	"Troll Lullaby"	3:11
12.	"Deflowered"	3:41
13.	"The Body Lover"	3:37
14.	"Shimmer"	3:18
15.	"Act III"	1:46
16.	"Troll"	8:45
Total length:		60:44

== Personnel ==
Musicians

- Jarboe – vocals, keyboards, guitar, bass guitar, tape, production
- Michael Gira – acoustic guitar (4), mixing, design
- Lary Seven – electric guitar, double bass, percussion, engineering
- Michael Evans – drums (2, 15, 16)

Production and additional personnel

- Chris Griffin – mastering
- Berry Kamer – production and recording (4)
- Clinton Steele – mixing
- Deryk Thomas – painting
