= Shame, Humility, Revenge =

Studio album by Skin
- Released: June 27, 1988
- Recorded: October–December 1986
- Length: 38:23
- Label: Product Inc.
- Producer: Michael Gira

Skin chronology
| Blood, Women, Roses (1987) | Shame, Humility, Revenge (1988) | The World of Skin (1988) |

Professional ratings
Review scores
| Source | Rating |
|---|---|
| Allmusic | 4/5 stars |

Shame, Humility, Revenge is the second studio album by Skin, released in 1988 by Product Inc.

== Track listing ==
All lyrics are written by Michael Gira.

Side one
| No. | Title | Music | Length |
|---|---|---|---|
| 1. | "Nothing Without You" | Michael Gira, Jarboe | 5:57 |
| 2. | "Everything at Once" | Michael Gira | 4:32 |
| 3. | "Breathing Water" | Michael Gira, Jarboe | 4:25 |
| 4. | "The Center of Your Heart" | Michael Gira, Jarboe | 4:48 |

Side two
| No. | Title | Music | Length |
|---|---|---|---|
| 1. | "Cold Bed" | Michael Gira | 2:25 |
| 2. | "24 Hours" | Michael Gira, Jarboe | 4:13 |
| 3. | "One Small Sacrifice" | Michael Gira | 6:43 |
| 4. | "Turned to Stone" | Michael Gira, Jarboe | 5:21 |

CD edition bonus track
| No. | Title | Writer(s) | Length |
|---|---|---|---|
| 9. | "I Want to Be Your Dog" | Dave Alexander, Ron Asheton, Scott Asheton, Iggy Pop | 3:38 |

== Personnel ==
Adapted from the Shame, Humility, Revenge liner notes.

Musicians

- Michael Gira – lead vocals, acoustic guitar, keyboards, piano, effects, musical arrangement, production
- Jarboe – backing vocals, keyboards, piano

Additional musicians

- Gini Ball – violin (A3)
- Kadir Durvesh – Indian oboe (A2, A4)
- Martin McCarrick – cello (A3)
- Billy McGee – double bass (A3), musical arrangement, (A3)
- Chris Pitzaladi – viola (A3)
- Chris Tombling – violin (A3)

Production and additional personnel

- Roop Caulson – engineering
- Ian Cooper – mastering
- Skin – design
- Monica Curtin – photography
- John Fryer – engineering
- Paul Kendall – engineering, programming
- Dave Powell – engineering

== Release history ==
| Region | Date | Label | Format | Catalog |
|---|---|---|---|---|
| United Kingdom | 1988 | Product Inc. | CD, LP | PROD 11 |
