= Drainland =

Studio album by M. Gira
- Released: June 9, 1995
- Recorded: August 1994
- Studios: Rieflin's living room, Seattle, Washington
- Length: 46:05
- Labels: Alternative Tentacles; Sub Rosa
- Producers: Michael Gira; Jarboe; Bill Rieflin

M. Gira chronology
| Drainland (1995) | Jarboe Emergency Medical Fund (1999) |

Drainland is the debut solo studio album by American musician Michael Gira. It was released on June 9, 1995, through Alternative Tentacles. Using spare arrangements recorded in August 1994 at musician Bill Rieflin's Seattle home, the album features contributions from Rieflin and Gira's Swans bandmate Jarboe. The album cover is a photo of a war tunnel in northern France built during the first World War.

Jarboe released her 1995 solo studio album Sacrificial Cake as an accompaniment to Drainland. In April 2017, the record was remastered and re-released together with The Great Annihilator by Swans, which has since been described as an accompanying record to Drainland.

== Music and lyrics ==
The album's sound is characterized by its "hypnotically strummed guitars, chiming bells and eerie swirls of synthesizer and sound effects." The tracks "Where Does Your Body Begin?", "Unreal" and "Your Naked Body" are primarily acoustic-based and feature various extra instrumental touches, including keyboards and samples. Lyrically, the album explores Gira's "self-delusion of alcoholic detachment," as well as humorous interpretations of "rock star culture and expectations" on tracks such as "Fan Letter."

The song "Where Does Your Body Begin?" has the same lyrics as the song "Where Does A Body End?" from The Great Annihilator, linking the two "companion albums" together. The track "Blind" is originally a Swans song and was taken from the recording sessions for the White Light from the Mouth of Infinity (1991) sessions, and would appear on the 2015 reissue of the album.

== Critical reception ==
Professional ratings
Review scores
| Source | Rating |
|---|---|
| AllMusic | 2.5/5 stars |
| Pitchfork | 7.4/10 |

AllMusic critic Ned Raggett compared Drainland to accompanying Jarboe piece Sacrificial Cake, describing the album as "a less of a mixed bag than Jarboe's own musically varied solo efforts, yet it has distinct strengths." Raggett further wrote: "Gira brings his expected bleak, alienated but still heartfelt lyrical visions to the fore, steering away from the full, epic grind of Swans and towards a variety of more restrained musical visions." SF Weekly wrote: "Whether they're strumming sweet melodies on acoustic guitars or banging large metallic objects together, Gira and dulcet-toned partner Jarboe turn sunshine into something sinister." Philip Sherburne of Wondering Sound described the record as a "bitter and at times bilious album, an unsparing self-portrait of the artist as an ugly man."

== Track listing ==
All music is composed by Michael Gira, Jarboe and Bill Rieflin, except where noted.

| No. | Title | Length |
|---|---|---|
| 1. | "You See Through Me" | 5:41 |
| 2. | "Where Does Your Body Begin?" | 3:04 |
| 3. | "I See Them All Lined Up" | 4:13 |
| 4. | "Unreal" | 4:48 |
| 5. | "Fan Letter" | 7:01 |
| 6. | "Your Naked Body" | 2:30 |
| 7. | "Low Life Form" | 3:41 |
| 8. | "If You..." | 4:41 |
| 9. | "Why I Ate My Wife" | 5:53 |
| 10. | "Blind" (Gira) | 4:33 |
| Total length: | | 46:05 |

== Personnel ==
- Michael Gira – vocals, electric and acoustic guitar, samples, production, engineering, design, arrangement
- Bill Rieflin – keyboards, electric bass guitar, samples, programming, production, arrangement, engineering
- Jarboe – backing vocals, sounds, keyboards, samples, production, arrangement
- John Yates – layout
- Wim Van De Hulst – photography

Additional personnel on "Blind":

- Kristof Hahn – guitars
- Clinton Steele – guitars
- Jenny Wade – bass guitar
- Anton Fier – drums
