= Die Tür ist zu =

1996 EP

EP by Swans
- Released: 1996
- Recorded: 1991–1996
- Length: 55:09
- Label: Rough Trade; Revolver; Young God

Swans chronology
The Great Annihilator (1995)	Die Tür ist zu (1996)	Soundtracks for the Blind (1996)

Professional ratings
Review scores
Source	Rating
Allmusic	4.5/5 stars
Q	3/5 stars

Die Tür ist zu (German for The Door Is Closed) is the fifth EP by the American rock band Swans, initially released in 1996 only in Germany as a CD, and later released worldwide on vinyl on Record Store Day 2018.

It is particularly notable for its unusual combination of both studio and live recordings in a wide variety of contexts. Specifically, it contains early, German-language versions of two songs on the then unreleased Soundtracks for the Blind album, two studio outtakes ("Surrogate Drones" which would also appear later on Soundtracks for the Blind, and "You Know Everything (reprise 1991)" recorded for White Light From the Mouth of Infinity and already released on the "Celebrity Lifestyle" CD single), a radio performance excerpt from the VPRO session on 14 December 1994, and two live songs from the Astoria, London, 1995.

== Track listing ==
No.	Title	English Version	Length
1.	"Ligeti's Breath / Hilflos Kind"	Ligeti's Breath: "The Beautiful Days" & "I Love You This Much", Hilflos Kind: "Helpless Child"	22:16
2.	"Ich sehe die Alle in einer Reihe"	"All Lined Up"	4:47
3.	"Surrogate Drones"	"Surrogate 2"	2:56
4.	"YRP" (Live in London)		8:51
5.	"You Know Everything" (reprise 1991)		4:26
6.	"M/F" (acoustic live at VPRO, 14 December 1994)	"Mother/Father"	3:52
7.	"Soundsection"	"The Sound"	7:56

== Notes ==
During the session at VPRO also the songs "I See Them All Lined Up", "My Buried Child" (which appears on the "I Am the Sun" 7") and "She Lives!" were recorded all acoustic.
