= Ten Songs for Another World =

Studio album by The World of Skin
- Released: 1990
- Recorded: April–June 1990
- Studio: B.Monster Studio, NYC
- Length: 42:22
- Label: Young God
- Producer: Michael Gira

Skin chronology
The World of Skin (1988)	Ten Songs for Another World (1990)

Ten Songs for Another World is the third and final studio album by The World of Skin, released in 1990 by Young God Records.

== Accolades ==
Publication	Country	Accolade	Year	Rank
Terrorizer	United Kingdom	100 Most Important Albums of the Nineties	2000	*
* denotes an unordered list.

== Track listing ==
No.	Title	Writer(s)	Length
1.	"Please Remember Me"	Michael Gira	5:07
2.	"Drink to Me Only with Thine Eyes"	traditional	1:59
3.	"The Child's Right"	Michael Gira	3:33
4.	"Everything for Maria"	Jarboe	5:07
5.	"I'll Go There, Take Me Home"	Michael Gira	3:55
6.	"Black Eyed Dog"	Nick Drake	4:01
7.	"A Parasite and Other Memories"	Michael Gira	3:01
8.	"Dream Dream"	Jarboe	5:36
9.	"You'll Never Forget"	Michael Gira	3:29
10.	"Mystery of Faith"	Jarboe	6:33

== Personnel ==
Adapted from the Ten Songs for Another World liner notes.

Musicians

- Michael Gira – vocals, acoustic guitar, keyboards, sampler, tape, drum programming, percussion, production, photography, design
- Jarboe – vocals, keyboards, piano, backing vocals

Additional musicians

- Tony Maimone – bass guitar (4)
- Roli Mosimann – drum programming (4)
- Andrea Pennisi – percussion (3)
- Clinton Steele – electric guitar, acoustic guitar (1, 3–6, 9)

Production and additional personnel

- Keith Maltbey – photography
- Steve McAllister – recording, mixing, percussion
- Howie Weinberg – mastering

== Release history ==
Region	Date	Label	Format	Catalog
United States	1990	Young God	CD, CS, LP	YG02
