= The World of Skin =

American music project

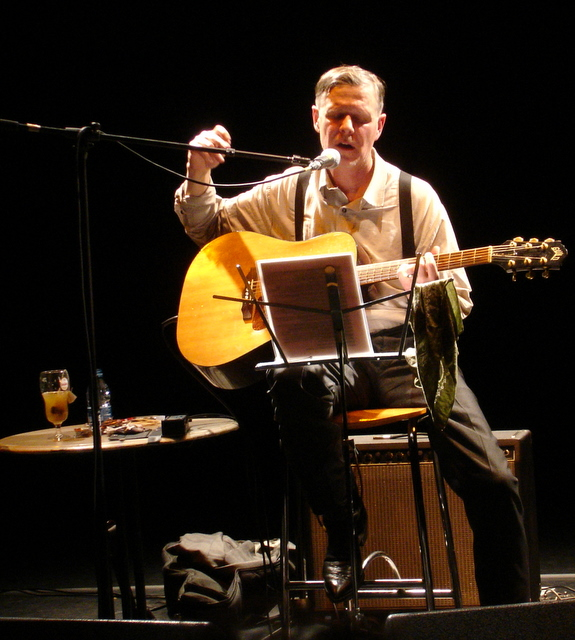
Michael Gira

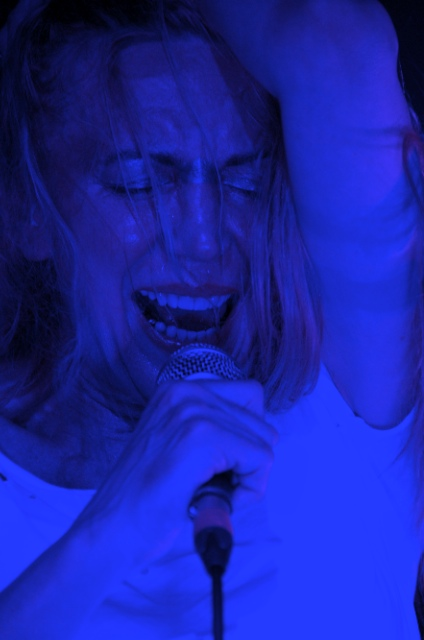
Jarboe

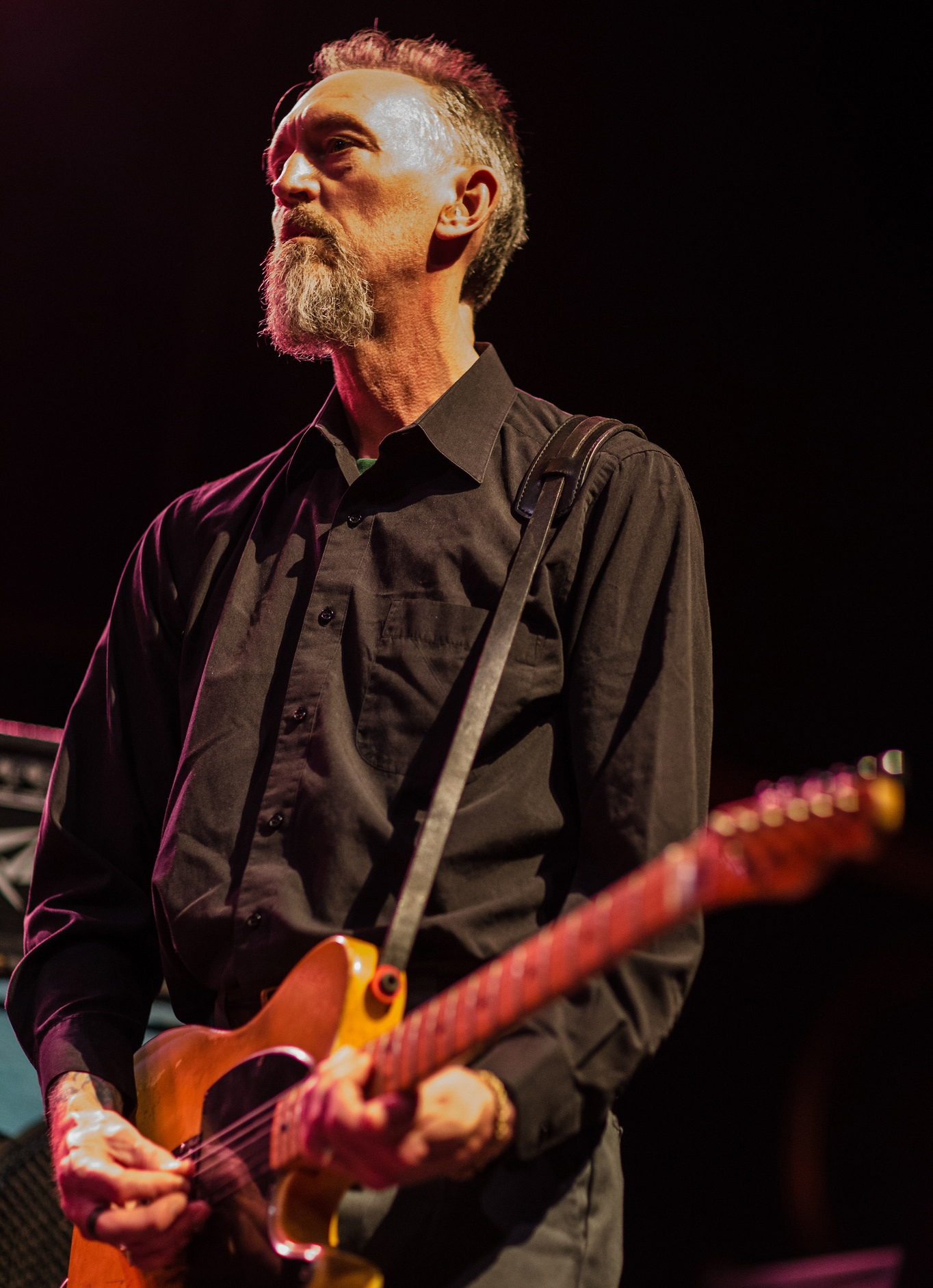
Norman Westberg

The World of Skin was a music project springing out of the American group Swans, which was a collaboration between the core Swans members Michael Gira and Jarboe. The project was initially called Skin, with the first two albums being released under that name, the last one being released under the name the World of Skin. In the UK, the first two albums were released by Product Inc., an imprint of Mute Records, while the last was released on Gira's own Young God label.

== History ==
Swans' album Greed began a trend toward greater use of melody, and this trend continued with the later Children of God. The work performed as Skin was initially in marked contrast with the less overtly melodic but contemporaneous Swans work, but later Swans work integrated the two aspects.

Blood, Women, Roses (1987) was the project's first release and featured vocals entirely by Jarboe, who had previously mainly been performing backing vocals. Many of the tracks still featured the monumental use of percussion that was common in earlier Swans work, but combined this with a greater use of melody ("Red Rose" is typical of this).

Blood, Women, Roses was followed in 1988 by Shame, Humility, Revenge, which featured vocals by Michael Gira (although Jarboe did perform some backing vocals). The first two albums were released only in Europe, but most of the albums’ tracks were combined in the US release World of Skin (released under the band name World of Skin), which was followed by the final World of Skin release, Ten Songs for Another World. This album featured vocals from both performers, including a cover of Nick Drake's "Black-Eyed Dog" that was performed by Jarboe.

== Group members ==
- Michael Gira - vocals, guitar, keyboards, samples, sounds (1987–1990)
- Jarboe - vocals, keyboards, sounds (1987–1990)
- Norman Westberg - guitar (1988)
- Harry Crosby - bass (1988)

== Discography ==
=== Studio releases ===
- Blood, Women, Roses (1987)
- Shame, Humility, Revenge (1988)
- Ten Songs for Another World (1990)

=== Compilations ===
- The World of Skin (1988)

=== Singles ===
- Girl, Come Out 12" (1987)
- One Thousand Years 12" (1987)
