= Blood, Women, Roses =

Studio album by Skin
- Released: April 27, 1987
- Recorded: October–December 1986
- Length: 39:15
- Label: Product Inc.
- Producer: Michael Gira

Skin chronology
Blood, Women, Roses (1987)	Shame, Humility, Revenge (1988)

Professional ratings
Review scores
Source	Rating
Allmusic	4.5/5 stars

Blood, Women, Roses is the debut studio album by Skin, released in 1987 by Product Inc.

== Track listing ==
Side one
No.	Title	Lyrics	Music	Length
1.	"One Thousand Years"	Michael Gira	Jarboe	5:09
2.	"Cry Me a River"	Arthur Hamilton	Arthur Hamilton	4:48
3.	"We'll Fall Apart"	Michael Gira	Jarboe	4:43
4.	"Still a Child"	Michael Gira	Jarboe	5:23

Side two
No.	Title	Lyrics	Music	Length
1.	"Come Out"	Michael Gira, Jarboe	Michael Gira, Jarboe	4:47
2.	"The Man I Love"	Ira Gershwin	George Gershwin	5:52
3.	"Red Rose"	Michael Gira	Jarboe	4:29
4.	"Blood on Your Hands"	Michael Gira	Michael Gira	4:04

CD edition bonus tracks
No.	Title	Lyrics	Music	Length
9.	"My Own Hands"	Michael Gira	Michael Gira	4:55
10.	"Come Out" (vocal dub)	Michael Gira, Jarboe	Michael Gira, Jarboe	3:09
11.	"The Man I Love" (live)	Ira Gershwin	George Gershwin	3:52

== Personnel ==
Adapted from the Blood, Women, Roses liner notes.

Musicians

- Gini Ball – violin
- Michael Gira – drum programming, effects, musical arrangement, production
- Jarboe – lead vocals, keyboards, piano, effects, musical arrangement
- Martin McCarrick – cello
- Billy McGee – double bass, musical arrangement (A1)
- Chris Pitzaladi – viola
- Chris Tombling – violin

Additional musicians

- William Barnhardt – piano (B2)
- Linda Miller – cello (A1)

Production and additional personnel

- Roop Caulson – engineering
- Ian Cooper – mastering
- Monica Curtin – photography
- John Fryer – engineering
- Paul Kendall – engineering
- Dave Powell – engineering
- Skin – design
- Paul White – design

== Release history ==
Region	Date	Label	Format	Catalog
United Kingdom	1987	Product Inc.	CD, LP	PROD 4
