= The Great Annihilator =

Studio album by Swans
- Released: January 24, 1995
- Recorded: February 1993 – June 1994
- Studios: Various: B. C. Studios (New York City); Baby Monster Studios (New York City); Plastikville Studios (New York City); Warzone (Chicago)
- Genres: Gothic rock; post-punk
- Length: 68:06
- Label: Young God
- Producer: Michael Gira

Swans chronology
Kill the Child (1995)	The Great Annihilator (1995)	Die Tür ist zu (EP) (1996)

Singles from The Great Annihilator
- 1. "Celebrity Lifestyle" Released: October 24, 1995; 2. "I Am The Sun" Released: 1997; 3. "Mind/Body/Light/Sound" Released: April 3, 2017

The Great Annihilator is the ninth studio album by American experimental rock band Swans. It was released on January 24, 1995, through frontman Michael Gira's own record label, Young God. The album has been described by Gira as a companion album to his solo album Drainland (1995); the two were remastered and re-released together in April 2017.

== Content ==
The album features a shift towards more prominent melodies and cleaner production than Swans' earlier work. Lyrical subjects include death and the human condition. Music critic Saby Reyes-Kulkarni, writing for Pitchfork, describing band leader Michael Gira's singing style on much of the album "leers as if doing a self-consciously evil take on Johnny Cash".

The album begins with an instrumental track with sounds of children's laughter and chanting. After this, the track "I Am The Sun" features Gira and Jarboe alternating on vocals over an instrumental with a "manic drive". The song features tempo changes and "careful" spaces of quiet between "blasts" of instrumentation.

Louder Sound's Dom Lawson describes the song "Celebrity Lifestyle" as a "weirdly catchy no-wave hoedown". Lyrically, the song features the topic of romanticization of celebrities.

The song "Killing For Company" is based on the crimes of the Scottish serial killer Dennis Nilsen, who claimed to have killed his victims due to loneliness. Dom Lawson described the song as "an object lesson in sonic unease", and, alongside "Celebrity Lifestyle", one of the band's "most devastating moments".

The song "Where Does A Body End?" has the same lyrics as the song "Where Does Your Body Begin?" from Drainland, linking the two "companion albums" together.

== Critical reception ==
Professional ratings
Review scores
Source	Rating
AllMusic	4/5 stars
Blurt	4/5 stars
Classic Rock	4/5 stars
CMJ New Music Monthly	favorable
The Line of Best Fit	9/10
New Noise Magazine	4.5/5 stars
Pitchfork	7.2/10
PopMatters	8/10 stars
Spectrum Culture	3.75/5
Spin Alternative Record Guide	7/10

The Great Annihilator received a generally positive reception from critics. AllMusic called the album "an epic, incredible work of art." Trouser Press, on the other hand, wrote that the album "reveals [...] that the band is running out of ideas", commenting that is "unlikely to satisfy long-term followers. A more accessible Swans may also be a less cathartic one."

== Track listing ==
All lyrics are written by Michael Gira; all music is composed by Gira, except tracks 8 and 16 (which are also composed by Jarboe).

No.	Title	Length
1.	"In"	2:27
2.	"I Am the Sun"	3:23
3.	"She Lives!"	7:00
4.	"Celebrity Lifestyle"	4:10
5.	"Mother/Father"	4:07
6.	"Blood Promise"	4:15
7.	"Mind/Body/Light/Sound"	4:52
8.	"My Buried Child"	2:58
9.	"Warm"	4:54
10.	"Alcohol the Seed"	3:29
11.	"Killing for Company"	6:55
12.	"Mother's Milk"	2:26
13.	"Where Does a Body End?"	3:42
14.	"Telepathy"	6:11
15.	"The Great Annihilator"	4:53
16.	"Out"	2:24
Total length:		68:06

2002 reissue bonus track
No.	Title	Length
17.	"I Am the Sun" (Live at the Flesh Club 1996)	5:48
Total length:		73:54

2017 remaster disc two, Drainland by Michael Gira
No.	Title	Length
17.	"You See Through Me"	5:41
18.	"Where Does Your Body Begin?"	3:04
19.	"I See Them All Lined Up"	4:13
20.	"Unreal"	4:48
21.	"Fan Letter"	7:01
22.	"Your Naked Body"	2:30
23.	"Low Life Form"	3:41
24.	"If You..."	4:41
25.	"Why I Ate My Wife"	5:53
26.	"Blind"	4:33
Total length:		46:05

== Personnel ==
Credits adapted from The Great Annihilator liner notes.

Swans

- Michael Gira – vocals, guitars, sounds, art design, production
- Jarboe – vocals, sounds, organ, keyboards
- Bill Rieflin – drums, percussion, sounds, additional sequencing
- Algis Kizys – bass
- Norman Westberg – guitar
- Clinton Steele – guitar

Additional musicians

- Ted Parsons – drums (tracks 3, 4, and 15)
- John Sarfell – piano (track 9)
- Nicky Skopelitis – guitar (track 9)

Technical personnel

- Martin Atkins – additional mastering, drums (tracks 8)
- Martin Bisi – engineering, mixing
- Bryce Goggin – engineering
- Larry Seven – engineering, double bass (track 16)
- Scott Ramsayer – engineering, additional sequencing
- Fred Breitberg – engineering
- Van Christie – engineering
- Jay O'Rourke – mastering
- Doug Henderson – remastering
- Jim Marcus – additional sequencing
- Mark Falls – layout
- Phil Puleo – artwork
