= Lary 7 =

American musician

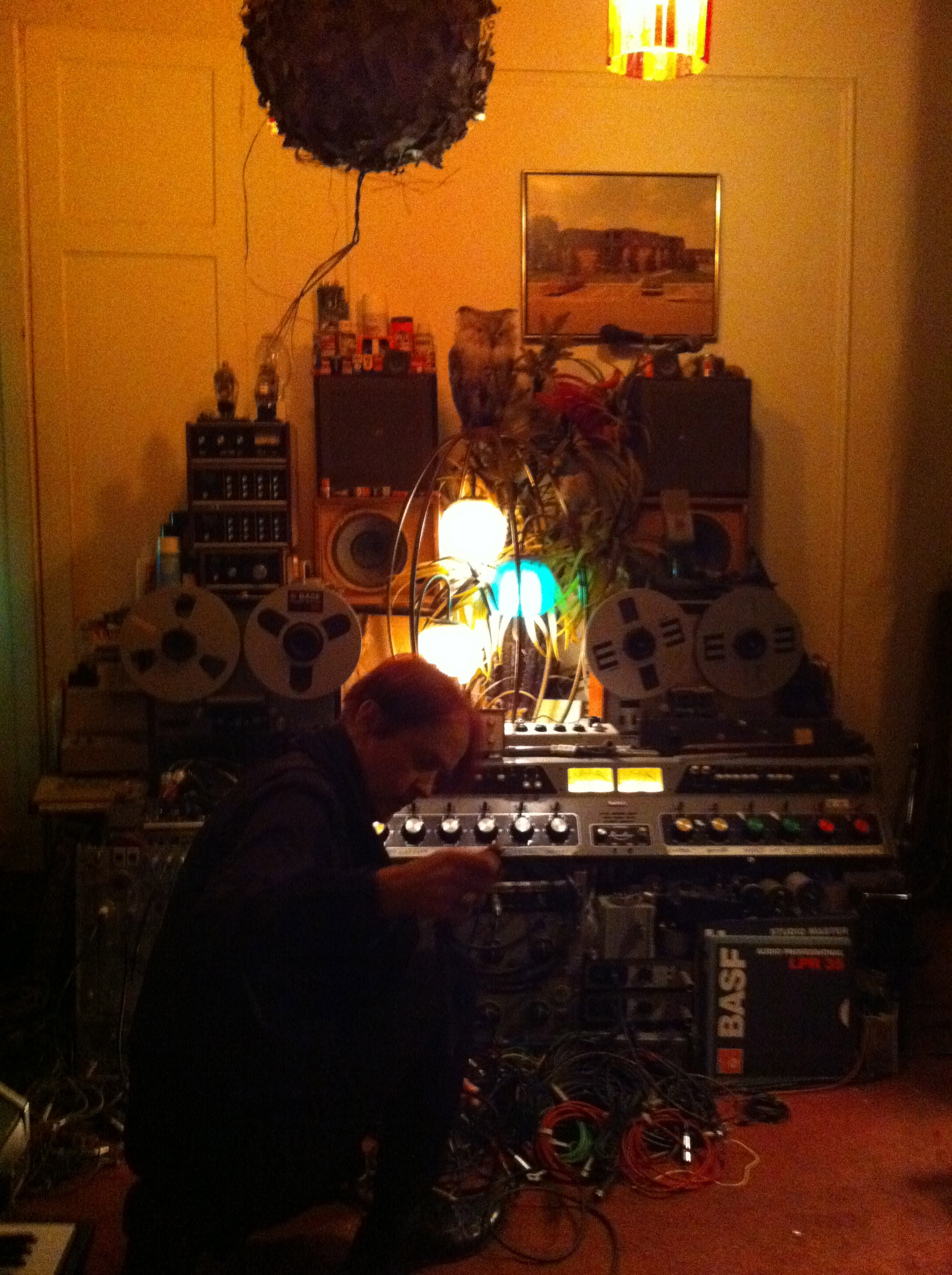
- Lary 7 in his New York City studio 2011. Photo by Carl Michael von Hausswolff.

Background information
- Born: April 17, 1956 (age 69); Buffalo, New York, U.S.
- Genres: Post-punk, Art Rock, Noise Music
- Occupations: Artist, musician, filmmaker
- Instruments: Bass guitar, guitar

Lary 7 (also known as Larry Seven or L7) is an American post-punk artist, sound artist, musician and filmmaker based in New York. He is the subject of the documentary Not Junk Yet - The Art of Lary 7, directed by Danielle de Picciotto. He has worked with artists such as Swans and Jarboe.

The film includes interviews with Lary and other musicians, along with archival footage, images and performances. De Picciotto directed the film herself, with sound production by her husband and collaborator, Einstürzende Neubauten member Alexander Hacke.

Lary 7 collaborated on Steven Parrino's 22 minutes long, black and white, super 16 mm film Necropolis (The Lucifer Crank) for Anger (2004), made in collaboration also with Amy Granat, that is in the collection of the Centre Pompidou in Paris.
