= Michael Gira =

American singer and musician

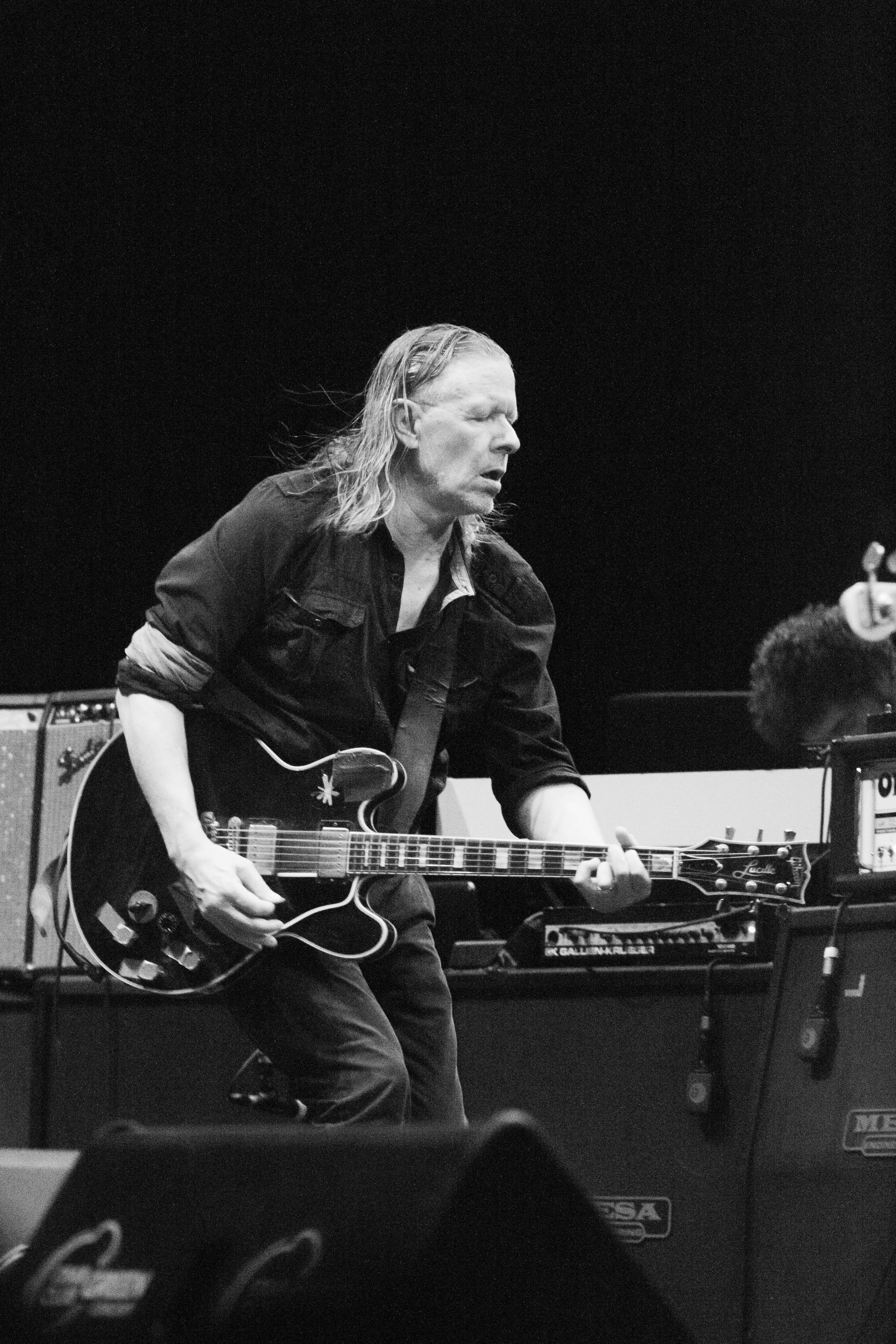
- Gira performing in Moscow, 2017

Background information
- Born: Michael Rolfe Gira; February 19, 1954 (age 72); Los Angeles, California, U.S.
- Genres: Noise rock; experimental rock; art rock; neofolk; post-rock
- Occupations: Singer-songwriter; musician; producer; author
- Instruments: Vocals; guitar; bass; keyboards
- Years active: 1979–present
- Labels: Young God; Uni/MCA; Caroline; Atavistic
- Member of: Swans
- Formerly of: Angels of Light; Circus Mort; The Body Lovers / The Body Haters; World of Skin
- Spouse(s): Siobhan Duffy (m. 1999; div. 2011) Jennifer Church (m. 2014)
- Website: younggodrecords.com

Michael Rolfe Gira (/dʒəˈrɑː/; born February 19, 1954) is an American singer-songwriter, composer, author and artist. Now based in New Mexico, he founded the band Swans, in which he sings and plays guitar, in New York City in the 1980s at the height of the no wave movement. He is also the founder of Young God Records and previously fronted Angels of Light.

== Early life ==
Michael Rolfe Gira was born February 19, 1954, in Los Angeles to Alice (née Shulte), originally from Iowa, and Robert Pierre Gira. His mother was an alcoholic, and Gira spent much of his early life caring for his younger brother. Gira has commented that his parents were "not around much" during his early childhood.

As an adolescent, Gira was arrested in California several times for petty crimes. Facing the risk of being incarcerated in a juvenile hall, he relocated with his father to Germany following a short stay in South Bend, Indiana. While in Germany, Gira ran away and hitchhiked across Europe, lived in Israel for a year, and spent four and a half months in an adult jail in Jerusalem for selling hashish. He turned 16 while in jail.

Returning to California around age seventeen, Gira worked at a bakery on Redondo Beach Pier, completed his GED, went to community college, and then attended Otis College of Art and Design in Los Angeles. He moved to New York in 1979, where he played in a band called Circus Mort, before forming the band Swans. In Manhattan, Gira found employment as a construction worker, doing demolition, sheetrock installation, and plastering.

== Career ==
=== Swans ===
Initially, Swans' focus was raw rhythm and abrasive textures, usually eschewing melody for visceral power, becoming known for their abrasive experimental and post-industrial sound. Their commercial success was limited, but Swans earned critical notice and had a devoted following.

The band's lineup and sound evolved over time, and their music became somewhat more conventional. A marked shift in Swans' music came with inclusion of Gira's partner, Jarboe, who added her ethereal voice and synthesizers to the group in 1985. Gira and Swans spent the next twelve years releasing studio, live, and side-project albums. Gira's frustration with various record labels grew over time, and he disbanded Swans in 1997.

However, in 2010, Gira decided to revive the band, with members new and old. They released a new album titled My Father Will Guide Me Up a Rope to the Sky. A second post-revival album, The Seer, was released in 2012. A third, To Be Kind, was released in 2014. All three were met with increasing critical acclaim. The Glowing Man followed and was released in 2016. Leaving Meaning followed in 2019, and then The Beggar in 2023. Their seventeenth studio album, Birthing, was released in 2025.

=== Solo career and Angels of Light ===
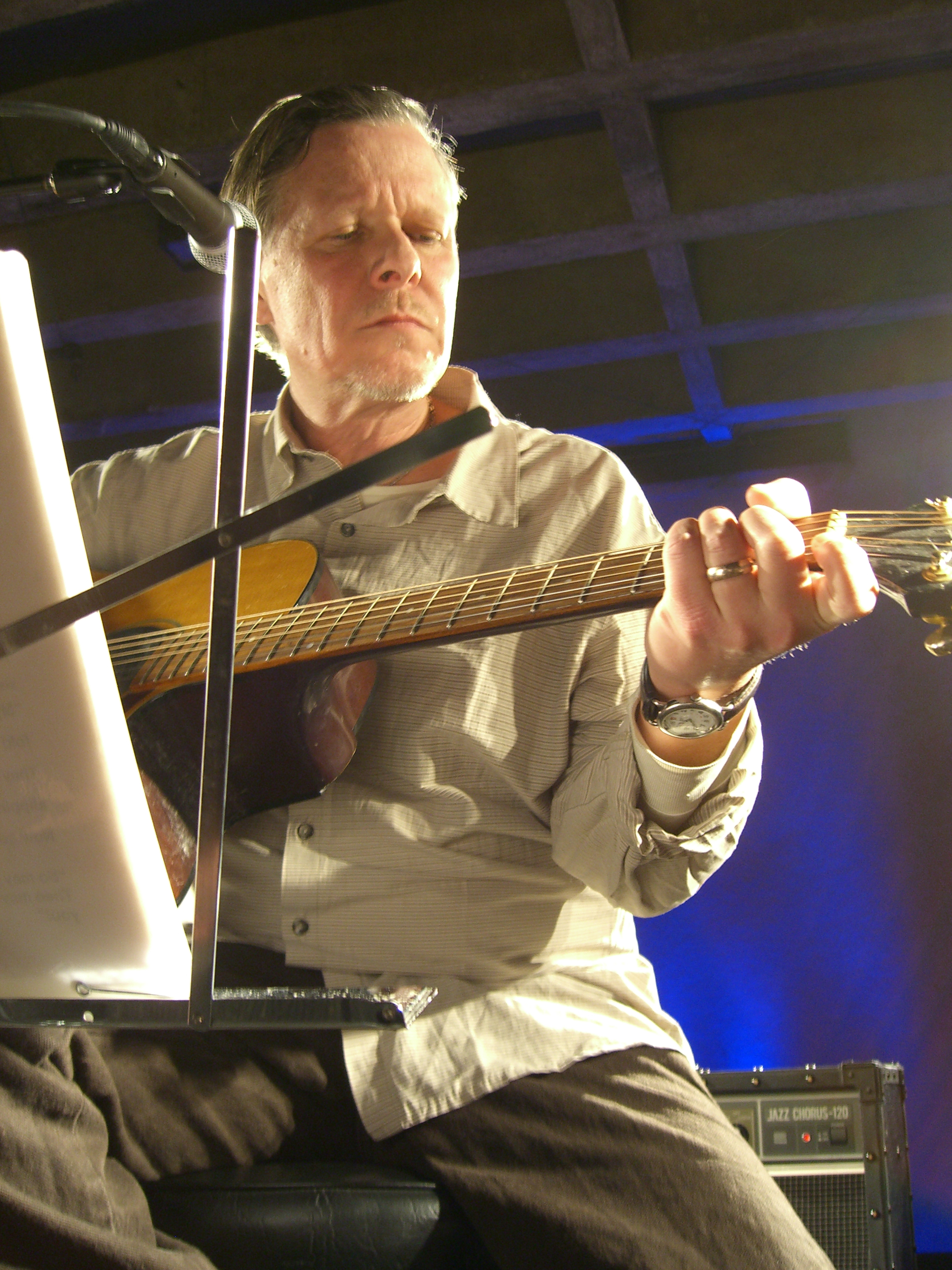
Michael Gira performing at The Doug Fir Lounge in Portland, Oregon on March 3, 2009

After dissolving Swans in 1997 Gira began a new musical direction with Angels of Light, which are a quieter, more acoustic-based group than Swans.

Gira also spent time experimenting with soundscapes, found sound, and loops with The Body Lovers / The Body Haters project. He has also released several albums under his own name including Drainland (1995), a spoken word album called The Somniloquist (2000), and What We Did (2001), a collaboration with Windsor for the Derby's frontman Dan Matz.

Gira founded his own record label, Young God Records, which has released albums from such artists as Devendra Banhart, Mi and L'au, and Akron/Family as well as Swans, The Angels of Light and The Body Lovers' back catalogues.

Akron/Family served as Gira's backing band during the recording of and touring for The Angels of Light's 2005 album, The Angels of Light Sing 'Other People'.

Gira has spoken of his decision to shift his focus from The Angels of Light back to Swans as a move based on impassivity. He has stated, "I had been doing this band Angels of Light for thirteen years, and had reached a kind of impassivity with that, sorta like I had reached an impassivity with Swans when I initially stopped it."

=== Writings ===
Gira's first short story collection The Consumer (ISBN 1-880985-26-8) was published in 1995 by Henry Rollins's 2.13.61 publications. It is divided into two parts, the first being "The Consumer", a series of short stories from the early 1990s, the second, "Various Traps, Some Weaknesses", made up mostly of prose-poems and vignettes, all dating from 1983 to 1986. (Many of these earlier stories had previously been published by SST Records as Selfishness, with illustrations by Raymond Pettibon.) In a Spike Magazine review of The Consumer And Other Stories, Jordon Leigh Bortle writes, "the squeamish may wish to armour themselves before entering these pages [...] Here, all taboos are annihilated — incest, alcoholism, obscene torture, rape, cannibalism, and perverse murder have all but become the norm in which these tragic tales occur."

In February 2018, Gira released his second short story collection, The Egg. Limited to 2,500 hand-signed copies, The Egg compiles seventeen stories written over 2016. Included with the release is a disc containing narrations of a handful of stories from The Egg as well as a few from The Consumer.

In 2022, Gira released a collection of Swans lyrics, stories, and journals titled The Knot, in a collector's edition of 3,000 hand-numbered copies. The Knot is 408 pages long, and additionally contains 101 color images. The Knot contains all of the lyrics from the first Swans EP to Leaving Meaning, as well as lyrics from Angels of Light and World of Skin, among Gira's other projects, and includes archived writings dating back to 1974.

== Personal life ==
Gira dated pop singer Madonna before she was famous. He was married to Gunga Din vocalist Siobhan Duffy from 1999 until their divorce in 2011. He has been married to Jennifer Church Gira since 2014.

In an interview with Pitchfork Media on 19 May 2014, when questioned about his musical influences over the years Gira noted it as being difficult to describe, but praised artists such as Nina Simone, James Brown, Fela Kuti, Can, and Led Zeppelin. Gira has also cited Suicide as an influence.

Gira listed his 13 favorite albums as On the Corner by Miles Davis, The Man-Machine by Kraftwerk, The Rise and Fall of Ziggy Stardust and the Spiders from Mars by David Bowie, 20 Jazz Funk Greats by Throbbing Gristle, the Stooges self-titled debut album, the Doors' Strange Days, Freak Out! by the Mothers of Invention, Pink Moon by Nick Drake, Symphonie No.2 by Henryk Górecki, Blood on the Tracks by Bob Dylan, Tabula Rasa by Arvo Part, The Chess Box by Howlin' Wolf, and Ummagumma by Pink Floyd.

Gira has stated that many of his songs were written by a voice that channels through him named "Joseph", which he says had stayed with him since his youth.

Gira has three children; two sons, one named Swan according to Children of God album cover photographer Laura Levine, and a daughter.

In February 2016, musician Larkin Grimm accused Gira of raping her in 2008, when they were working together on her album Parplar, released by his Young God Records label. According to Grimm's account, after a celebration following the album's completion, she invited Gira into her bed on the condition that he not touch her; she claims later that she awoke to find him attempting to have sex with her. Grimm said that Gira apologized, but that their relationship subsequently became strained. She also said that she was dropped from Young God Records after confronting him about the incident. Gira denied the allegation while acknowledging an intimate encounter, which he described as consensual and an "awkward mistake".

Unrelatedly, in a 1987 interview with Sounds, Gira discussed an incident in which he said he had been the perpetrator of a rape, as well as a separate incident in which he himself had been raped: "I don't want to talk about it. Suffice to say—when I was young drugs turned me into a zombie."

== Equipment ==
In 2006 issue of Tape Op, Gira said he is "pretty indifferent to gear" and uses anything that "sounds good" and has a "specific character".

Gira is known for using a Guild antique burst electro acoustic guitar, and a Roland JC-120 Jazz Chorus Guitar Amplifier during his solo concerts. With Swans, Gira has used a variety of instruments including Ovation acoustic guitars and a Westbury Track II bass guitar during early performances. During the Soundtracks for the Blind and Swans are Dead era, Gira can be seen with a Gibson Lucille, a Fender Telecaster and a Gibson Les Paul. Gira used Akai S900 sampler to make the major part of The Body Lovers and record all of the vocals on Drainland. He called it one of his favorite music tools.

== Discography ==
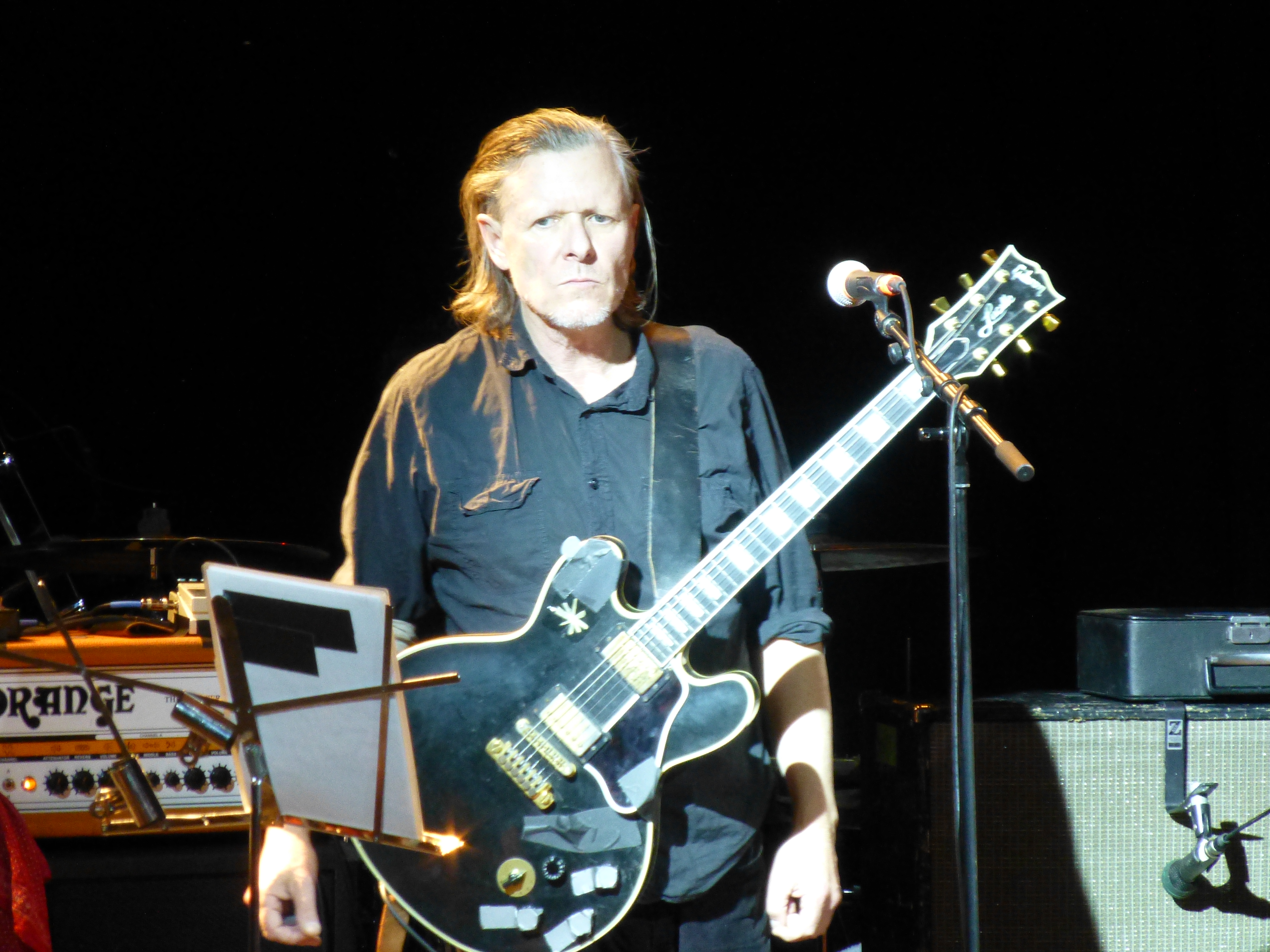
Michael Gira on stage at Stylus, Leeds University, 5 April 2013

Solo album

- Drainland (1995)

Collaborations

- Hard Rock (1984) – with Lydia Lunch
- A Diamond Hidden in the Mouth of a Corpse (1985) – with various artists
- Offenbarung und Untergang by Georg Trakl (1999) – with Étant Donnés
- What We Did (2001) – with Dan Matz
- Gantse Mishpuchah Music in Three Parts (2004) – with David Coulter, Jean-Marie Mathoul & Charlemagne Palestine

Live albums

- Jarboe Emergency Medical Fund (1999)
- Living '02 (2002)

Home recordings

- Solo Recordings at Home (2001)
- I Am Singing to You from My Room (2004)
- I Am Not Insane (2010)

Compilations

- Songs for a Dog (2006)
- The Milk of M. Gira: Selected Solo Home Recordings 2001–2010 (2011)
- I Am Not This (2016)

Spoken-Word albums

- The Somniloquist (2000)
- The Egg: Stories by Michael Gira (2018)

With Swans

- Filth (1983)
- Cop (1984)
- Greed (1986)
- Holy Money (1986)
- Children of God (1987)
- The Burning World (1989)
- White Light from the Mouth of Infinity (1991)
- Love of Life (1992)
- The Great Annihilator (1995)
- Soundtracks for the Blind (1996)
- My Father Will Guide Me up a Rope to the Sky (2010)
- The Seer (2012)
- To Be Kind (2014)
- The Glowing Man (2016)
- Leaving Meaning (2019)
- The Beggar (2023)
- Birthing (2025)

With Angels of Light

- New Mother (1999)
- How I Loved You (2001)
- Everything Is Good Here/Please Come Home (2003)
- The Angels of Light Sing 'Other People' (2005)
- Akron/Family & Angels of Light (2005) – with Akron/Family
- We Are Him (2007)

With World of Skin

- Blood, Women, Roses (1987)
- Shame, Humility, Revenge (1988)
- Ten Songs for Another World (1990)
