= Jarboe =

American musician

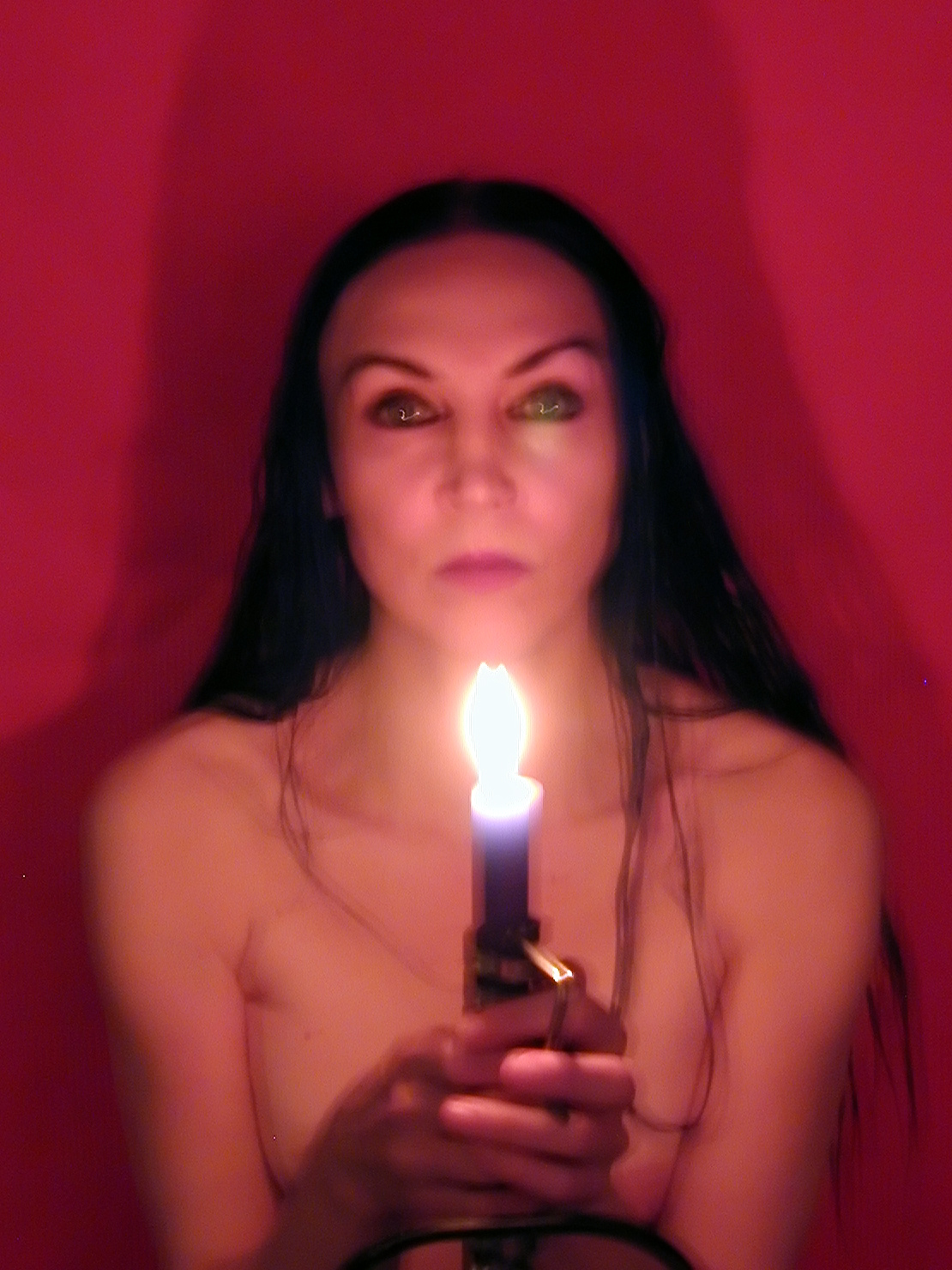

Background information
- Also known as: The Living Jarboe
- Born: Jane Jarboe Long; Mississippi, U.S.
- Origin: New Orleans, Louisiana, U.S.
- Genre: Experimental rock
- Occupations: Singer, musician, songwriter
- Instruments: Vocals; keyboards
- Years active: 1984–present
- Labels: Atavistic, Touch and Go Records, Revolver, Alternative Tentacles, Caroline, Neurot Recordings, The End Records, Season Of Mist
- Website: thelivingjarboe.com

Jarboe Devereaux, (known mononymously as Jarboe (/dʒɑːrˈboʊ/), is an American singer and musician who came to prominence as a member of the New York City experimental rock band Swans in 1985. Jarboe and Michael Gira, the founder of Swans, were the two constant members of the group until it broke up in 1997.

Although absent from the group's lineup when the band reformed in 2010, Jarboe contributed background vocals and voice collage for the band's 2012 album, The Seer. She has released numerous solo albums and collaborations, many of which have been self-published. She also co-composed the soundtrack of the 2009 psychological horror game The Path.

== Life and career ==
Jarboe was born in Mississippi and raised in the Southern United States, primarily in New Orleans and Atlanta, in a Roman Catholic Cajun family. Her father was a police detective who worked for the Federal Bureau of Investigation (FBI), and whom she has described as "the ultimate law-enforcement man". Both of her parents were employees of the FBI, and met through their jobs. In a 2015 interview, she revealed that her father died before she joined Swans, though she commented that her mother was "very interested in what I was doing."

As a child, Jarboe learned to play a Hammond organ, and studied opera at the insistence of her father, who hoped for her to have a career as a singer.

Jarboe described herself as "obsessed" with Swans since hearing their first album, Filth (1983). She came into contact with Michael Gira and attended the band's practice sessions before, after several auditions, joining as a vocalist and keyboardist and debuting on Greed (1986). Prior to Swans, Jarboe's musical background had consisted of training as a jazz and choral vocalist.

I had to unlearn proper singing technique and pronunciation. There is a tremendous difference between the vernacular of jazz and choral work and the way Michael Gira molded me. I think Michael Gira is the one who made me a "rock" singer. He told me, "Drop your g's." It's not "going to," it's "gonna." "Drop your consonants and relax." He said to me, "You're an American, sing like an American." He really ripped into my singing style and changed it around for me.

Between 1985 and 1997, she worked as a vocalist and keyboardist in the band, appearing on albums including Children of God (1987), The Burning World (1989), and Soundtracks for the Blind (1996). Jarboe's inclusion in the band marked a departure from their previous noise rock sound to a more melodic industrial and even folk rock sound. She also collaborated with Gira as a duo, forming their side project, The World of Skin in 1987, releasing several albums and singles. Her solo debut album, Thirteen Masks, was released in 1991.

Swans broke up in 1997. Jarboe continued her solo career, releasing various experimental records (many of which she has self-released and distributed over the internet) including Sacrificial Cake (1995) and Anhedoniac (1998). In 2003, she released a collaborative album with the experimental metal band Neurosis.

When Swans reformed in 2010, Jarboe was not a member of the group. However, she recorded vocals for two tracks as a special guest on their album The Seer (2012).

Jarboe completed a world tour in the autumn/winter of 2013, with Veil of Thorns' P. Emerson Williams on guitar. She released an experimental soundscape album, With Sun Falling, with Veil of Thorns in June 2015. In reflections on her solo work, particularly the six albums between 2017 and 2020, Jarboe said her participation in Tibetan Buddhism has been a persistent theme.

== Sources ==
- "Jarboe: The John Robb Interview" (Interview). Interviewed by John Robb. October 30, 2020. Archived from the original on October 31, 2020 – via YouTube.
