= Mesomorph Enduros =

Compilation album by Various artists
- Released: December 1992
- Recorded: 1989 - 1992
- Genre: Noise rock, post-hardcore, industrial rock
- Length: 58:06
- Label: Big Cat

Mesomorph Enduros is a various artists compilation album released in December 1992 by Big Cat Records. It was assembled by musician and composer J. G. Thirlwell, who had been asked by Big Cat to compile songs by his favorite underground American bands. The songs "Room 429", "Johnny Shiv" and "Blister" were recorded and made their debut specifically for the album's release. The album is dedicated to Unsane's former drummer Charlie Ondras, who had died in June.

== Track listing ==
No.	Title	Writer(s)	Artist	Length
1.	"Room 429"	Tod Ashley	Cop Shoot Cop	5:10
2.	"Vile"	Buzz Osborne	Melvins	3:48
3.	"Nub"	Duane Denison, Mac McNeilly, David Wm. Sims, David Yow	The Jesus Lizard	2:30
4.	"Louse"	Paul Erickson, Jeff Mooridian Jr., Paul Sanders	Hammerhead	2:05
5.	"Sister Sarah"	Helios Creed, Mark Duran, Rey Washam	Helios Creed	6:00
6.	"Pig Iron"	Kurt Danielson, Tad Doyle, Gary Thorstensen, Steve Wied	Tad	3:08
7.	"Incesticide"	J. G. Thirlwell	Foetus Inc	3:44
8.	"Nothing Solid"	Paul Bergmann, Mark Davies, Anne Eickelberg, Brian Hageman, Jay Paget, Hugh Swarts	Thinking Fellers Union Local 282	7:14
9.	"Candy"	John Brannon, Kevin Ries, Larissa Strickland, Todd Swalla	Laughing Hyenas	2:44
10.	"Hog Ditch"	Alex Barker, Steven Cerio, Julian Mills	Drunk Tank	2:34
11.	"Hands in Fire"	Scott Ayers, Bliss Blood	Pain Teens	2:20
12.	"The Reign"	Algis Kizys, Diane Wlezien	Of Cabbages and Kings	6:00
13.	"Johnny Shiv"	John Nowlin, Dave Sardy, Rock Savage	Barkmarket	3:08
14.	"Bath"	Charlie Ondras, Pete Shore, Chris Spencer	Unsane	2:58
15.	"Blister"	David Ouimet	Motherhead Bug	4:43

== Personnel ==
Adapted from the Mesomorph Enduros liner notes.

- Stephen "The Pizz" Pizzurro – cover art
- J. G. Thirlwell – compiling

== Release history ==
Region	Date	Label	Format	Catalog
United Kingdom	1992	Big Cat	CD, LP	ABB36
