= Dick Smoker Plus =

EP by Meathead and Cop Shoot Cop
- Released: September 24, 1996
- Recorded: May 1995
- Genre: Electro-industrial
- Length: 35:05
- Label: Fused Coil

Cop Shoot Cop chronology
Release (1994)	Dick Smoker Plus (1996)

Dick Smoker Plus is the debut split EP by Meathead and Cop Shoot Cop, released in September 24, 1996 by Fused Coil. The album comprises the first four tracks of Cop Shoot Cop and Meathead's Kill a Cop for Christ and Bring U His Head single and the last five tracks are from Meathead's Dick Smoker single. It also contains Cop Shoot Cop's final recording before disbanding, titled "¡Schweinhund!".

== Reception ==
Professional ratings
Review scores
Source	Rating
AllMusic	3/5 stars

Aiding & Abetting called Dick Smoker Plus "a wildly diverse set of tunes (two EPs and two creative bands will do that to you) that could probably have used some cohesion, but will suffice in its current form. Some wonderful noises going on." Tom Schulte of AllMusic awarded the album three out of five stars and said "the "Dick Smoker" mixes are anthemic; potent and memorable" and that the bands "mix it up and mix each other in powerful, hard industrial forays." The critic went on to say "If Ministry and Godflesh bore you – and you do not want to be bored again – do your homework on both Cop Shoot Cop and Meathead." Sonic Boom gave the album a mixed review, saying "Musically this EP is all over the place. It ranges from the very traditional guitar, drums, bass of CSC to club remixes almost totally devoid of a guitar" and "If you are either a CSC or Meathead completist you will want to pick up this EP which has tracks that appear nowhere else."

== Track listing ==
No.	Title	Artist	Length
1.	"Large American Jaw"	Meathead	3:17
2.	"¡Schweinhund!" (Remix by Cop Shoot Cop)	Cop Shoot Cop	2:42
3.	"¡Schweinhund!" (Remix by Meathead)	Cop Shoot Cop	3:57
4.	"Large American Jaw" (Remix by Cop Shoot Cop)	Meathead	4:04
5.	"Dick Smoker" (Wet mix)	Meathead	3:09
6.	"Outta My Face"	Meathead	7:34
7.	"Dick Smoker (So Full of Shit)"	Meathead	5:45
8.	"Loser" (Pussy Galore cover)	Meathead	2:39
9.	"Untitled"	Meathead	1:58

== Personnel ==
Adapted from the liner notes of Dick Smoker Plus.

Cop Shoot Cop

- Tod Ashley (Tod A.) – bass guitar
- Jim Coleman – sampler
- Jack Natz – bass guitar
- Phil Puleo – drums

Meathead

- Matteo Dainese – drums, percussion
- G.No – bass guitar
- Steve Nardini – sampler, backing vocals
- Mauro Teho Teardo – vocals, guitar, sampler, cover art, design

Production and design

- Zalman Fishman – executive-production

== Release history ==
Region	Date	Label	Format	Catalog
1996	United States	Fused Coil	CD	9868-63236
