= Zambodia =

Studio album by Motherhead Bug
- Released: October 15, 1993
- Recorded: 1992 – 1993
- Studio: BC Studio (Brooklyn, NY)
- Genre: Art rock, dark cabaret
- Length: 46:55
- Label: Pow Wow
- Producer: Martin Bisi

Zambodia is the only studio album by the American experimental music ensemble Motherhead Bug. It was released on October 15, 1993, by Pow Wow Records. The record is dedicated to Masami Shinoda, a Japanese alto-saxophonist and composer who died the year prior to its release.

== Background ==
After the release of Consumer Revolt and its coinciding tour, David Ouimet left Cop Shoot Cop to pursue his own musical ambitions. He formed Motherhead Bug along with Railroad Jerk bassist Tony Lee sometime during 1989. As the band developed and more musicians joined they began to release vinyl EPs. Their first official release Raised By Insects...Bugview was issued in 1991, featuring production by J. G. Thirlwell and an early version of the song "My Sweet Milstar". The next year the band released Age of Drawfs on PCP Entertainment, which contained "Bleating Heart Incident".

== Music ==
Motherhead Bug was known to incorporate elements of cabaret, big band, marching band, nursery rhymes, gypsy jazz, music hall, and even New York noise rock music into their work. Zambodia has been described as having a worldly and anarchistic sound, comparable to the French music group Les Négresses Vertes. David Ouimet has attributed his background in classical as well as his work in the New York underground as being influential to his music. Martin Bisi, who produced the album, has discussed the bands importance as the first rock ensemble to fully incorporate Eastern European influences into their music, preceding bands such as Gogol Bordello.

== Release and reception ==
The album is currently out of print, however it can be purchased in mp3 form from online stores such as amazon.com.

One Trouser Press critic described the album as follows: "The instrumentation and Ouimet's theatrical vocals lend a decadent grandeur to Weill-esque numbers like 'Demon Erection' and 'My Sweet Milstar.' It may be burlesque, but it's still pretty scary stuff."

== Track listing ==
All tracks are written by David Ouimet.

No.	Title	Length
1.	"My Sweet Milstar"	5:04
2.	"Tiny Bones"	3:17
3.	"Demon Erection"	6:32
4.	"Piñola"	4:00
5.	"Bleating Heart Incident"	6:06
6.	"Zambodia"	5:18
7.	"Leader = Dealer"	2:19
8.	"Shabooba"	4:13
9.	"The Sauce Carousel"	2:55
10.	"Blister"	4:44
11.	"Off With Their Little Heads!"	2:27

== Personnel ==
Adapted from the Zambodia liner notes.

Motherhead Bug

- Jez Aspinall – drums [mid], vocals (9)
- April Chung – violin, oboe
- Jim Colarusso – trumpet
- Julia Kent – cello
- Tony Lee – bass guitar, guitar (10), design
- Cyril Mazard – drums [low]
- Steve McMillen – guitar
- David Ouimet – vocals, trombone, illustrations
- Steve Ovenden – drums, percussion, backing vocals
- Joe Ben Plummer – saxophone
- Tomoyo T.L. – piano, gong, design

Additional musicians and production

- Michele Amar – backing vocals
- Martin Bisi – production, backing vocals
- Reilly Bones – glockenspiel (4, 11), xylophone (4, 11)
- Chris Gehringer – mastering
- Brenda Nasse – accordion (4)
- Adam Nodelman – bass (4)
- Murray Weinstock – accordion (4, 9)
- Norman Westberg – guitar (1, 2)

== Release history ==
Region	Date	Label	Format	Catalog
United States	October 15, 1993	Pow Wow	CD, CS	PWD 7443
