= Manhattan on the Rocks =

Compilation album by Various artists
- Released: 1992
- Genre: Alternative rock
- Length: 44:40
- Label: Pow Wow

Professional ratings
Review scores
Source	Rating
Allmusic	3/5 stars

Manhattan on the Rocks is a various artists compilation album released in 1992 by Pow Wow Records, consisting of music by bands based in New York. AllMusic awarded the compilation three out of five possible stars.

== Track listing ==
No.	Title	Writer(s)	Artist	Length
1.	"Half Asleep"	Gary Greenblatt, Phil Schuster	Stigmata a Go Go	4:03
2.	"The Way"	Rat at Rat R	Rat at Rat R	2:16
3.	"Tompkins Square Park"	Debra Desalvo, Dan Hoyt	False Prophets	4:03
4.	"Jukebox Misery"	Ism	Ism	3:14
5.	"My Sweet Milstar"	David Ouimet	Motherhead Bug	4:11
6.	"Dirt"	Virus	Virus	5:13
7.	"You're Alive"	Joshua Pearson, Gardner Post	Emergency Broadcast Network	3:29
8.	"Hair Removal System"	Debra Desalvo, Dan Hoyt, Keith Shepard	Lysdexic	4:15
9.	"Freddie & Me"	John Gill, Yanna Trance	Big Stick	3:17
10.	"I'm Your Venus (In Furs)"	Frederick J. Wagner	Black Car Nation	3:18
11.	"Stranger Girl"	Some Weird Sin	Some Weird Sin	4:41
12.	"Tough"	John Carlin, Tom Clapp, Justin Guip	700 Miles	2:40

== Personnel ==
Adapted from the Manhattan on the Rocks liner notes.

- Chris Gehringer – mastering
- Kaz – illustrations
- Carolyn Quan – design

== Release history ==
Region	Date	Label	Format	Catalog
United States	1992	Pow Wow	CD, CS	PWC 7428
