= Of Cabbages and Kings =

Of Cabbages and Kings may refer to

- Of Cabbages and Kings (album), 1967 album by English folk rock duo Chad & Jeremy
- Of Cabbages and Kings (band), an American noise rock band from Chicago, Illinois, formed in 1985
  - Of Cabbages and Kings (EP), 1987 eponymous EP

== See also ==
- Cabbages and Kings (disambiguation)
