= Drunk tank (disambiguation) =

A drunk tank is a jail cell or facility accommodating people who are intoxicated.

Drunk Tank also may refer to:

- Drunk Tank (band), a former Chicago noise rock group
  - Drunk Tank (album)
- (The) Drunk Tank, former name for the Rooster Teeth Podcast

== See also ==
- Dunk tank
