= White Noise (Cop Shoot Cop album) =

Studio album by Cop Shoot Cop
- Released: 1991
- Recorded: June 1991
- Studios: BC, Brooklyn, NY
- Genres: Noise rock; industrial rock
- Length: 39:58
- Label: Big Cat
- Producer: Martin Bisi

Cop Shoot Cop chronology
Consumer Revolt (1990)	White Noise (1991)	Suck City (1992)

White Noise is the second album by the American noise rock group Cop Shoot Cop, released in 1991 by Big Cat. The band supported the album with a North American tour.

== Critical reception ==
Professional ratings
Review scores
Source	Rating
AllMusic	3/5 stars

The Chicago Tribune wrote that "with two bass guitars, drums and a variety of taped sound effects, Cop Shoot Cop courts dissonance—'white noise'—without actually succumbing to it. Rather, 'white noise' might actually refer to the band itself, modern purveyors of the white-boy blues."

== Track listing ==
All lyrics are written by Tod Ashley, except "Feel Good" by Jack Natz.

No.	Title	Music	Length
1.	"Discount Rebellion"	Ashley	2:23
2.	"Traitor/Martyr"	Ashley, Coleman, Natz, Puleo	4:43
3.	"Coldest Day of the Year"	Ashley, Coleman, Natz, Puleo	4:57
4.	"Feel Good"	Ashley, Coleman, Natz, Puleo	3:21
5.	"Relief"	Ashley, Coleman	2:53
6.	"Empires Collapse"	Coleman, Puleo	2:58
7.	"Corporate Protopop"	Ashley, Thirlwell	1:19
8.	"Heads I Win, Tails You Lose"	Ashley, Coleman, Natz, Puleo	2:44
9.	"Chameleon Man"	Ashley	5:08
10.	"Where's the Money?"	Coleman	0:58
11.	"If Tomorrow Ever Comes"	Ashley	5:24
12.	"Hung Again"	Ashley	3:10

== Personnel ==
Adapted from the White Noise liner notes.

Cop Shoot Cop

- Tod Ashley – lead vocals, high-end bass guitar, guitar
- Jim Coleman – sampler, tape
- Jack Natz – low-end bass guitar, lead vocals (4)
- Phil Puleo – drums, percussion

Production and additional personnel

- Martin Bisi – production, recording, mixing (1–4, 7, 9, 11)
- Hugh Foley – spoken word (7)
- Killjoy – voice (6)
- Dave Sardy – mixing (9)
- Subvert Entertainment – cover art, design
- J. G. Thirlwell – mixing (5, 6, 8, 10, 12)

== Release history ==
Region	Date	Label	Format	Catalog
United Kingdom	1991	Big Cat	CD, CS, LP	ABB29
