= Suck City =

EP by Cop Shoot Cop
- Released: 1992
- Recorded: BC Studio, Brooklyn, NY
- Genre: Noise rock, industrial rock
- Length: 16:06
- Label: Big Cat/Interscope
- Producer: Martin Bisi

Cop Shoot Cop chronology
White Noise (1991)	Suck City (1992)	Ask Questions Later (1993)

Professional ratings
Review scores
Source	Rating
AllMusic	4/5 stars

Suck City is an EP by American noise rock group Cop Shoot Cop, released in 1992 by Big Cat Records and Interscope Records.

== Track listing ==
All lyrics are written by Tod Ashley.

No.	Title	Music	Length
1.	"Nowhere"	Ashley	4:37
2.	"Days Will Pass"	Ashley, Coleman, Natz, Puleo	4:01
3.	"We Shall Be Changed"	Ashley, Coleman	5:01
4.	"Suck City (Here We Come)"	Ashley, Coleman, Natz, Puleo	2:27

== Personnel ==
Adapted from the Suck City liner notes.

Cop Shoot Cop

- Tod Ashley – lead vocals, high-end bass guitar
- Jim Coleman – sampler, tape
- Jack Natz – low-end bass guitar
- Phil Puleo – drums, percussion

Production and additional personnel

- Cop Shoot Cop – mixing
- Martin Bisi – production, recording, mixing
- Subvert Entertainment – cover art, design

== Release history ==
Region	Date	Label	Format	Catalog
United Kingdom	1992	Big Cat	CD, CS, LP	ABB 39
United States	1992	Interscope	CD, LP	96116
