= The Hired Hand (picture book) =

1997 picture book by Robert D. San Souci

The Hired Hand: An African-American Folktale
- Author: Robert D. San Souci
- Illustrator: Jerry Pinkney
- Language: English
- Genre: Children's literature, picture book, African-American folktales
- Published: 1997 (Dial Books for Young Readers)
- Publication place: USA
- Media type: Print (hardback)
- Pages: 40 (unpaginated)
- ISBN: 9780803712966
- OCLC: 29258986

The Hired Hand: An African-American Folktale is a 1997 book by Robert D. San Souci and illustrator Jerry Pinkney based on an African American folktale about an itinerant worker who is able to rejuvenate and resurrect people.

== Reception ==
A review of The Hired Hand by Booklist wrote "He [Pinkney] successfully blends historically realistic details with timeless folkloric magic, and he enhances San Souci's smooth retelling in the process. An obvious choice for primary story hours, this will also make a welcome addition to African American folklore and history units.".

The Hired Hand has also been reviewed by Publishers Weekly, Kirkus Reviews, School Library Journal, and The Horn Book Magazine.

== Awards ==
- 1997 Aesop Prize - winner
- 1997 CCBC Choice
- 1997 Commonwealth Club of California Book Award: Juvenile - Silver
- 1997 New York Times Best Illustrated Books
