= PieceMan EP =

EP by Cop Shoot Cop
- Released: 1989
- Recorded: October 1988
- Studio: Fun City (New York City, NY)
- Genre: Noise rock, industrial rock
- Length: 11:23
- Label: Vertical
- Producer: Cop Shoot Cop

Cop Shoot Cop chronology
Headkick Facsimile (1989)	PieceMan EP (1989)	Consumer Revolt (1990)

PieceMan is an EP by American noise rock band Cop Shoot Cop, released in 1989 by Vertical Records. The record was limited to 1000 pressings. However, the songs "Disconnected 666" and "Eggs for Rib" would be rerecorded for Consumer Revolt while "Rbt. Tilton Handjob" would appear on the 1994 re-issue of Headkick Facsimile.

== Track listing ==
All tracks are written by Cop Shoot Cop.

Side one
No.	Title	Length
1.	"Rbt. Tilton Handjob"	3:29
2.	"Disconnected 666"	2:43

Side two
No.	Title	Length
1.	"Eggs for Rib (Speedway)"	5:11

== Personnel ==
Adapted from the PieceMan liner notes.

Cop Shoot Cop

- Tod Ashley – high-end bass guitar, lead vocals (A1)
- Jim Coleman – sampler (B1)
- Jack Natz – low-end bass guitar (B1), lead vocals (B1)
- David Ouimet – sampler
- Phil Puleo – drums, percussion

Production and additional personnel

- Cop Shoot Cop – production, mixing
- Subvert Entertainment – cover art, design
- Wharton Tiers – engineering, mixing

== Release history ==
Region	Date	Label	Format	Catalog
United States	1989	Vertical	LP	NR 18143
