= One Track Mind (Railroad Jerk album) =

Studio album by Railroad Jerk
- Released: 1995
- Recorded: 1994
- Studio: Tin Pan Alley
- Genre: Indie rock
- Length: 53:08
- Label: Matador
- Producer: Railroad Jerk, Settly

Railroad Jerk chronology
Raise the Plow (1992)	One Track Mind (1995)	The Third Rail (1996)

Professional ratings
Review scores
Source	Rating
AllMusic	3/5 stars
Austin Chronicle	3/5 stars
Christgau's Consumer Guide	(neither)
CMJ	(favorable)
Orlando Sentinel	5/5 stars
Spin	(favorable)

One Track Mind is an album by American indie rock band Railroad Jerk. It was released in 1995 on Matador Records.

== Track listing ==
1. Gun Problem – 3:56
2. Bang the Drum – 2:46
3. Rollerkoaster – 5:09
4. Riverboat (Vocals – Tony Lee) – 3:50
5. What Did You Expect? – 4:49
6. Home = Hang – 3:50
7. Forty Minutes – 4:28
8. The Ballad of Railroad Jerk – 5:29
9. Big White Lady (Vocals – Alec Stephen) – 2:39
10. Help Yourself – 4:25
11. You Better Go Now – 4:03
12. Some Girl Waved – 3:30
13. Zero Blues – 4:14

== Personnel ==
- Bass – Tony Lee
- Drums – Dave Varenka
- Engineer [Asst.] – Rob Polhemus
- Guitar – Alec Stephen
- Producer – Railroad Jerk
- Recorded By, Producer – Settly
- Vocals, Guitar – Marcellus Hall
