= Cabbages and Kings =

Cabbages and Kings is a quotation from "The Walrus and the Carpenter" (1871) and may refer to:

- Cabbages and Kings (novel), a 1904 novel by O. Henry
- Cabbages and Kings (Canadian TV program), a 1955 Canadian panel discussion television program which aired on CBC
- Cabbages and Kings (British TV series), a 1972–1974 British children's television series which aired on BBC1

== See also ==
- Of Cabbages and Kings (disambiguation)
