= The Third Rail (album) =

Studio album by Railroad Jerk
- Released: October 8, 1996
- Genre: Alternative rock, blues rock
- Length: 44:22
- Label: Matador
- Producer: Railroad Jerk, Settly

Railroad Jerk chronology
One Track Mind (1995)	The Third Rail (1996)

The Third Rail (sometimes also referred to as Third Rail) is the fourth and final studio album by New York City-based blues rock band Railroad Jerk, released on October 8, 1996, on Matador Records.

== Critical reception ==
Professional ratings
Review scores
Source	Rating
AllMusic	4/5 stars
The A.V. Club	(favorable)
Spin	7/10
The Stanford Daily	2/5 stars
The Village Voice	B+

Chris Nelson, of Addicted to Noise, ranked The Third Rail as his fourth favorite album of 1996. Writing in the Village Voice, Robert Christgau gave the album a B+ grade, writing that on it, the band's frontman Marcellus Hall "represents Manhattan art-slackerdom like the proud denizen he is." AllMusic's Stephen Thomas Erlewine wrote that "...much of the album rocks harder and better than any of their previous records."

== Track listing ==
1. Clean Shirt – 4:07
2. Objectify Me – 3:11
3. You Forgot – 3:48
4. Natalie – 4:20
5. You Bet – 4:32
6. Well – 4:45
7. Dusty Knuckle – 4:01
8. Middle Child – 3:13
9. This Is Not to Say I Still Miss You – 3:14
10. Another Nite at the Bar – 2:54
11. (I Can't Get) No Sleep – 3:47
12. Sweet Librarian – 1:57
13. Untitled – 0:33
