= Ukelin =

American bowed zither

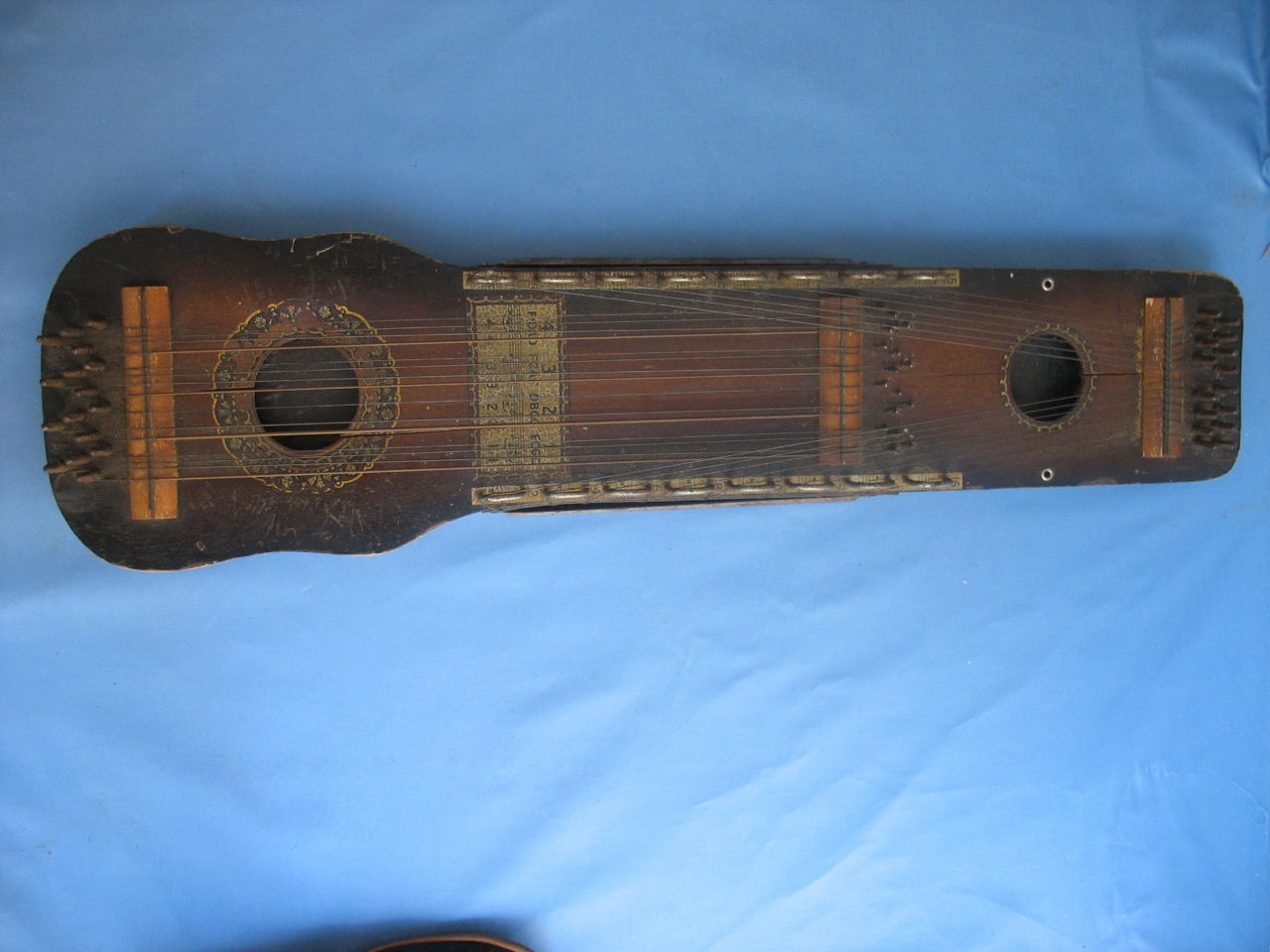
Ukelin, distributed by Manufacturers' Advertising Co. - front

The ukelin is a stringed musical instrument made popular in the United States in the 1920s. It is a bowed psaltery with zither strings, and its name derives from the ukulele and the violin -- it superficially resembles a ukulele but is played with a bow like the violin. The ukelin lost popularity prior to the 1970s because the instrument was difficult to play and was often returned to the manufacturer before customers made all installment payments.

== History ==
The history of the ukelin is hard to trace, since there were several instruments resembling the ukelin that were produced in the 1920s. Paul F. Richter filed the first known ukelin patent in December 1924; it was granted in April 1926. The Phonoharp Company, which merged with Oscar Schmidt, Inc. the same year, began producing ukelins in 1926. However, an instrument greatly resembling the ukelin had had its patent filed in 1923, a year before Richter filed his. Yet the patent, filed by John Large, was only granted after Richter's patent had already been given. Another similar instrument had a patent filed by Walter Schmidt in 1925. Because of these patents filed one after the other, it is unclear who invented the first ukelin.

Violinist Henry Charles Marx was one of the first to sell what he called a violin-uke, among many other instruments he created to be manufactured by his company, Marxochime Colony. He was thought to be the first to manufacture the instrument but soon had his design copied by International Music Company, which sold it under the name ukelin. The Phonoharp Company sold Richter's design before merging with Oscar Schmidt in 1926. Marxochime and Oscar Schmidt International, Inc. sold their instruments door-to-door through traveling salesmen, often to poor rural families. The salesmen would purchase the instruments from the company and then sell them at an inflated price, often on a payment plan. These prices increased as the economy grew stronger after the Depression. The customers were sometimes told that they were buying the instrument at a reduced price compared to a music store, but there is no evidence that they were sold in music stores. The instruments were usually sold for $35-$40.

== Playing ==
The ukelin has sixteen melody and sixteen bass strings, divided into four groups for playing accompanying chords. Each group has one large bass string and three smaller chord strings. The ukelin is placed on the table in front of the player. The melody strings are played with a bow in the right hand, and the bass strings are plucked or strummed with the left hand's fingernails or a pick. The ukelin is tuned to a C major scale and, unless tuned to include them, is unable to play chromatic notes; therefore, it is limited in what it can play. For ease of playing for amateurs, the strings are given numbers, and the booklets that were sold with the ukelin would give these numbers a tabulature notation, instead of notes on a staff, for playing simple songs.

== Decline ==
Ukelins were sold to people who thought that the instrument was easy to play, but this was not the case. They were also quite limited as to what they could play because they were designed as diatonic instruments. As a result, many instruments were returned to the manufacturers, who ended up with piles of instruments that they couldn't sell. Salesmen misrepresented the instruments to customers, who felt as if they had been tricked into buying a worthless instrument. Oscar Schmidt, Inc. stopped producing the ukelin in 1964 after the new owner, Glen Peterson, discovered the shady business practices of some of his salesmen. Between instrument returns and a declining interest in musical instruments due to the advent of television as a form of family entertainment, Marxochime could no longer produce the violin-uke and halted production in 1972.

== In popular music ==
The ukelin has occasionally been featured on recordings. Examples include Basic Pain Basic Pleasure (1990) by American noise rock band Of Cabbages and Kings, and All You Can Eat (1995) by Canadian singer k.d. lang.

== See also ==
- Marxophone
