= Consumer Revolt =

Studio album by Cop Shoot Cop
- Released: 1990
- Recorded: October 1988 – October 1989
- Studio: Various: BC Studio; (Brooklyn, NY); Fun City; (New York City, NY)
- Genre: Noise rock; industrial rock
- Length: 40:38
- Label: Circuit
- Producer: Martin Bisi, Cop Shoot Cop

Cop Shoot Cop chronology
PieceMan EP (1989)	Consumer Revolt (1990)	White Noise (1991)

Professional ratings
Review scores
Source	Rating
AllMusic	4/5 stars

Consumer Revolt is the debut studio album by American noise rock group Cop Shoot Cop, released in 1990 by Circuit Records.

== Track listing ==
All lyrics are written by Tod Ashley, except "Eggs for Rib" by Jack Natz.

No.	Title	Music	Length
1.	"Low.Com.Denom."	Ashley, Coleman, Natz, Ouimet, Puleo	2:22
2.	"She's Like a Shot"	Ashley, Coleman, Natz, Ouimet, Puleo	3:49
3.	"Waiting for the Punchline"	Ashley, Coleman, Natz, Ouimet, Puleo	3:48
4.	"Disconnected 666"	Ashley	2:17
5.	"Smash Retro!"	Ashley, Ouimet, Puleo	1:42
6.	"Burn Your Bridges"	Ashley, Coleman, Natz, Ouimet, Puleo	5:03
7.	"Consume"	Ashley, Natz, Ouimet	1:10
8.	"Fire in the Hole"	Ashley, Ouimet, Puleo	3:14
9.	"Pity the Bastard"	Ashley, Coleman, Natz, Ouimet, Puleo	4:11
10.	"Down Come the Mickey"	Ashley, Coleman, Natz, Ouimet, Puleo	3:41
11.	"Hurt Me Baby"	Ashley, Coleman, Natz, Ouimet, Puleo	1:31
12.	"System Test"	Ashley, Coleman, Natz, Ouimet, Puleo	2:33
13.	"Eggs for Rib"	Ashley, Coleman, Natz, Ouimet, Puleo	5:05

== Personnel ==
Adapted from the Consumer Revolt liner notes.

Cop Shoot Cop

- Tod Ashley – lead vocals, high-end bass guitar
- Jim Coleman – sampler
- Jack Natz – low-end bass guitar, lead vocals (5, 13)
- David Ouimet – sampler
- Phil Puleo – drums, percussion

Production and additional personnel

- Steve Ankler – lead vocals (11)
- Martin Bisi – production, mixing
- Cop Shoot Cop – production
- Subvert Entertainment – cover art, design
- Wharton Tiers – recording (5, 8), mixing (5, 8)

== Release history ==
Region	Date	Label	Format	Catalog
United States	1990	Circuit	CD, LP	005
United Kingdom	1992	Big Cat	CD, CS, LP	ABB 33
