= Delirium Tremens (Sulfur album) =

Studio album by Sulfur
- Released: June 16, 1998
- Recorded: Various: BC Studio; (Brooklyn, NY); Excello Recording; (Brooklyn, NY); Great Interface; (New York City, NY); Unique Recording; (New York City, NY)
- Length: 48:33
- Label: Goldenfly
- Producer: Michele Amar

Delirium Tremens is the only studio album by the American experimental music ensemble Sulfur, released on June 16, 1998, by Goldenfly Records. With French composer and vocalist Michele Amar acting as bandleader, the album includes performances by members of Firewater, Motherhead Bug, Soul Coughing and Swans.

== Reception ==
In writing for Ink 19, critic Kurt Channing criticized Delirium Tremens unclear tonal direction but claimed "Sulfur's distinguishing characteristics are its solid use of unusual instruments and Michele Amar’s vocal approach." A critic at babysue criticized the busy nature of some of the compositions but comparing the complex music somewhat favorably to early eighties progressive rock music.

== Track listing ==
No.	Title	Writer(s)	Length
1.	"Delirium I"	Amar, Ouimet	2:17
2.	"Undertowed"	Amar	3:57
3.	"Water Song"	Amar	3:46
4.	"Doctor Victor"	Amar	3:37
5.	"Delirium II"	Amar, Ouimet	1:15
6.	"Revolution"	Amar, Doherty, Heathen, Joeright, Paauwe, Westberg	3:17
7.	"Fantastic Shot"	Amar, Ouimet	3:18
8.	"Seeing Red"	Amar, Ouimet	4:30
9.	"Sister"	Amar	3:15
10.	"Delirium III"	Amar, Ouimet	0:41
11.	"Knuckles"	Amar, Doherty, Joeright, Paauwe, Westberg	3:03
12.	"Toads Flamenco"	Amar, Heathen	3:20
13.	"Ballad of Azalea"	Amar	3:50
14.	"Delirium IV"	Amar, Ouimet	0:45
15.	"Black Maria's Ride"	Amar	5:02
16.	"Nova Sangre"	Amar	2:40

== Personnel ==
Adapted from the Delirium Tremens liner notes.

Sulfur

- Michele Amar – vocals, musical saw, sampler, programming, keyboards (2, 9), production
- Tony Corsano – drums, percussion
- Fiona Doherty – bass guitar
- Nick Heathen – piano, sampler, recording
- Dan Joeright – drums
- David Ouimet – trombone, melodica, vocals, illustrations
- Heather Paauwe – violin
- Norman Westberg – guitar

Additional musicians

- Amir – flute (15)
- Neil Benzra – percussion
- April Chung – violin
- Jim Colarusso – trumpet

Additional musicians (cont.)

- Yuval Gabay – drums
- Paula Henderson – baritone saxophone
- Shoyo Iida – guitar (3, 9, 16)
- Tokie Koyama – bass guitar
- Paul Nowindski – upright bass
- Jojo Mayer – glockenspiel
- Yuri Zak – accordion (2)

Production and additional personnel

- Martin Bisi – recording
- Matt Hathaway – recording
- Ingo Krauss – mixing (2, 4, 6, 9, 15)
- Bryan Martin – recording
- Roli Mosimann – mixing (3, 7, 8, 11, 12, 13, 16)
- Howie Weinberg – mastering

== Release history ==
Region	Date	Label	Format	Catalog
United States	1998	Goldenfly	CD	GDF 1001
