= Ask Questions Later =

Studio album by Cop Shoot Cop
- Released: March 30, 1993
- Recorded: November 1992
- Studios: BC, Brooklyn, NY
- Genres: Noise rock; industrial rock
- Length: 50:11
- Label: Big Cat/Interscope
- Producers: Martin Bisi, Cop Shoot Cop

Cop Shoot Cop chronology
Suck City (1992)	Ask Questions Later (1993)	Release (1994)

Professional ratings
Review scores
Source	Rating
AllMusic	4.5/5 stars
Entertainment Weekly	B+
NME	4/5 stars

Ask Questions Later is the third album by American noise rock group Cop Shoot Cop, released on March 30, 1993, by Big Cat and Interscope Records.

== Track listing ==
All lyrics are written by Tod Ashley, except "Furnace" and "Cause and Effect" by Jack Natz.

No.	Title	Music	Length
1.	"Surprise, Surprise"	Jack Natz	4:58
2.	"Room 429"	Ashley	5:08
3.	"Nowhere"	Ashley	4:12
4.	"Migration"	Phil Puleo	1:26
5.	"Cut to the Chase"	Ashley	4:07
6.	"$10 Bill"	Ashley	3:45
7.	"Seattle"	Jim Coleman	1:38
8.	"Furnace"	Natz	4:59
9.	"Israeli Dig"	Coleman	2:11
10.	"Cause and Effect"	Natz	3:15
11.	"Got No Soul"	Ashley	5:16
12.	"Everybody Loves You (When You're Dead)"	Ashley	2:34
13.	"All the Clocks Are Broken"	Ashley	5:18
14.	"[untitled]"		2:12

== Accolades ==
Year	Publication	Country	Accolade	Rank
1993	Spex	Germany	"Albums of the Year"	7
1993	Magnet	United States	"Albums of the Year"	26
1996	Visions	Germany	"The Best Albums 1991-96"	*
2010	Ondarock	Italy	"Rock Milestones"	*
"*" denotes an unordered list.

== Personnel ==
Adapted from the Ask Questions Later liner notes.

Cop Shoot Cop

- Tod Ashley – lead vocals, high-end bass guitar, guitar (2), cymbal (6), bass drum (6), snare drum (6), whistle (6), sampler (11), percussion (11), mixing (2–8, 10–13)
- Jim Coleman – sampler, piano (12), mixing (9)
- Jack Natz – low-end bass guitar, lead vocals (8, 10), backing vocals (6, 11), radio (1), snare drum (6)
- Phil Puleo – drums, percussion, bass drum (6), snare drum (6)

Additional musicians

- April Chung – violin (5)
- Jim Colarusso – trumpet (6, 11)
- Killjoy – backing vocals (2)
- David Ouimet – trombone (6, 11), percussion (11)
- Joe Ben Plummer – saxophone (6, 11)

Production and additional personnel

- Martin Bisi – production, mixing (2–8, 10–13)
- Cop Shoot Cop – production
- Cheryl Dawn Dyer – cover art
- Roli Mosimann – mixing (1)
- Subvert Entertainment – design
- Howie Weinberg – mastering

== Release history ==
Region	Date	Label	Format	Catalog
United Kingdom	1993	Big Cat	CD, LP	ABB 45
United States	1993	Interscope	CD, CS	92250
United States	2014	Cleopatra	LP	1879
