= Human Impact =

American Noise Supergroup

- Origin: New York City, New York, USA
- Genres: Industrial metal; Noise rock
- Years active: 2019–present
- Labels: Ipecac
- Members: Chris Spencer; Jim Coleman; Jon Syverson; Eric Cooper
- Past members: Phil Puleo; Chris Pravdica
- Website: humanimpact.bandcamp.com

Human Impact are an American noise rock supergroup made up of members from Unsane, Swans, Cop Shoot Cop, Daughters, and Made Out of Babies. Chris Spencer announced the band while also confirming that he will no longer be playing with Unsane. The band released their self titled debut album on March 13, 2020. This was followed by the non-album single "Contact" on April 7. The proceeds from the single went to the New York City COVID-19 emergency relief fund. On June 29, they released a further two singles, "Transist" and "Subversion".

== History ==
Unsane and Cop Shoot Cop both formed in the late 1980s hardcore scene in New York City. During this time, Jim Coleman (CSC's keyboardist) and Chris Spencer (Unsane's vocalist and guitarist) developed a close friendship. Both bands became influential to noise rock, however it wasn't until 2018 that the two discussed forming a band. Chris Spencer commented:

Jim approached me about a year ago and asked if I would want to do something together. Jim and I had been friends since the early days of Unsane and Cop Shoot Cop and I had always wanted to do something with him, so of course I was in.

Drummer Phil Puleo and bassist Chris Pravdica joined later on. Puleo had played in CSC with Coleman, and in Swans with Pravdica.

== Members ==
Current

- Chris Spencer – guitar, vocals (2019–present)
- Jim Coleman – electronics (2019–present)
- Jon Syverson – drums (2024–present)
- Eric Cooper – bass (2024–present)

Former

- Phil Puleo – drums (2020–2024)
- Chris Pravdica – bass (2020–2024)

== Discography ==
=== Studio albums ===
- Human Impact (Ipecac) - 2020
- EP01 (Ipecac) - 2021
- Gone Dark (Ipecac) - 2024
