= Motherhead Bug =

US musical group

Background information
- Origin: New York City, New York, U.S.
- Genres: Gypsy punk, folk punk
- Years active: 1989–1993
- Labels: Lungcast Records, PCP Entertainment, Pow Wow Records
- Past members: Jez Aspinall; Kit Krash; April Chung; Jim Colarusso; Julia Kent; Tony Lee; Cyril Mazard; Steve McMillen; David Ouimet; Steve Ovenden; Joe Ben Plummer; Tomoyo T.L.

Motherhead Bug was an American folk punk band, founded in 1989 in New York City by singer and trombone player David Ouimet and bass guitarist Tony Lee.

== Band history ==
Ouimet had earlier founded industrial rock group Cop Shoot Cop, and Lee was a member of blues rockers Railroad Jerk.

The group was rather large, featuring three drummers, as well as string and horn sections, with accordions, xylophones and other unusual instruments featured prominently. The music is somewhat similar to Tom Waits' post-Swordfishtrombones, but also touched on music hall songs, nursery rhymes, marching bands, and earned comparisons to the Penguin Cafe Orchestra.

Motherhead Bug released only two singles and one full-length album, 1993's Zambodia, recorded by Brooklyn-based producer Martin Bisi. The album was dedicated to saxophonist Masami Shinoda. One critic described Zambodia as follows: "The instrumentation and Ouimet's theatrical vocals lend a decadent grandeur to Weill-esque numbers like 'Demon Erection' and 'My Sweet Milstar.' It may be burlesque, but it's still pretty scary stuff."

== Aftermath ==
The project was abandoned after Zambodia's release due to the inability to manage so many band members. Ouimet stopped writing music and focused on working on children's books, although he would occasionally appear as a guest musician. He would not work as a full-time member of a band until the release of Firewater's Get Off the Cross... album in 1996. Michele Amar's similar musical project, Sulfur, released Delirium Tremens in 1998 which was co-written by Ouimet and featured some of the same musicians that performed on Zambodia.

== Discography ==
=== Studio albums ===
Date	Title	Label
1993	Zambodia	Pow Wow Records

=== Singles ===
Date	Title	Label
1991	Raised By Insects...Bugview	Lungcast
1992	"Age of Dwarfs"	PCP Records

=== Compilation appearances ===
Date	Title	Track	Label
1992	Mesomorph Enduros	"Blister"	Big Cat
1992	Manhattan on the Rocks	"My Sweet Milstar"	Pow Wow Records
