= Jack Natz =

American bass guitarist and vocalist

- Birth name: William C. Nantz
- Genres: Noise rock, industrial rock, post-punk
- Occupation: Musician
- Instrument(s): Bass guitar, vocals
- Years active: 1987–present
- Labels: Big Cat, Circuit, Interscope
- Website: jacknantz.com

Jack Natz is an American bass guitarist and vocalist best known as the original bassist of The Undead and a member of the noise rock group Cop Shoot Cop. He has also acted in independent cinema, such as in the 1987 film Submit to Me Now. In 2003, he joined Lubricated Goat, led by musician and composer Stu Spasm, and recorded and toured with them. He lives in Brooklyn, with his attention focused on creating collages, paintings and found object sculptures.

== Biography ==
Jack Natz began his foray into music when he and Bobby Steele started the Skabs in 1978. At the time, Bobby was the guitarist for legendary horror punk band The Misfits. Bobby and Natz would jam with drummer Rich Matalian on the weekends when The Misfits weren’t doing anything. When Bobby was ejected from the Misfits in 1980, he decided he would take The Skabs full-time. Replacing drummer Rich Matalian with Patrick Blanck, and changing the name of The Skabs to The Undead. The trio of Steele, Natz, and Blanck played their first show at the Legendary A7 in January 1981. The group became one of the biggest bands in the emerging NYHC scene. They recorded the I Want You Dead demo in 1981, but then re-recorded the songs for 9 Toes Later, which Misfits singer Glenn Danzig put the money up for. The group opened for bands such as the Dead Kennedys and the Bad Brains. In 1982, Natz and Patrick Blanck left The Undead. Leaving Steele to replace them with various members throughout the years. Natz formed the Black Snakes in 1987. They released one album, Crawl, in 1988 before disbanding. In 1989, he joined what was then the three-piece ensemble Cop Shoot Cop to record "Eggs for Rib (Speedway)" for the PieceMan EP, on which he performed lead vocals. He became a full-time member of the band and remained with them until the group disbanded when lead vocalist Tod Ashley formed his own group Firewater. The remaining members formed the short-lived Red Expendables with Natz as the principal vocalist and songwriter.

== Discography ==
Year	Artist	Album	Label
1988	Black Snakes	Crawl	Radium 226.05
1989	Cop Shoot Cop	PieceMan EP	Vertical
1990	Cop Shoot Cop	Consumer Revolt	Circuit
1991	Cop Shoot Cop	White Noise	Big Cat
1992	Cop Shoot Cop	Suck City	Big Cat
1993	Cop Shoot Cop	Ask Questions Later	Interscope
1994	Cop Shoot Cop	Release	Interscope
1997	Red Expendables	Red Expendables	Grimm Werks
2003	Lubricated Goat	The Great Old Ones	Reptilian
