= Drunk Tank (band) =

American noise rock group

- Origin: Chicago, Illinois, United States
- Genres: Noise rock, post-hardcore
- Years active: 1989–1992
- Labels: Radial
- Members: Alex Barker; Steven Cerio; Lou Ciccotelli; Julian Mills

Drunk Tank was a noise rock group formed in Chicago, Illinois and active between 1989 and 1992. Although the band was short lived, their few releases garnered them favorable reviews. The band's earliest incarnation featured drummer and percussionist Lou Ciccotelli, who would become recognized for his involvement in God, Laika and Ice.

== History ==
Drunk Tank was formed in 1989 by guitarist Alex Barker, drummer Lou Ciccotelli and vocalist/bassist Julian Mills. Released in September of that year, the band's debut single Leadfoot/Sclssors was produced and recorded by Big Black front-man Steve Albini and described by Maximumrocknroll as "throbbing, loud post-hardcore" as well as "good post-earthquake music." Hayride With Mary Worth was released in December with continued involvement from Albini. The band relocated to New York City and graphic artist Steven Cerio replaced Lou Ciccotelli, who moved to London and began performing with Kevin Martin.

The band released their first full-length album in 1991, which earned them comparisons to The Jesus Lizard, Rapeman, King Snake Roost. They opened for Hole (band) at Maxwell's in Hoboken NJ in 1991 and opened for The Ex (band) at CBGB in NYC in 1992. Critical success seemed suggested major label interest was imminent and the band traveled London and headlined a sold-out show at the Borderline club. While in London, the band recorded four songs for John Peel at The Peel Sessions on BBC Radio 1 on Aug 18, 1992. The Missing EP was recorded in November 1992 but released posthumously in 1995, after Drunk Tank had disbanded.

Julian Mills went on to form Dirty Old Man River in 1996 and Steven Cerio became involved in Sonisk Blodbad.

== Discography ==
Albums

- Drunk Tank (Radial, 1991)

EPs

- Missing (Radial, 1995)

Singles

- Leadfoot/Scissors (Radial, 1989)
- Hayride With Mary Worth (Radial, 1989)

Compilation appearances

- Mesomorph Enduros (Big Cat, 1992)
