= The First Line (album) =

Studio album by Marcellus Hall
- Released: February 2011
- Genre: Garage Folk
- Length: 48:49
- Label: Glacial Pace
- Producer: Marcellus Hall

Marcellus Hall chronology
| More 4 Track Recordings (1996) | The First Line (2011) | Afterglow (2013) |

Professional ratings
Review scores
| Source | Rating |
|---|---|
| Now | 5/5 stars |

The First Line is an album by Marcellus Hall. It is his first full-length album and was released by Glacial Pace in 2011. The album, which includes a booklet of drawings by Marcellus, has been compared to the likes of Robyn Hitchcock.

== Critical reception ==
Exclaim! wrote: "Like many dusty blues punks before him it's the mantle of Dylan that Hall has chosen as armour, at least in terms of sound, though it's the sweetly poisoned inkwell of Jonathan Richman or Robyn Hitchcock from which his lyrics flow." The Observer wrote that "Hall lets the sounds of his city seep into the recordings; the tracks sound simultaneously organic and artificially distressed."

== Track listing ==
| No. | Title | Writer(s) | Length |
|---|---|---|---|
| 1. | "The First Line" | Marcellus Hall |
| 2. | "Star Position" | Marcellus Hall |
| 3. | "Neon, Not The Night" |
| 4. | "Laughing With You" | Marcellus Hall |
| 5. | "It's My Life" | Marcellus Hall |
| 6. | "Don't Go" |
| 7. | "During The War" |
| 8. | "One Drop Of Rain" | Marcellus Hall |
| 9. | "Back Where I Started" |
| 10. | "Broken Phone" | Marcellus Hall |
| 11. | "When You Can" |
| 12. | "Wishing My Heart Was Stone" | Marcellus Hall |
| 13. | "One Of Us" |
