= Dare to Be Scared =

Book by Robert D. San Souci

- First edition
- Author: Robert D. San Souci
- Illustrator: David Ouimet
- Language: English
- Genre: Children's, horror short stories
- Publisher: Cricket Books
- Publication date: 2003
- Publication place: United States
- Media type: Print (paperback)
- Pages: 159 pp
- ISBN: 0-8126-2688-5
- OCLC: 51178131
- LC Class: PZ7.S1947 Dar 2003
- Followed by: Double-Dare to be Scared

Dare to Be Scared: Thirteen Stories to Chill and Thrill is a 2003 children's horror short story collection by Robert D. San Souci and illustrated by David Ouimet, consisting of thirteen stories. It is the first book in the Dare to be Scared series, which consists of four books.

== Stories ==
=== 1. Nighttown ===
It is about a "dream" where a boy named Sammy is on vacation and is looking for the hotel he's staying at and finds vampires. Then he gets to the hotel and wakes his parents up and tells them, and they say, "Were they as big as these?" And they flash their giant teeth, revealing that they are vampires too. Sammy starts running and he felt that they were chasing after him and that he never woke up.

=== 2. The Dark, Dark House ===
After being dared by his friends, a boy named Peter must go in a creepy, supposedly haunted house and write his name on a chalkboard to prove he was there. As he is in the house, he hears strange noises. A werewolf touches his shoulder then chases Peter out of the house and all the way to his own house, with the last lines (which is the wolf man's) being, "What's the matter? Don't you like me?"

=== 3. The Caller ===
A girl named Lindsay has a beautiful ring given by her Aunt Margaret, who died. Lindsay had pretended to like her Aunt because she only wanted her ring. Lindsay's father loses his cell phone while at the funeral. When Lindsay gets a call from an unknown caller, who says it's her Aunt Margaret, Lindsay tells the caller she never liked her, just wanted her ring, then hangs up. While Lindsay's at her friend's house, Missy, she gets another call from her Aunt Margaret who says she's coming back to get her ring. This time the call was from her father's number, she guessed it was her little brothers trying to mess with her. When Lindsay hears footsteps behind a door, she thinks it's Margaret. While the door is still closed, Missy says she's on the other side, laughing at Lindsay. Mad at Missy, Lindsay opened the door, but it wasn't Missy who was clenching a phone covered in mud.

=== 4. The Double-Dare ===
Four boys have their own club and they run through woods everyday that are supposedly filled with evil spirits. A boy named Greg hangs with them a lot, but the boys only like him for his computer games. Against his will, they make him run through the woods, but while he's running through, sap is spread on him and he's transformed into a terrible tree monster. Upset, he finds the four boys, and spreads sap on them also.

=== 5. Space Is the Place ===
In Mark's town, weird lights have appeared in the sky, believed to be aliens. Mark's mother wants to leave the town, against Mark's wishes. They arrive at the bus station to leave. The bus was supposed to arrive in five minutes but instead Mark and his mom wait for one hour. Finally, it arrives. Surprisingly, the bus was new with a fresh coat of paint, unlike the other buses. The driver was hidden in a compartment. The inside of the bus is shiny, comfortable and new. Mark's mom is delighted. They soon take off. The ride begins smoothly and comfortably, but then the passengers complain that the bus has passed their intended destination. Then the bus rises into the sky. They soon panic as they find out the driver is an alien and they are in a UFO.

=== 6. Ants ===
Kyle lies to his mom, saying that he's going to see a Disney movie, when he's going to see a horror film called Jungle Jaws of Death, about killer ants. At the theater, while watching the previews, a horror movie called Frightmaster is coming soon and it's about things that crawl out of your nightmares and come to life. After watching the movie and going home, Kyle begins to feel and see killer ants everywhere. While in bed, killer ants crawl to him. Scared and shaky, the Frightmaster is in Kyle's head and says, "They're just figments of your imagination, like me. But, then, you always did have too much imagination".

=== 7. The Halloween Spirit ===
A girl named Keesha is forced by her mother to take her younger sister, Jonelle, trick-or-treating on Halloween. Keesha's friends are all at the park, Keesha's desired destination, however Jonelle insists that their mother restricted the two girls from going. Keesha defies their mother's wishes and drags a reluctant Jonelle along with her. Jonelle doesn't want to stay at the park, while Keesha does. Jonelle runs back home to tell on Keesha. Keesha and her friends begin to pay attention to a girl named Cassandra, who calls for a spirit to come. No one believes in ghosts and spectral beings, making Cassandra angry. Cassandra's attempt at summoning a ghost seems to have worked, until it is revealed that Jonelle is the "ghost". As Keesha takes Jonelle home, the younger girl doesn't speak as if she doesn't exist, confusing Keesha. When they arrive home, Keesha's mother is furious at her for going to the park and Keesha sees Jonelle sitting at a table and is confused when she looks back at the girl next to her. The girl with Keesha transforms into a genuine witch who takes Keesha up into the sky and spins her around until she falls down to Earth in pieces.

=== 8. The Bald Mountain Monster ===
Three kids, Nick, Sarah, and Angel are on a trip with their parents to explore interesting mountains. The kids meet a man who tells a legend of a strange winged creature who flies to children and eats them. If anyone gets in the creature's shadow, bad luck comes to them. Sarah goes off into a cave and gets trapped. Nick goes after her and then they both end up stuck. They see the winged creature in there, which turns out to be a pterosaur, and are chased by it. Finally getting out of the cave, they take Nick's dad's camera tripod and use it as a lever to push boulders on the creature, scaring it away. They tell Angel and their parents what happened, but only Angel believes them, until the creature's shadow flies over everyone.

=== 9. Playland ===
Alec loves the amusement park Playland, but it's about to be replaced by a new one. His favorite ride is the haunted house. He makes a wish that Playland would never go away and that he could ride the haunted house again and again. Alec goes to Playland one more time with his friend, Brian. They visit the automaton wish witch and Alec asks if the wish would come true. The wish witch promises it would. Then, Alec and Brian ride the haunted house. When riding the haunted house, it was supposed to stop but it didn't. Then, Brian falls off of the ride and gets crushed to death. Alec tried getting the ride operator's attention, but he was busy chatting. The ride goes faster, faster and faster. Alec is dizzy, as his head swings loosely on his neck, as if it were about to fall off. He can't get out of the cart and the ride goes on and on, never stopping, just as he had wished for.

=== 10. Smoke ===
Katie's parents die in a house fire. She wakes up from another dream about it in her grandparents home. Her memory is blurry. She asks her grandparents if she can go back to the house and find their ghosts, to say she loved them since the last thing she said to them was that she hated them, because they wouldn't let her spend the night at a friend's house. Her grandparents refuse. Katie then sneaks out of the house and goes to her old house. There is a heavy scent of burnt roses. She finds her parents' ghosts, who tell her they are staying in town with another couple. She tells them she loves them and they spend a sad and touching moment. Her grandparents arrive, greeting them. Her memory becomes clear and she remembers that her grandfather died before she was born, and her grandmother died when she was 6. Her parents tell her they are glad that she is being taken care of by them. The three are enveloped in a glowing yellow light, and leave to what her grandmother refers to as "the blessed place". Her parents walk back to their car, revealing they survived the fire, and Katie was the ghost.

=== 11. Mrs. Moonlight (Senora Claro de Luna) ===
A spoiled Spanish girl named Maria Luisa is staying with her grandmother while her mother is on business. She breaks things and blames it on anything but herself, when she knows she did it. Her grandmother tells her if she continues to be bad, a spirit called Mrs. Moonlight will come and take her away to the moon, which is what she does with all bad children, where they must polish her silverware for eternity. Maria Luisa doesn't believe her, and calls her mother to come get her. Later that night Maria Luisa wakes up, hungry after refusing to eat dinner, and notices odd phenomena, such as a hissing coming from the moonlight streaming through the window, and dust motes swirling through the air. These gradually take the shape of Mrs. Moonlight, who attempts to coax Maria Luisa out of the shadows, waiting for the changing moonlight to reveal her. Eventually, Maria Luisa calls for her grandmother, who turns on the light causing Mrs. Moonlight to disappear. Attempting to reassure the frightened girl, who she takes was sleepwalking, she turns out the light again, causing Mrs. Moonlight to reappear and drag Maria Luisa away.

=== 12. Hungry Ghosts ===
A boy named Michael and his uncle visit a whole bunch of paintings that were about Michael's ancestors who were tortured and starved to death because of the government. Michael then begins to feel their pain, literally. While on a boat, going home, Michael's soul flies out of his body and is replaced with his ancestor's, whose hunger is no more.

=== 13. Bakotahl ===
Marty and his friends Wayne, Mojo, and Connor chase an Indian boy off a cliff. When the boy lands on the ground and dies, Marty tells his friend to ignore the situation. The boy's twin brother whispers the word "Bakotahl" to Marty. Bakotahl was a spirit that caused bad things to happen to people who did bad things. After school, an earthquake happens causing Wayne to fall off a cliff, dying. Mojo believes Bakotahl killed Wayne. Marty and Connor don't believe him. That night, Connor calls Marty telling him Mojo died in a sand storm when an RV crashed into the car he was in with his parents. Connor comes over to Marty's and they break into a fight, since Connor wanted to tell the truth about what they did to the boy. After the boys quit fighting, a flash flood occurs. The floodwaters then push over a huge statue of the Bakotahl, which Marty's dad was working on, and kills them.

== See also ==
- Robert D. San Souci
- Short & Shivery
- Yearling Books
