= Of Cabbages and Kings (band) =

American punk/noise rock band

- Origin: Chicago, Illinois, USA
- Genres: Punk rock Noise rock
- Years active: 1985–1992
- Labels: Purge/Sound, Triple X Records
- Past members: Rich Hutchins; Algis Kizys; Carolyn Master; Ted Parsons; Vincent Signorelli; Diane Wlezien

Of Cabbages and Kings is an American noise rock band from Chicago, Illinois. Its name is a quote from Lewis Carroll's Through the Looking-Glass. The band's sound has been described as a "highly visceral attack" that is "founded on a vivid technical mastery owing little to the commonly revered tenets of speed and/or flash, instead conjuring a brutal, primal power and intensity virtually unmatched in modern music."

== Band history ==
Formed by members of the Bag People in 1985, the band's original lineup consisted of Algis Kizys (bass, vocals), Carolyn Master (guitar, keyboards, vocals) and Ted Parsons (drums, vocals). However, Kizys and Master were the core of the band, remaining the only consistent members throughout its existence. All three of their albums featured Diane Wlezien, who sang lead vocals on about half the songs with Kizys handling lead vocals on the remainder.

In 1988, Ted left to focus on his work with the band Prong and was replaced by Rich Hutchins (Live Skull, Ruin..., Lubricated Goat, etc.). Basic Pain Basic Pleasure was released in 1990 and is usually considered the highpoint of the band's discography, showcasing refined production and arrangements with increased musical variety. Swans drummer Vincent Signorelli joined the band to record their final album titled Hunter's Moon, which also featured guest appearances by Motherhead Bug vocalist David Ouimet, former drummer Ted Parsons and composer J. G. Thirlwell. Due to obligations with other bands, Of Cabbages and Kings rarely had time to tour and disbanded in the early nineties.

== Discography ==
Studio albums

- Face (1988, Purge/Sound League)
- Basic Pain Basic Pleasure (1990, Triple X)
- Hunter's Moon (1992, Triple X)

EPs

- Of Cabbages and Kings (1987, Purge/Sound League)

Singles

- "The Reign" / "Blindness" (1990, Triple X)

Compilation appearances

- The End of Music (As We Know It) - "Father" (1988, ROIR)
- Mondostereo - "Of Service" (1988, Away From The Pulsebeat/The Tinnitus)
- New-York Hardcore Teil 2 - "The Veil Thins" (1988, Speed Air Play)
- Triple X Records Compilation #4, Hear 'Em Spin - "The Reign" (1990, Triple X)
- Mesomorph Enduros - "The Reign" (1990, Big Cat)
- Welcome to Our Nightmare: A Tribute to Alice Cooper - "Lay Down and Die, Goodbye" (1990, Triple X)
