= Raise the Plow =

Studio album by Railroad Jerk
- Released: 1992
- Genre: Indie rock
- Label: Matador
- Producer: Railroad Jerk

Railroad Jerk chronology
| Railroad Jerk (1990) | Raise the Plow (1992) | One Track Mind (1995) |

Raise the Plow is the second album by the American band Railroad Jerk, released in 1992. They supported it by opening for the Jon Spencer Blues Explosion on a North American tour.

== Production ==
The album was produced by Railroad Jerk. The drummer Steve Cerio joined the band prior to the recording sessions. William Berger, of Uncle Wiggly, played guitar on some of the tracks; the guitarist Alec Stephen is pictured in the album packaging but did not contribute to the sessions. "Fixin' to Die" is an interpretation of the Bukka White song.

== Critical reception ==
Professional ratings
Review scores
| Source | Rating |
|---|---|
| AllMusic | 2.5/5 stars |
| The Boston Phoenix | 3/4 stars |
| Chicago Tribune | 2.5/4 stars |
| The Encyclopedia of Popular Music | 3/5 stars |
| The Great Indie Discography | 5/10 |
| Kalamazoo Gazette | 4/4 stars |
| MusicHound Rock: The Essential Album Guide | 3.5/5 stars |

The Chicago Tribune concluded, "Although a number of indie rock bands have evinced a new interest in blues, Railroad Jerk is among the few that demonstrates at least a touch of empathy and understanding for the form." The Washington Post said that Railroad Jerk "stalks the line between stale retro-rock and sterile art-noise", but noted that "bassist Tony Lee and drummer Steve Cerio do demonstrate a way with sway rare in their peer group." The Rocket stated that "though the footnotes are fairly obvious, they don't intrude on the jarring beauty of Railroad Jerk's songs."

The Kalamazoo Gazette said that the lyrics "recall the darkly funny writings of Flannery O'Connor". Comparing the band to Pussy Galore, The Morning Call praised the "primal exuberance that scatters all the conventions of rhythm, vocalizing and per-fessional playing." The Boston Phoenix appreciated that the band knew that "skronk can be some of the most boring crap in the world when not in the company of thrust." Psychotronic Video opined that "the bleary visionaries in RJ somehow seem to come by their musical purgatory more naturally than the rest—this is music of the heart, not hair."

== Track listing ==
| No. | Title | Length |
|---|---|---|
| 1. | "These Streets" |
| 2. | "Call Me the Son" |
| 3. | "Pin Prick" |
| 4. | "During the War" |
| 5. | "Fixin' to Die" |
| 6. | "In the Main" |
| 7. | "I Wanna Sway You" |
| 8. | "Yes Baby" |
| 9. | "You Can't Go Back" |
| 10. | "Hanging Around" |
