= Afterglow (Marcellus Hall & The Hostages album) =

Studio album by Marcellus Hall & The Hostages
- Released: December 10, 2013
- Length: 42:38

Marcellus Hall chronology
The First Line (2011)	Afterglow (2013)

Afterglow is the second solo album by illustrator and musician Marcellus Hall. The title song was listed on the New York Music Daily as song #48 on the 100 best songs of 2012 before the album was released. The Hostages consist of Troy Fannin on keyboard and guitar, Mike Shapiro on drums, and Damon Smith on bass. Mike Duclos also played Upright Bass on the album. Marcellus Hall said the members of the Hostages where not literally hostages but said this backup band was more cohesive as a group over other backup ensembles he had played with. The album was released at Rockwood Music Hall on the Lower East Side of Manhattan in New York City on December 10, 2013.

== Track listing ==
All lyrics and music written by Marcellus Hall.

No.	Title	Length
1.	"Soulmate"	3:36
2.	"Still in Range"	2:51
3.	"Over You (slow version)"	3:30
4.	"Floating"	4:29
5.	"No Longer With Us"	2:59
6.	"Long Story Short"	3:24
7.	"High Road"	3:16
8.	"Rainfall & Laughter"	4:09
9.	"False Move"	3:26
10.	"Wait A Minute"	6:01
11.	"Afterglow"	2:21
12.	"Over You (fast version)"	2:36
