= Face (Of Cabbages and Kings album) =

Studio album by Of Cabbages and Kings
- Released: 1988
- Recorded: Fun City Studios (New York City, NY)
- Genre: Noise rock
- Length: 32:01
- Label: Purge/Sound League
- Producer: Algis Kizys, Carolyn Master, Ted Parsons, Wharton Tiers

Of Cabbages and Kings chronology
Of Cabbages and Kings (1987)	Face (1988)	Basic Pain Basic Pleasure (1990)

Face is the debut album of Of Cabbages and Kings, released by Purge/Sound League in 1988.

== Track listing ==
All music is composed by Of Cabbages and Kings.

Side one
No.	Title	Lyrics	Vocals	Length
1.	"Sister"	Diane Wlezien	Diane Wlezien	4:59
2.	"The Last Ripper"	Carolyn Master	Diane Wlezien	6:24
3.	"_____________"	traditional	Diane Wlezien	5:03

Side two
No.	Title	Lyrics	Vocals	Length
1.	"Easiest Room in Hell"	Ted Parsons	Algis Kizys, Carolyn Master, Diane Wlezien	4:09
2.	"Short Line of Angels"	Algis Kizys	Diane Wlezien	4:50
3.	"The Descent"	Carolyn Master	Algis Kizys, Carolyn Master	3:41
4.	"Bünga Bünga Bünga"	Diane Wlezien	Algis Kizys, Carolyn Master, Ted Parsons, Diane Wlezien	2:52

== Personnel ==
Adapted from the Face liner notes.

Of Cabbages and Kings

- Algis Kizys – bass guitar, vocals (B1, B3, B4), production, design
- Carolyn Master – guitar, vocals (B1, B3, B4), production, design
- Ted Parsons – drums, vocals (B4), production
- Diane Wlezien – vocals (A1-A3, B1, B2, B4)

Additional musicians

- Laurence Olivier – spoken word (A3)
- Miriam Sussman – piano (A2), violin (B2)
- Robert Troch – accordion (A1, B4)

Technical personnel

- Chris Gehringer – mastering
- Kramer – engineering (A2)
- Wharton Tiers – production, engineering
- Daryl Trivieri – illustrations

== Release history ==
Region	Date	Label	Format	Catalog
United States	1988	Purge/Sound League	LP	PURGE 024
