= Headkick Facsimile =

EP by Cop Shoot Cop
- Released: 1989
- Recorded: October 1988
- Studio: Fun City, NYC
- Genre: Noise rock, industrial rock
- Length: 17:03
- Label: Supernatural Organization
- Producer: Cop Shoot Cop

Cop Shoot Cop chronology
Headkick Facsimile (1989)	PieceMan EP (1989)

Headkick Facsimile is an EP by American noise rock band Cop Shoot Cop, released in 1989 by Supernatural Organization.

== Track listing ==
All tracks are written by Tod Ashley, David Ouimet and Phil Puleo.

Side one
No.	Title	Length
1.	"Shine on Elizabeth"	2:45
2.	"Mistake"	3:43
3.	"Smash Retro!"	1:42

Side two
No.	Title	Length
1.	"Triumphal Theme"	2:47
2.	"Lie"	2:47
3.	"Fire in the Hole"	3:18

== Personnel ==
Adapted from the Headkick Facsimile liner notes.

Cop Shoot Cop

- Tod Ashley – lead vocals, bass guitar
- David Ouimet – sampler
- Phil Puleo – drums, percussion

Production and additional personnel

- Cop Shoot Cop – production, mixing
- Subvert Entertainment – cover art, design
- Wharton Tiers – engineering, mixing

== Release history ==
Region	Date	Label	Format	Catalog
Japan	1989	Supernatural Organization	LP	SUR MLP 6
United States	1994	Subvert Entertainment	CS	SEC01
