= White Hassle =

White Hassle was a blues punk band formed in 1997 by singer Marcellus Hall after the breakup of his previous group Railroad Jerk. White Hassle was based in New York, New York. Dave Varenka (also of Railroad Jerk) played drums, with Chris Maxwell and Joachim Kearns on guitars. The Houston Chronicle described their music as "stripped-down ... noisy blues-soaked rock".

Their debut album, "National Chain," was released on Matador Records in 1997.

White Hassle released albums on Matador Records, Fargo Records, Mazri Records, and Orange Recordings. The band toured Europe and America before disbanding in 2006.

== Critical reaction ==
Isaac Brock of the band Modest Mouse credits White Hassle's "Life Is Still Sweet" in helping turn around his songwriting and influencing their hit song "Float On." "When I heard it (Life is Still Sweet)," Brock said, "I thought, 'This is nice. This is actually an unsarcastically positive song.' I was like, 'Let's fuck this doom-and- gloom bullshit.' It was a really good thing to get reminded of, you know?"

delarue described the song "Life Is Still Sweet" live performance as uplifting and a crowd favorite.

Jason Ankeny described the music as "primitive folk/blues"

After the song Life Is Still Sweet, the band's second most notable song may be Star Position whose lyrics contemplate the single life: "The key is in the ignition / If you're single you can sleep in the star position." Hall sang a version of the song on Eugene Mirman and Bobby Tisdale's "Invite Them Up" comedy CD. He also re-recorded the song for his solo album The First Line.

== Discography ==
=== Albums ===
- National Chain (Matador, 1997)
- The Death of Song (Orange Music, 2003)
- Your Language (Fargo, 2005)
- The Death of Song/The Watertank (Fargo, 2005)

=== EP ===
- Life Is Still Sweet (2000)
