= Sulfur (band) =

American rock band

Background information
- Origin: New York City, United States
- Genres: Rock
- Years active: 1991–1998
- Label: Goldenfly
- Past members: Michele Amar; Neil Benezra; April Chung; Jim Colarusso; Tony Corsano; Mateo DeCosmos; Fiona Doherty; Yuval Gabay; Nick Heathen; Paula Henderson; Shoyo Iida; Dan Joeright; Tokie Koyama; David Ouimet; Heather Paauwe; Norman Westberg

Sulfur was an American rock ensemble formed by Michele Amar in New York City in 1991. It was originally an outlet for Amar's solo work until it expanded drastically with the inclusion of seven members and a number of additional side personnel.

== History ==
=== Early activity (1991–1994) ===
Sulfur's beginnings can be traced to a musical project began in 1991 by French musician Michele Amar, who had started composing and recording music under the name Virus. Having moved to New York in 1985, Amar had already built a reputation on the scene for working under producer Roli Mosimann and engineering albums for Celtic Frost, That Petrol Emotion and The Young Gods. In 1992 Amar released the song "Dirt" under the name Virus on the compilation Manhattan on the Rocks released by Pow Wow Records. Amar wanted to perform in a live setting so she enlisted the help of violinist April Chung of Motherhead Bug, drummer Yuval Gabay of Soul Coughing and bassist Adam Nodelman of Missing Foundation. After playing several shows, the band changed its name to Sulfur after being informed that another band had already taken the name Virus.

=== Musical maturity and Delirium Tremens (1994–1998) ===
In 1994 the ensemble entered the studio to record "Water Song" and "Nova Sangre" and released the music as a single. At this point the band had been expanded to include Michele Amar, April Chung, Jim Colarusso, Tony Corsano, Yuval Gabay, Nick Heathen, Shoyo Iida and Tokie Koyama. After altering the line-up again, the ensemble released its first and only full-length studio album Delirium Tremens in 1998.

== Discography ==
Studio albums

- Delirium Tremens (1998, Goldenfly)

Singles

- "Water Song"/"Nova Sangre" (1994, Lungcast)

Compilation appearances

- Manhattan on the Rocks - "Dirt" (as Virus) (1992, Pow Wow)
- New Music Nights Festival (Unsigned '93) - "Tongue Fire" (1994, New Music Seminar)
