= Release (Cop Shoot Cop album) =

Studio album by Cop Shoot Cop
- Released: 1994
- Recorded: November 1993 – March 1994
- Studio: BC, New York City; Magic Shop, New York City
- Genre: Rock
- Length: 50:09
- Label: Interscope
- Producer: Cop Shoot Cop, Dave Sardy

Cop Shoot Cop chronology
Ask Questions Later (1993)	Release (1994)

Professional ratings
Review scores
Source	Rating
AllMusic	3/5 stars

Release is the fourth and final album by American noise rock group Cop Shoot Cop, released in 1994 by Interscope Records.

The group expanded to a quintet with new member Steven McMillen on guitar and trumpet, and keyboardist Jim Coleman shifted from his sample-based approach to more use of convention piano than the group's earlier albums.

Cop Shoot Cop dissolved amid creative disagreement and personal problems while recording their fifth album which was never officially released but demos have been bootlegged. Frontman Tod Ashley quickly formed Firewater, and the other members of Cop Shoot Cop moved on to various musical efforts. Coleman worked solo under the name Phylr, while drummer Phil Puleo became a longtime member of fellow New Yorkers Swans and Jack Natz worked with Lubricated Goat.

Release went out of print from Interscope in the U.S., but was re-issued by Cleopatra Records in 2014.

== Track listing ==
All tracks are written by Tod Ashley, Jim Coleman, Steven McMillen, Jack Natz and Phil Puleo.

No.	Title	Length
1.	"Interference"	4:14
2.	"It Only Hurts When I Breathe"	3:39
3.	"Last Legs"	3:47
4.	"Two at a Time"	4:01
5.	"Slackjaw"	3:38
6.	"Lullaby"	3:49
7.	"Any Day Now"	3:34
8.	"Swimming in Circles"	4:17
9.	"Turning Inside Out"	3:52
10.	"Ambulance Song"	4:22
11.	"Suckerpunch"	3:38
12.	"The Divorce"	4:13
13.	"Money-Drunk"	3:05

== Personnel ==
Cop Shoot Cop

- Tod Ashley – lead vocals, high-end bass guitar
- Jim Coleman – sampler, piano
- Steven McMillen – guitar, trumpet
- Jack Natz – low-end bass guitar, harmonica, vocals
- Phil Puleo – drums, percussion

Production and additional personnel

- Martin Bisi – recording (10), mixing (10)
- Cop Shoot Cop – production
- Edward Douglas – recording (1–9, 11–13)
- Suzanne Dyer – mixing (1–9, 11–13)
- Greg Gordon – recording, mixing
- David Ouimet – trombone (3, 12)
- Dave Sardy – production, recording (1–9, 11–13), mixing (1–9, 11–13)
- Howie Weinberg – mastering

== Release history ==
Region	Date	Label	Format	Catalog
United Kingdom	1994	Big Cat	CD, LP	ABB 69
United States	1994	Interscope	CD, CS, LP	92424
Germany	1994	Rough Trade	CD	RTD 131.1850.2
United States	2014	Cleopatra	LP	1900
