= Hunter's Moon (album) =

Studio album by Of Cabbages and Kings
- Released: 1992
- Recorded: Fun City Studios (New York City, NY)
- Genre: Noise rock
- Length: 44:24
- Label: Triple X
- Producer: Algis Kizys, Carolyn Master, Wharton Tiers

Of Cabbages and Kings chronology
Basic Pain Basic Pleasure (1990)	Hunter's Moon (1992)

Hunter's Moon is the third studio album by the noise rock band Of Cabbages and Kings. It was released in 1992 on Triple X Records.

== Track listing ==
All music is composed by Of Cabbages and Kings.

No.	Title	Lyrics	Vocals	Length
1.	"Faucet"	J. G. Thirlwell	J. G. Thirlwell	2:29
2.	"Conjuration"	Diane Wlezien	Diane Wlezien	5:18
3.	"K.C."	Algis Kizys	Algis Kizys	6:45
4.	"Came to Need"	Carolyn Master	Carolyn Master, Diane Wlezien	8:52
5.	"Assassin"	Diane Wlezien	Diane Wlezien	3:21
6.	"The Accuser"	Carolyn Master	Vincent Signorelli, Diane Wlezien	5:33
7.	"Stranger"	Algis Kizys	Carolyn Master, Diane Wlezien	5:19
8.	"The Hunter"	Algis Kizys	Algis Kizys, Carolyn Master, Diane Wlezien	6:44

== Personnel ==
Adapted from the Hunter's Moon liner notes.

Of Cabbages and Kings

- Algis Kizys – bass guitar, vocals (3, 8), production
- Carolyn Master – guitar, vocals (4, 7, 8), production
- Vincent Signorelli – drums, vocals (7)
- Diane Wlezien – vocals (2, 4–8)

Additional musicians

- Eric Hubel – guitar (8)
- David Ouimet – keyboards (6)
- Ted Parsons – drums (8)
- J. G. Thirlwell – vocals (1)

Technical personnel

- Barry Diament – mastering
- Sandra Hamburg – photography
- Wharton Tiers – production, engineering

== Release history ==
Region	Date	Label	Format	Catalog
United States	1992	Triple X	CD, CS	51114
