= Cop Shoot Cop =

American noise rock band

- Origin: New York City, New York, U.S.
- Genres: Noise rock, industrial rock, no wave
- Years active: 1987–1996
- Labels: Interscope, Big Cat, Circuit
- Past members: Tod A. Jim Coleman; Steven McMillen; Jack Natz; Phil Puleo; David Ouimet; Michael Kaminski

Cop Shoot Cop was a noise rock group founded in New York City in 1987. They disbanded in 1996. The band were frequently classified as industrial rock, but were often quite different from many bands so dubbed: having a distinctive instrumental lineup that encompassed twin bass guitars, found metal percussion, and no lead guitar. The group had little mainstream success (scoring a few hits on college radio), despite tours with Iggy Pop and music videos on MTV's Headbangers Ball and 120 Minutes (notably for "$10 Bill", featuring a number of little people). They retain a cult following—their out-of-print releases sometimes sell for large amounts.

== History ==
Initially, the group was a trio of Tod A. (vocals, bass guitar), David Ouimet (keyboards, sampler) and Phil Puleo on drums and "metal" (he incorporated various found objects into his drum set). (Tod and Puleo had earlier played in a short-lived Providence, Rhode Island group, Dig Dat Hole, with guitarist John Rose). The A./Puleo/Ouimet lineup was captured on the "Headkick Facsimile" 12" EP, which was released in a small pressing by the Japanese record label Supernatural Organization in 1989 (later reissued by the group's own Subvert Entertainment in 1994 with the addition of the song "Robert Tilton Handjob" from the "Piece Man" 7"). Wharton Tiers engineered the EP.

Puleo reports their name was inspired by both the band members' shared dislike of police officers, and a newspaper headline about a botched police raid, reading "'Cop Shot Cop" or "Cop Shoots Cop".

The trio placed a number of posters stating only "CopShootCop" around New York, which helped generate discussion and interest; some observers reportedly thought the posters were a political protest against police brutality.

Their first performance was with Half Japanese.

The trio added Jack Natz (formerly bassist in early New York hardcore band The Undead) on bass guitar and Tod briefly sang without playing bass. They missed Tod's distinctive "high end" bass playing, however, and they realized only popular convention required a single bass player in a rock band, and both Tod and Natz decided to play the instrument with the group. The relative novelty of a dual-bass, no-guitar rock group certainly helped gather attention. Natz sang occasionally, and various members wrote songs, but Tod remained the group's primary singer and songwriter.

Ouimet rejoined and left the group several times; Jim Coleman was recruited to replace him on sampler, and both men were in the group for their debut recording, the "Piece Man" 7" in 1989. The cover was splattered with real pig's blood, garnering them notoriety. Their first full-length album, Consumer Revolt, recorded by notable producer Martin Bisi, was recorded with two bass guitars and samplers each, and no non-bass guitar. The band quickly earned a reputation as one of the best live bands in NYC, as well as for prolific band graffiti.

After the first album and tour, Ouimet left for good: he founded the short-lived Motherhead Bug and would later guest with Cop Shoot Cop, playing trombone or leading the "Motherhead Horns" horn section.

Cop Shoot Cop continued recording and touring; they surprised some fans by recruiting guitarist Steve McMillen for Release, released by Interscope Records. Ned Raggett argues that McMillen's appearance "Given how Cop Shoot Cop had evolved its own unique sound out of the basses, drums, and samplers from the original members, becoming more of a straight-ahead rock group inevitably made the band a little less special." (Still, he offers a largely positive review). A different review notes that "Tod A. is the Andrew Vachss of underground rock, telling stories of pathetic losers and maniac outsiders who believe they are the sane ones", while Black and Sprague note that Release finds Cop Shoot Cop "sneaking surreptitiously toward the mainstream". In late 1995, Michael Kaminski replaced McMillen on guitar.

The band dissolved later on in 1996. Tod claimed the group had been treated poorly by Interscope, and refused to allow the company to issue their final album. The other band members disagreed, noting the album was very nearly complete, and that they had all worked on the $150,000 recording sessions. The remaining members of Cop Shoot Cop (Natz, Puleo, Coleman, and Kaminski) attempted to complete the album, but Interscope declined to release the material. It eventually found an outlet in the album Red Expendables.

=== Post-Cop Shoot Cop ===
Tod A formed Firewater, who have released seven albums. Coleman has recorded as "Phylr" and "Here" (with Teho Teardo), Puleo played with both Congo Norvell and Swans as well composing for film, and Jack Natz most recently teamed up with Stu Spasm to handle bass duties for a reformed Lubricated Goat. Coleman and Puleo have worked together on a project called Audio Dyslexia. More recently, Coleman and Puleo have collaborated with film and theater actor and writer Michael Wiener on a project called "The Children...", releasing a self-titled CD and performing a number of show-events typically integrating projections and theatrical elements, and occurring in nontraditional venues such as multimedia dinner theaters and churches.

On their 1997 album City, Strapping Young Lad covered "Room 429" (originally from Cop Shoot Cop's Ask Questions Later.) In the same year, space rock band Spiritualized included a track titled "Cop Shoot Cop" on their album Ladies and Gentlemen We Are Floating in Space.

In 2005, Cop Shoot Cop's "Migration" (Puleo) was used in a television ad for Nike.

Kaminski continued to play music in Europe, eventually returning to his hometown of Akron, Ohio. In 2008, he was reported to have conducted a botched robbery with a cologne bottle (shaped as a gun).

In late 2019, Phil Puleo and Jim Coleman joined Chris Spencer (from the now disbanded UNSANE) and Chris Pravdica (former Puleo bandmate from Swans) to form the industrial/rock/noise supergroup Human Impact. Their first album, titled Human Impact, was released in March 2020.

== Members ==
- Tod A. – vocals, bass guitar (1987–1996)
- Phil Puleo – drums, percussion (1987–1996)
- David Ouimet – keyboards, sampler (1987–1989)
- Jack Natz – bass guitar, vocals, harmonica (1988–1996)
- Jim Coleman – sampler, piano (1988–1996)
- Steven McMillen – guitar, trumpet (1993–1995)
- Michael Kaminski – guitar (1995–1996)

== Discography ==
=== Studio albums ===
Date	Title	Label
1990	Consumer Revolt	Circuit
1991	White Noise	Big Cat
1993	Ask Questions Later	Interscope
1994	Release	Interscope

=== Splits and EPs ===
Date	Title	Label	Format	Notes
1989	Headkick Facsimile	Supernatural Organization	12"	Rereleased in 1994 on cassette with a song from the Piece Man 7"
1989	PieceMan EP	Vertical	7"	Cover spattered with pig's blood
1989	Live at CBGB		Cassette	300 copies, Japanese release
1992	Helmet vs. Cop Shoot Cop	Micro Records	7"	Bootleg split with Helmet
1992	Suck City	Interscope		
1996	Dick Smoker Plus	Fused Coil	7", CD	Split with Meathead
1997	Red Expendables		EP	

=== Singles ===
Date	Title	Label	Format
1993	"$10 Bill"	Interscope	CD
1993	"Room 429"	Interscope	CD
1994	"Interference"	Interscope	
1994	"Two at a Time"	Big Cat	CD
1995	"Any Day Now"	Big Cat	CD

=== Compilation appearances ===
Date	Title	Track	Label	Format
1991	New York Eye & Ear Control	"Dive"	Matador	CD
1992	Mesomorph Enduros (V/A compilation)	"Room 429"	Big Cat	CD, LP
1995	Johnny Mnemonic (Motion Picture Soundtrack)	"3 AM Incident"	Columbia	CD
1994	S.F.W. (Motion Picture Soundtrack)	"Two at a Time"	A&M	CD
2014	Mortar – Various Artists	"Chameleon Man" and "Suck City"	Atypeek Music	Digital publishing
