= Teho Teardo =

Italian musician and composer (born 1966)

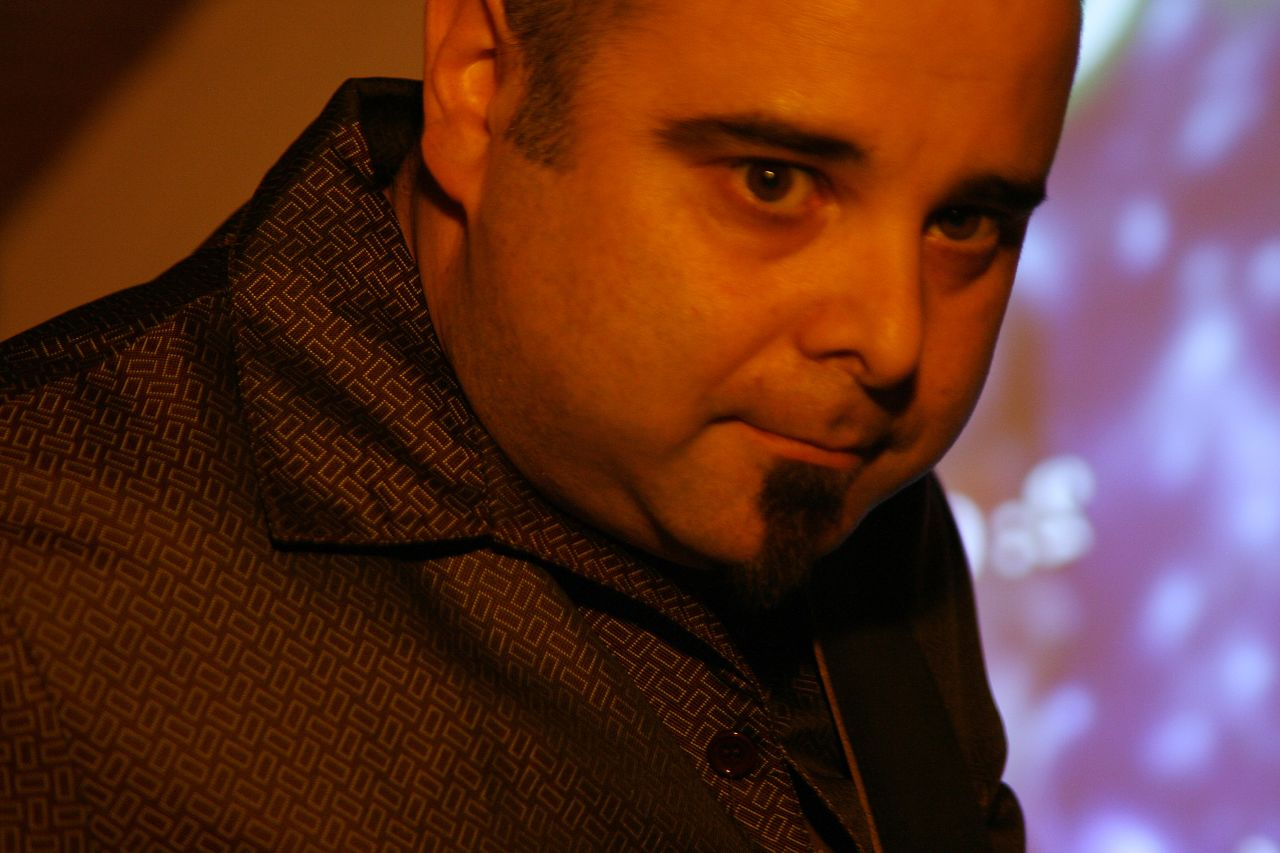

Background information
- Birth name: Mauro Teho Teardo
- Born: 19 September 1966 (age 58); Pordenone, Italy
- Genres: Electronic music
- Occupation(s): Composer, musician, sound artist
- Years active: 1986–present
- Labels: Minus Habens Records; Invisible Records; Expanding Records; Cargo Records

Teho Teardo (born 1966) is an Italian musician and composer.

He is a founding member of the rock band Meathead. In the 1990s he collaborated with Mick Harris, Jim Coleman and Lydia Lunch. With Scott McCloud (Girls Against Boys) he started a new project called Operator. Together they released an album titled Welcome to the Wonderful World in 2003, and toured with Placebo. In 2006, with Erik Friedlander, he made an album inspired by Pier Paolo Pasolini's poetry. In 2013 he started a fruitful collaboration with Blixa Bargeld and they have released four albums to date.

Teardo has composed musical scores for many Italian films like Gabriele Salvatores' Denti, Paolo Sorrentino's The Family Friend, Andrea Molaioli's Slam, and Il Divo. For Denti he was awarded the Quality prize from the Italian Minister of Culture. For his soundtrack Il Divo Teardo won the David di Donatello Award in 2009.

He lives and works in Rome.

== Discography ==
Solo releases:

- Caught from Behind (Minus Habens Records 1990)
- Paid in Full (Minus Habens Records 1991)
- Tower/Microphone (2005)
- Ballyturk (2014)

With Erik Friedlander:

- Giorni Rubati (2006)

With Modern Institute:

- Excellent Swimmer (2006)

With Operator:

- Welcome to the Wonderful World (2003)

With Here:

- Brooklyn Bank (1997)

With Matera:

- Same Here (1996)

With Blixa Bargeld:

- Still Smiling (2013)
- Spring (2014)
- Nerissimo (2016)
- Fall (2017)
- Live in Berlin (2023)
- Christian & Mauro (2024)
