= Cabbages and Kings (Canadian TV program) =

- Genre: Panel discussion
- Presented by: Arthur Phelps
- Country of origin: Canada
- Original language: English
- No. of seasons: 1

Production
- Running time: 30 minutes

Original release
- Network: CBC Television
- Release: 6 July – 27 September 1955

Cabbages and Kings is a Canadian panel discussion television program that aired on CBC Television in 1955.

== Premise ==
This Vancouver-produced program featured topics such as broadcasting with radio host Jack Webster and lawyer Bill McConnell. Northrop Frye was featured on an episode about national reading habits. The topic of crime was discussed by McConnel, Roderick Haig-Brown and prison warden Hugh Christie. The show's moderator was Arthur Phelps.

== Scheduling ==
This half-hour program was broadcast Wednesdays at 10:30 p.m. (Eastern) from 6 July to 27 September 1955.
