= Algis Kizys =

American bass guitarist

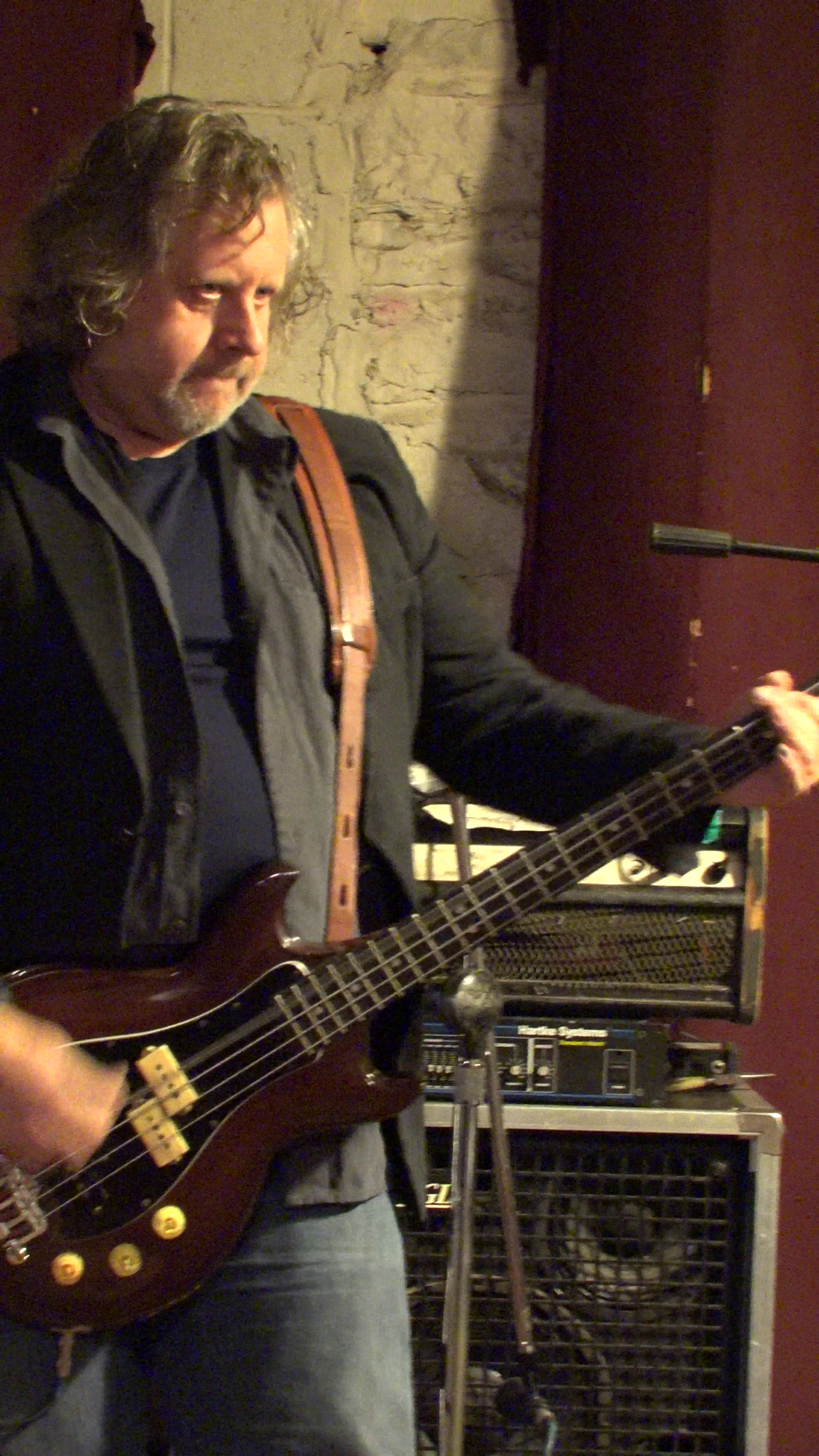

Background information
- Born: Algis Antanas Kizys; September 8, 1960 (age 65); Chicago, Illinois, United States
- Origin: New York City, New York, United States
- Genres: Noise rock; industrial; post-punk; art rock
- Occupations: Musician, songwriter
- Instrument: Bass guitar
- Website: algiskizys.com

Algis Antanas Kizys (born September 8, 1960 in Chicago) is a New York City bass guitarist best known for his long-time membership in New York City band Swans. First joining Swans on 1986's Greed LP, he stayed with the group through The Great Annihilator (1995). He is also a founding member of Of Cabbages and Kings, an offshoot of Bag People.

== Biography ==
Of Cabbages and Kings featured Kizys, founder/guitarist/keyboardist/vocalist/producer Carolyn Master, Roy Mayorga (Nausea, Soulfly, Stone Sour), Vinnie Signorelli (Unsane), Ted Parsons (Prong, Swans, Godflesh, Jesu, Teledubgnosis) and Diane Wlezein. Kizys, Master, and Wlezein previously played in Bag People.

Kizys has spent time in Foetus' live incarnation and played for Glenn Branca in his Symphony No. 6.

Kizys was a member of Problem Dogs, his first band formed with Rick Radtke, John Connors, and Demetra Plakas (who later played drums with L7).

During this time, August 1982, he briefly joined forces with guitarist Edward "Phast Eddie" Lines, Connors and Plakas as Phlegm Magnets, which played several shows at the Space Place in Chicago.

From 1994 -1997 Algis Kizys created a band with singer songwriter Soraya Rashid called "Soraya". Other members included Norman Westberg (ex Swans), Ted Parsons (Prong), Vinnie Signorelli (Swans, Unsane), Eric Hubel (Glenn Branca), and J. G. Thirlwell (Foetus)

Kizys with Jonathan Bepler and David Thorpe composed "Firmament" for Nerve magazine's "Sweet & Vicious" audio book. Firmament served as a soundscape to the JT Leroy story, "Natoma Street", performed by Callie Thorne. Gus Van Sant used "Firmament" for the pivotal scene in his film, "Finding Forrester", starring Sean Connery.

Kizys's current band, NeVAh, features Vinnie Signorelli from Unsane and Norman Westberg from Swans. NeVAh are currently playing in what is left of New York's underground scene.

== Discography ==
Swans

Year	Name	Ref
1986	Greed	
1986	Holy Money	
1987	Children of God	
1992	Love of Life	
1995	The Great Annihilator	

Of Cabbages and Kings

Year	Name	Ref
1987	Of Cabbages and Kings	
1988	Face	
1990	Basic Pain Basic Pleasure	
1992	Hunter's Moon	

Other appearances

Year	Name	Artist	Ref
1989	Symphony No. 6 (Devil Choirs at the Gates of Heaven)	Glenn Branca	
1992	Male	Foetus in Excelsis Corruptus Deluxe	
