= Of Cabbages and Kings (EP) =

EP by Of Cabbages and Kings
- Released: 1987
- Recorded: Fun City Studios (New York City, NY)
- Genre: Noise rock
- Length: 22:01
- Label: Purge/Sound League
- Producer: Algis Kizys, Carolyn Master, Wharton Tiers

Of Cabbages and Kings chronology
Of Cabbages and Kings (1987)	Face (1988)

Professional ratings
Review scores
Source	Rating
New Musical Express	8/10

Of Cabbages and Kings is the eponymously titled EP by Of Cabbages and Kings, released by Purge/Sound League on 1987.

== Track listing ==
All music is composed by Of Cabbages and Kings.

Side one
No.	Title	Lyrics	Vocals	Length
1.	"The Veil Thins"	David Stowell	Algis Kizys	3:45
2.	"Jack"	Carolyn Master	Carolyn Master	5:34
3.	"I"	Carolyn Master	Carolyn Master, Ted Parsons	4:19

Side two
No.	Title	Lyrics	Vocals	Length
1.	"Bud"	Charles Baudelaire	John Erskine, Ted Parsons	8:19

== Personnel ==
Adapted from the Of Cabbages and Kings liner notes.

Of Cabbages and Kings

- Algis Kizys – vocals, bass guitar, production, design
- Carolyn Master – guitar, keyboards (A1), vocals (A3), lap steel guitar (B), production, design
- Ted Parsons – drums, vocals (A3, B)

Additional musicians

- John Erskine – vocals (B)
- Frank Settembrini – bass guitar (A2)

Technical personnel

- Eleanor Kostyk – illustrations
- Wharton Tiers – production, engineering

== Release history ==
Region	Date	Label	Format	Catalog
United States	1987	Purge/Sound League	LP	PURGE 001
