= Ism (band) =

American alternative rock band

ism
- Origin: New York City
- Genre: Alternative rock
- Years active: 2004–2010
- Label: STM Records
- Members: Andre Mistier; Leigh Battle; Gerard Toriello; Felipe Torres
- Past members: Michael Higgins; Miguel Balbi; Greg Evans
- Website: ismmusic.com

ism is an East Coast-based alternative rock quartet founded in New York City in 2004. It combines elements of melodic rock, electronic, trip hop, and industrial music.

== History ==
The group came together when singer/guitarist Andre Mistier wanted to take a break from directing plays around New York City by starting a band that merged rock and electronic music. He hooked up with Yale acquaintance guitarist/vocalist Gerard Toriello, who then brought on childhood friend and drummer Michael Higgins. Taking their name from the concept of not wanting to be limited by one "ism" but rather explore – and ultimately gain understanding for – all that the world has to offer, ism were completed by the final addition of bassist Leigh Battle, who had been previously playing in another band with Higgins.

ism began performing together regularly around mid-2004, playing at live venues and festivals including the ConneXion International Music Festival in Jacksonville, Florida in 2005. They released their first single, "Breathe", in late 2005 and soon afterwards released their first album, Monkey Underneath in early 2006 on STM Records. With the popular singles "Breathe" and "Beside the Sun" featured on college radio, ism continued to tour nationwide throughout 2006. Two years later they returned with Urgency, an album produced by Joe Blaney, who had previously worked with The Clash, Beastie Boys and Tom Waits. Keyboardist Bernie Worrell made a guest appearance.

Greg Evans, who joined the band post-recording of Urgency, left in September 2008 and was replaced by drummer Felipe Torres, in time for the band to head out on a U.S. tour in support of the recently reunited band Mest.

== Members ==
=== Current members ===
- Andre Mistier- vocals, guitar (2004–present)
- Gerard Toriello – Lead guitar, backing vocals (2004–present)
- Leigh Battle – Bass, backing vocals (2004–present)
- Felipe Torres – drums, (2008–present)

=== Former members ===
- Greg Evans – drums, (2007–2008)
- Miguel Balbi- drums, (2005–2006)
- Michael Higgins – drums, (2004–2005)

== Discography ==
=== Studio albums ===
- Monkey Underneath (STM Records) 2006 (Distributor: BDG / RED Distribution)
- Urgency (STM Records) 2008 (Distributor: BDG / RED Distribution)

=== Music videos ===
- "Goodbye" (Directed by Pav Hatoupi) (2006)watch video
- "Breathe" (Directed by Pav Hatoupi) (2006)watch video
- "Sacred Cows" (Directed by Pav Hatoupi) (2008) watch video

=== Press ===
- FHM says "Urgency sounds like the bastard love child of the Killers and Nine Inch Nails with driving rhythm, heavy synthesized guitars and vocals that sound nearly identical to Brandon Flowers's "Somebody Told Me"."
- The Aquarian gave URGENCY an A+
- ISM recorded a session for UGO LIVE at Sweetfire studios –

=== Festival/tour appearances ===
- ConneXion International Music Festival (Jacksonville, FL) – 2005

=== Radio Singles ===
Current singles:

- "Sacred Cows"

=== Previous singles ===
- "Breathe"
    1. 1 Most Added Top 40 Main Chart (NMW,12/2/05)
    2. 3 Top Add – CMJ Radio 200 Add
    3. 5 Top 40 Main Chart (NMW 01/13/06)
    4. 49 cmJ Radio 200 (CMJ Issue 946 – 01/30/06)
  - Commercial ADDS: 52+ (12/12/05)
  - College ADDS: 152+ (12/09/05)
    1. 3 Top Add – CMJ Radio 200 Add
    2. 5 Top 40 Main Chart (NMW 01/13/06)
    3. 56 CMJ Radio 200 (CMJ Issue 945 – 01/23/06)
- "Beside the Sun" 04/25/06 ADD DATE: Alternative Format
- "Goodbye" 03/27/06 ADD DATE: CHR/POP Format
