= Robert D. San Souci =

American children's writer (1946–2014)

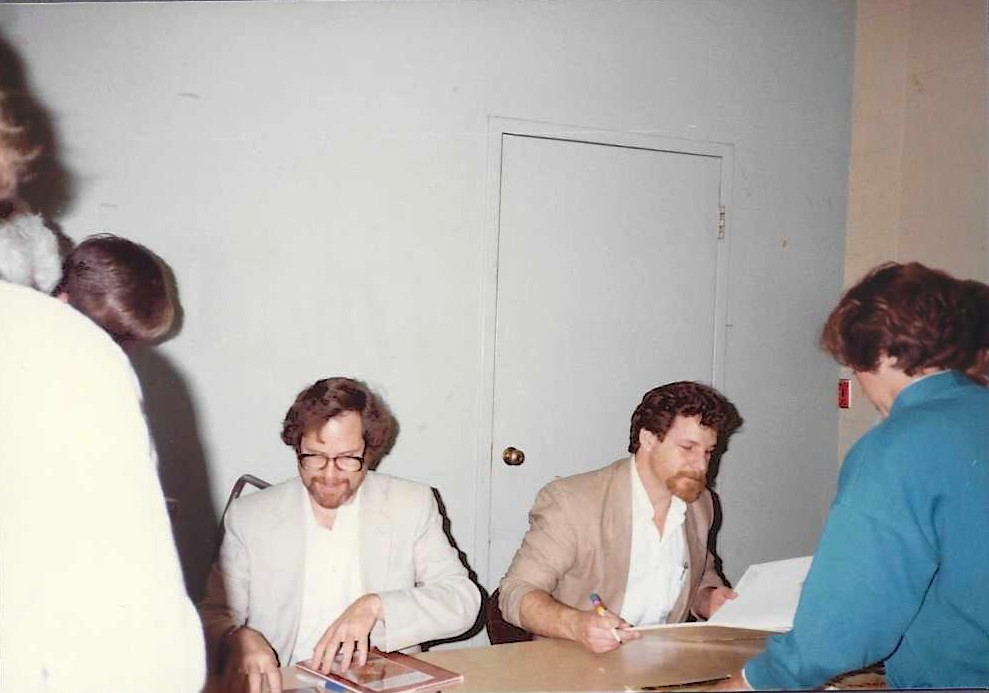
Robert San Souci at a book signing with his brother Daniel, April 24th, 1987.

Robert Daniel San Souci (October 10, 1946 – December 19, 2014) was an American children's book author known for his retellings of folktales for children. He often worked with his brother, Daniel San Souci, a children's book illustrator. He presented at conferences, trade shows, and in schools in the United States. According to Mary M. Burns in Horn Book, his adaptations are typified by "impeccable scholarship and a fluid storytelling style."

His version of the Chinese legend of a young woman who takes her father's place in war, posing as a man to fight the Tartars and winning the battle, was the basis for the Disney film Mulan; he wrote the story for the film. He produced primarily picture books, which were often retellings of folklore, but he also contributed original works to the horror and fantasy genres as well as creating non-fiction works aimed at children and adults. He was a regular contributor to a number of magazines, including Cobblestone, Faces, Calliope, and Appleseeds.

== Life and career ==
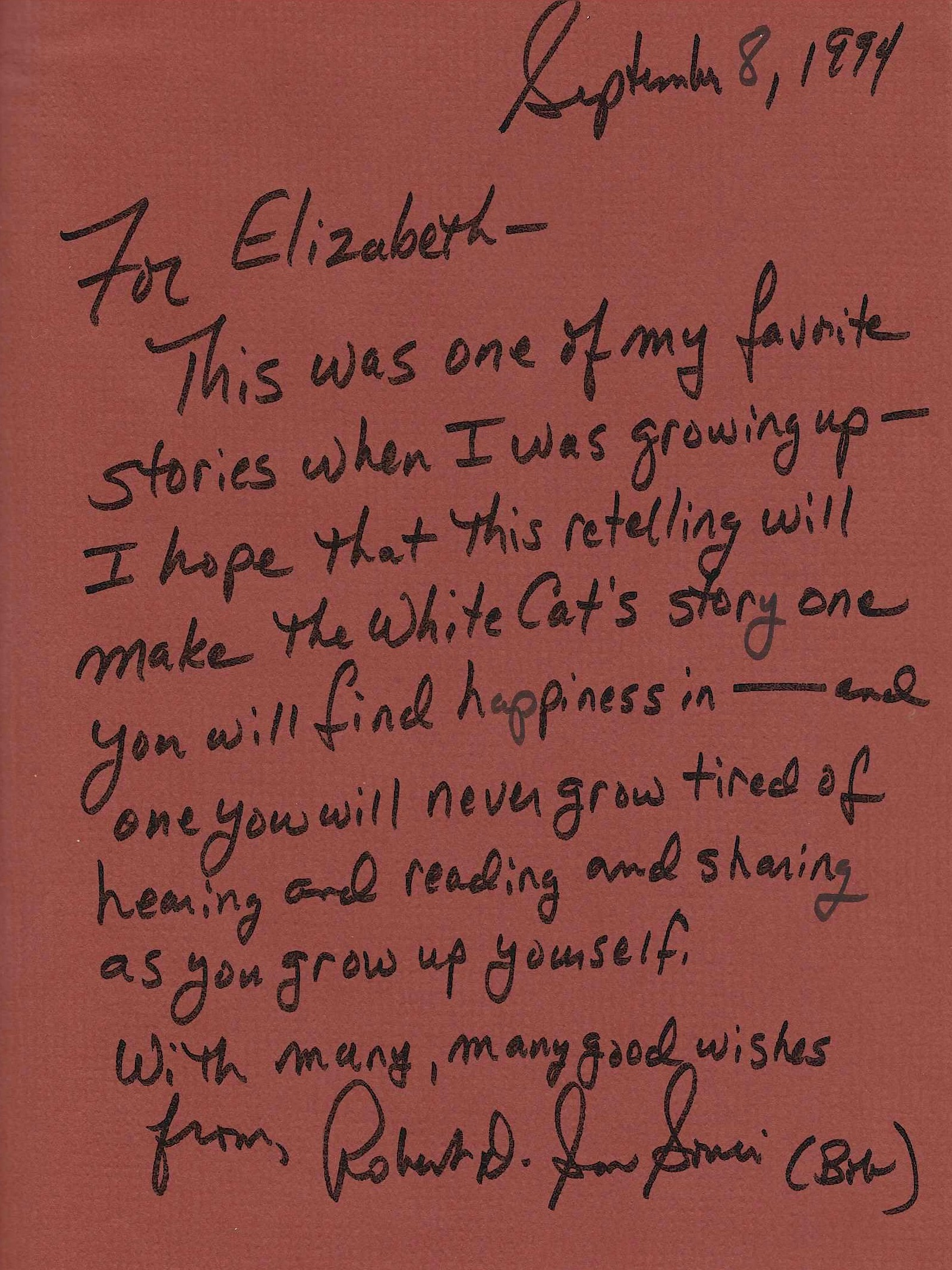
Inscription by San Souci to a young reader, September 8th, 1994.

Robert D. San Souci was born in San Francisco and raised nearby in Berkeley.

In elementary school, San Souci wrote for the school newspaper; in high school, he worked on the school yearbook and had an essay printed in a book titled T.V. as Art. As a student at St. Mary's College, he took a variety of classes in creative writing, English and world literature. In graduate school, he studied folklore, myths and world religions.

San Souci adapted folktales into the titles The Samurai's Daughter, The Enchanted Tapestry, The Talking Eggs, Sukey and the Mermaid, Cut from the Same Cloth, The Hired Hand, A Weave of Words, and the Caldecott Honor book The Faithful Friend. He also produced the Short and Shivery and Dare to Be Scared series, an Arthurian sequence, and retellings of Native American myths, most of which are directed to middle school students. His work puts an emphasis on strong female protagonists. San Souci was also a copywriter and a book editor. Prior to becoming a full-time author, he held jobs as a bookseller, editor, advertising copywriter, and theater and film reviewer.

San Souci stated that he gave permission for others to retell his stories with credit.

San Souci said of his first published book: "In 1978, my first book, The Legend of Scarface, was published and illustrated by my younger brother, Daniel San Souci. The book was highly acclaimed. I was lucky to have an artist/illustrator in the family – it's great working with Dan". Another time he said, "I love to travel by bus. I can sit and stare out the window and simply observe. I love to listen for the flow and rhythm of the language that different people use". He once journeyed around the United States, drawing inspiration from local legends, folktales, and history for works such as Cut from the Same Cloth: American Women of Myth, Legend, and Tall Tale (1993) and Kate Shelley: Bound for Legend (1994).

== Death ==
Robert D. San Souci died on December 19, 2014, at the age of 68, following a head injury resulting from a fall.

== Bibliography ==
=== Chapter books ===
- Short & Shivery: Thirty Chilling Tales, illustrated by Katherine Coville (1987)
- More Short & Shivery: Thirty Terrifying Tales, illustrated by Katherine Coville (1994)
- Even More Short & Shivery: Thirty Spine-Tingling Tales, illustrated by Jacqueline Rogers (1997)
- A Terrifying Taste of Short & Shivery: Thirty Creepy Tales, illustrated by Katherine Coville (1999)
- Dare to Be Scared: Thirteen Stories to Chill and Thrill, illustrated by David Ouimet. Cricket Books (2003), ISBN 0-8126-2688-5
- Haunted Houses (Are You Scared Yet? 1), co-illustrated by Kelly Murphy and Antoine Revoy (2010)

=== Picture books ===
- Robin Hood and the Golden Arrow, illustrated by E. B. Lewis (2010)
- Sister Trickster, illustrated by Daniel San Souci
- Young Merlin, illustrated by Daniel Horne
- The Hobyahs
- The Christmas Ark, illustrated by Daniel San Souci (1991)
- Weave Of Words: An Armenian Tale Retold, illustrated by Raul Colon. Orchard Books (1998) (from a Nagorno-Karabakh folktale)
- The Talking Eggs: A Folktale from the American South, illustrated by Jerry Pinkney. Dial Press (1989) (Caldecott Honor Book)
- N.C. Wyeth's Pilgrims (1991) (illustrated by murals begun by Wyeth for the Metropolitan Life Insurance Company)
- The Firebird, illustrated by Kris Waldherr. Dial Books (1992)
- The Red Heels, illustrated by Gary Kelley. Dial Books (1996)
- The Hired Hand: An African-American Folktale, illustrated by Jerry Pinkney. Dial Press (1997)
- Two Bear Cubs: A Miwok Legend from California's Yosemite Valley, illustrated by Daniel San Souci. Yosemite Association (1997)
- Cinderella Skeleton, illustrated by David Catrow (2004)
- " The Twins and the Bird of Darkness: a Hero Tale from the Caribbean", illustrated by Terry Widener (2002)
- Cendrillon: A Caribbean Cinderella, illustrated by Brian Pinkney (2002)
- Cut from the Same Rope: American Women of Myth, Legend, and Tall Tale, with Jane Yolen, illustrated by Brian Pinkney (2000)
- Fa Mulan: The Story of a Woman Warrior, illustrated by Jean & Mou-Sein Tseng (1998) (based on the legend of Hua Mulan)
- The Faithful Friend, illustrated by Brian Pinkney
- Sootface: An Objibwa Cinderella Story, illustrated by Daniel San Souci (1994)
- "Tarzan" llustrated by Michael McCurdy (1999)
