= Basic Pain Basic Pleasure =

Studio album by Of Cabbages and Kings
- Released: 1990
- Recorded: Fun City Studios (New York City, NY)
- Genre: Noise rock
- Length: 42:10
- Label: Triple X
- Producer: Algis Kizys, Carolyn Master, Wharton Tiers

Of Cabbages and Kings chronology
Face (1988)	Basic Pain Basic Pleasure (1990)	Hunter's Moon (1992)

Basic Pain Basic Pleasure is the second album by Of Cabbages and Kings, released in 1990 by Triple X Records.

== Track listing ==
All music is composed by Of Cabbages and Kings.

No.	Title	Lyrics	Vocals	Length
1.	"The Reign"	Algis Kizys	Algis Kizys, Diane Wlezien	6:05
2.	"Snake"	Algis Kizys	Algis Kizys, Diane Wlezien	3:25
3.	"Of Service"	Diane Wlezien	Carolyn Master, Diane Wlezien	5:19
4.	"Land of the '57 Chevy"	Carolyn Master	Diane Wlezien	7:05
5.	"Crawl"	Diane Wlezien	Carolyn Master, Diane Wlezien	4:25
6.	"Crawl Again"	Diane Wlezien	Diane Wlezien	3:10
7.	"Locked in Position"	Carolyn Master	Algis Kizys, Carolyn Master, Diane Wlezien	3:55
8.	"John Barleycorn Must Die"	Traditional, Algis Kizys	Diane Wlezien	8:46

== Personnel ==
Adapted from the Basic Pain Basic Pleasure liner notes.

Of Cabbages and Kings

- Richard Hutchins – drums, percussion, Chinese temple bells (1, 7)
- Algis Kizys – bass guitar, vocals (1, 2, 7), ukelin (6, 8), production
- Carolyn Master – guitar, vocals (3, 5, 7), keyboards (6), production
- Diane Wlezien – vocals, percussion (1)

Technical personnel

- Edward G. Lines – photography
- Wharton Tiers – production, engineering

== Release history ==
Region	Date	Label	Format	Catalog
United States	1990	Triple X	CD, CS, LP	51055
