= Phil Puleo =

American drummer (born 1963)

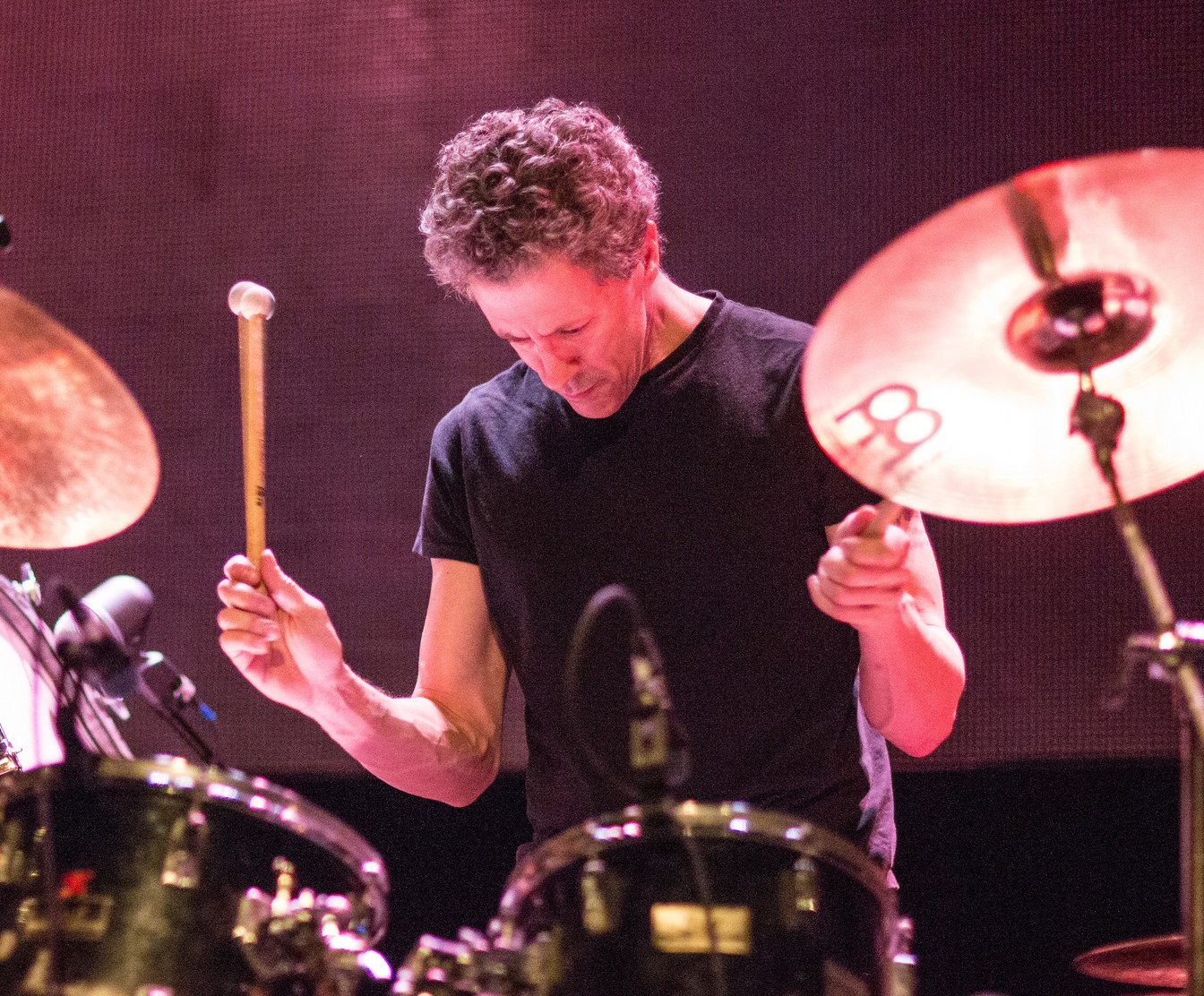
- Puleo performing with Swans in 2014

Background information
- Born: Philip Cary Puleo; September 27, 1963 (age 62)
- Genres: Experimental rock; post-punk; industrial; folk
- Occupations: Musician, visual artist
- Instruments: Drums; percussion; dulcimer; keyboards
- Years active: 1987–present
- Label: Young God Records
- Member of: Swans
- Formerly of: Angels of Light; Cop Shoot Cop; Red Expendables
- Website: philpuleo.com

Philip Cary Puleo (born September 27, 1963) is an American composer, drummer, illustrator and visual artist from New York. He is known as a founding member of the band Cop Shoot Cop in the 1990s, and for his current involvement in the experimental rock group Swans. He has also collaborated with Swans leader Michael Gira on his Angels of Light musical project. After briefly touring with Swans during the mid-nineties, Puleo joined the band as a full-time member in 2010.

== Discography ==
Cop Shoot Cop

Year	Name	Ref
1989	Headkick Facsimile	
1989	PieceMan EP	
1990	Consumer Revolt	
1991	White Noise	
1992	Suck City	
1993	Ask Questions Later	
1994	Release	

Red Expendables

Year	Name	Ref
1997	Red Expendables	

Swans

Year	Name	Ref
1998	Swans Are Dead	
2010	My Father Will Guide Me up a Rope to the Sky	
2012	The Seer	
2014	To Be Kind	
2016	The Glowing Man	
2019	Leaving Meaning	
2023	The Beggar	
2025	Birthing	

Other appearances

Year	Name	Artist	Ref
1999	New Mother	Angels of Light	
1999	Halflife	Phylr	
2007	We Are Him	Angels of Light	
2008	Parplar	Larkin Grimm	
