= David Ouimet =

American musician (born 1965)

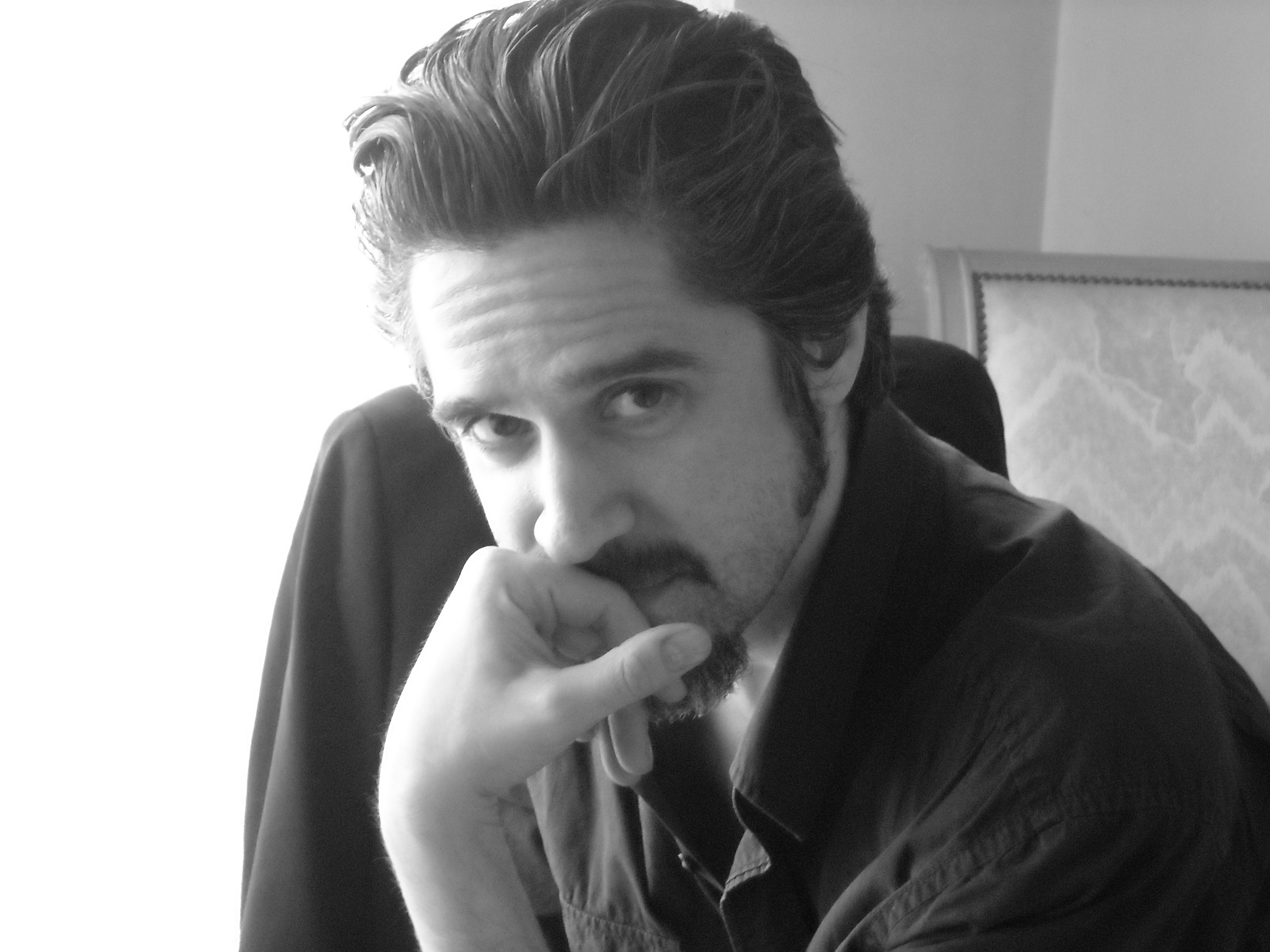

Background information
- Born: 1965 (age 59–60)
- Occupation(s): Musician, author, illustrator
- Instrument(s): Piano, trombone, vocals
- Years active: 1987–2021

David Ouimet (born 1965) is an American artist, author, and musician. He was a band member of Cop Shoot Cop, Motherhead Bug, Firewater, and Sulfur but has since moved on to interests other than music.

He grew up in Memphis, Tennessee, in a music oriented household. Having been introduced to synthesizers in his teenage years, he developed an interest in editing. He studied film at Rhode Island School of Design where he developed a friendship with his future bandmate Tod Ashley.

In the early 1990s, Ouimet co-founded the noise rock group Cop Shoot Cop, playing sampler and keyboards. He left after their first album to form the Gypsy Klezmer Punk outfit Motherhead Bug, as songwriter, vocalist and trombonist. He has also recorded and toured with Foetus and Swans.

Ouimet's illustrations of creepy, bipedal, fez-capped insect creatures (usually wielding scimitars or smoking hookahs) appeared on Motherhead Bug's singles and album, and he has continued his career as an illustrator with Robert D. San Souci's Dare to be Scared series and Nancy Etchmendy's Cat in Glass and other Tales of the Unnatural.

"Daydreams for Night", stories by the Canadian musician John Southworth and illustrated by David Ouimet, was published by Simply Read books in 2015. School Library Journal described the book as "gorgeously illustrated" and Publishers Weekly noted "Ouimet's haunting b&w illustrations follows in the tradition of Shaun Tan's Tales of Suburbia and Chris Van Allsburg's Mysteries of Harris Burdock." Ouimet created an animated trailer for the book.

In 2015 Ouimet began modeling and has appeared in magazines, billboards, and major international print advertising campaigns.

A Japanese edition of "Daydreams for Night" was published by Asuka Shinsha Japan in January 2016.

Ouimet's work was selected for the Society of Illustrators Annual 59 and was exhibited at the Museum of American Illustration in New York City in February 2017.

His street art began appearing in New York City in 2016 and has since appeared throughout the world. Ouimet's primary imagery revolves around his Hoodiebird characters, cloaked birds generally embellished with ornate filagree.

In September 2019 Ouimet's debut book as an author and illustrator, "I Go Quiet", was published in the UK, Australia, New Zealand, South Africa and India by Canongate Books. In early 2020 the book was published in the U.S. by W.W. Norton, and in a Portuguese edition by Companhia das Letras, A Turkish Edition by Cinar, a German edition by MVG Verlag, an Italian edition by Terre di Mezzo Editore, a Spanish edition by Minotauro, and a Chinese Edition by the CITIC Press Group, among others.

"I Get Loud", the follow-up to "I Go Quiet" was published by Canongate books in the summer of 2021, with numerous translated editions.

"I Go Quiet" was the winner of the 2020 East Sussex Children's Book Award, and was a finalist for the 2021 Kate Greenaway Medal.

In March 2022 “ Eu Fico Em Silencio “, the Brazilian edition of “ I Go Quiet “ was selected for the UNESCO 2021 Books of Distinction.

In March of 2022 David directed his debut animated music video, “ Glide “ from Earth Moon Earth featuring Skye Edwards of the British Band Morcheeba.

In the summer of 2023 David relocated to Europe, where he is working on his next children’s book.

== Bibliography ==
As Illustrator
Year	Title	Author	Publisher
2003	Dare to Be Scared: Thirteen Stories to Chill and Thrill ISBN 978-0812626889	Robert D. San Souci	Cricket Books
2004	Double-Dare to Be Scared: Another Thirteen Chilling Tales	Robert D. San Souci	Cricket Books
2007	Triple-Dare to Be Scared: Thirteen Further Freaky Tales	Robert D. San Souci	Cricket Books
2009	Dare to be Scared 4: Thirteen More Tales of Terror	Robert D. San Souci	Cricket Books
2015	Daydreams for Night	John Southworth	Simply Read

As Author
Year	Title	Author	Publisher
2019	I Go Quiet ISBN 978-1-78689-229-4	David Ouimet	Canongate Books

== Discography ==
Cop Shoot Cop
Year	Name	Ref
1989	Headkick Facsimile	
1989	PieceMan EP	
1990	Consumer Revolt	
1993	Ask Questions Later	
1994	Release	

Motherhead Bug
Year	Name	Ref
1993	Zambodia	

Firewater
Year	Name	Ref
1996	Get Off the Cross, We Need the Wood for the Fire	
1998	The Ponzi Scheme	

Sulfur
Year	Name	Ref
1998	Delirium Tremens	

Other appearances
Year	Name	Artist	Ref
1992	Hunter's Moon	Of Cabbages and Kings	
1992	Male	Foetus in Excelsis Corruptus Deluxe	
1997	York (First Exit to Brooklyn)	The Foetus Symphony Orchestra	
1998	Brooklyn Bank	Here	
1998	Swans Are Dead	Swans	
