= Masami Shinoda =

Japanese alto-saxophonist and composer

Masami Shinoda (1958–1992) was well-known Japanese alto-saxophonist and composer. He began his career in the 1980s and was a member of both Seikatsu Kojo Iinkai Orchestra, and the Japanese band Compostela. His final performance, given in Tokyo in 1992 as a guest saxophonist for the band Cassiber, was released as one half of a double CD called Live in Tokyo (1998). His sudden death also brought about the end of the band Compostela.

== Resources ==
- Billboard Bio
- Bio-site for the band Cassiber.
