= Marcellus Hall =

American artist and musician

Marcellus Hall is an American artist and musician. As an illustrator, Hall has worked for The New Yorker and other publications. As a musician, Hall has performed solo and with bands Railroad Jerk and White Hassle.

== Biography ==
Marcellus Hall was born in Minneapolis, Minnesota, and graduated with a Bachelor of Fine Arts degree from the Rhode Island School of Design where he also learned guitar and harmonica.

=== Illustration ===
As a freelance illustrator, Hall has worked for publications including The Wall Street Journal, The Atlantic, Time, The Christian Science Monitor, New York Magazine, The New York Times, Fortune, and The New Yorker. He first became a New Yorker magazine contributor in 1993 and his first cover was published in 2005. His second in 2008. His third in 2013. And his fourth in 2016. About his fourth cover Hall said "...I did that in 2008 ...it got printed in 2016 ...it took eight years.

In March 2018, Hall published with Bittersweet Editions a debut comic narrative (also known as a graphic novel) called Kaleidoscope City. The book is an existentialist meditation in words and drawings on a year in the life of an unnamed protagonist who seeks meaning through art and city life following the end of a romance. The book earned accolades from actor Bob Odenkirk, comics artist Adrian Tomine, and musician Adam Green.

"I loved this book and it's understandable why people like Adrian Tomine and Bob Odenkirk do too. It's something I haven't seen or felt in a piece of art before. I haven't stopped thinking about it since finishing reading it. This is a nice and refreshing change of pace for comics and a great book for early spring,” said Lenny Schwartz of Forces of Geek. “...a wonderfully unique book.”

“We wake up, trudge to work, eat, sleep, repeat. However, illustrator Marcellus Hall challenges that view of life and beckons us to look at life in a different way in his lyrical, sometimes ethereal, always lovely new graphic novel Kaleidoscope City," said Jed W. Keith of Freak Sugar.

About Kaleidoscope City Hall has said “Life is a lonely business. Religion and art tell stories to make us feel less alone. The fact that we inhale air speaks to our need for air. The fact that we have religion and art speaks to our need for connection. I can’t say why we need connection anymore than why we need air, except to say that we would die without either of them.”

Hall's work has also appeared in The Society of Illustrators, American Illustration, and Communication Arts annuals.

In his first years in New York, Hall also created the weekly comic strip Bill Dogbreath for alternative weekly newspapers that included The Onion, The Seattle Stranger, New York Perspectives, and Baltimore City Paper.

In addition to illustrating the books White Pigeons and 57 Octaves for Fifth Planet Press, Hall has self-published books of drawings and writing including Hard Luck Stories and Legends of the Infinite City (a collection of black & white drawings of New York City).

A selection of Hall's sketches was published in Le Sketch #05, 2008.

In 2008 Hall began illustrating children's books. Among them are Because You Are My Baby (2008) by Sherry North, City I Love (2009) by Lee Bennett Hopkins, Because You Are My Daddy (2010) by Sherry North, The Cow Loves Cookies (2010) by Karma Wilson, Full Moon and Star (2011) by Lee Bennett Hopkins, Because I Am Your Teacher (2012) by Sherry North, What's New? The Zoo! (2014) by Kathleen Krull, and Duddle Puck The Puddle Duck (2015) by Karma Wilson.

In May 2013, Everybody Sleeps, Hall's first children's book as both author and illustrator, was published by Nancy Paulsen Books, an imprint of Penguin.

=== Music ===
Hall was a founding member of and main songwriter for the band Railroad Jerk. The group released four albums on Matador Records and was influential in the blues/punk/folk/grunge genre. The song "Rollerkoaster" from the album One Track Mind appeared on MTV's Beavis and Butthead. The song "Home=Hang" from One Track Mind appeared in the film Day at the Beach from 1997.

After the dissolution of Railroad Jerk, Hall formed the band White Hassle with Railroad Jerk drummer Dave Varenka. Using accompanying guitarists, a theremin player, and a DJ, White Hassle released albums on Matador Records, Fargo Records, Mazri Records, and Orange Recordings. The band toured Europe and America before disbanding in 2006.

Hall has since performed as a solo artist with his band, The Hostages (which includes mainstays Damon Smith and Mike Shapiro, as well as others, including Michael DuClos, Alex Berman, Troy Fannin, Jimmy Ansourian, Joachim Kearns, and Matt Martin). Hall released a debut album, First Line, on Modest Mouse singer Isaac Brock's label Glacial Pace in 2011. The album is accompanied by a 44-page illustrated book.

In 2013 Hall raised money via Kickstarter for the album Afterglow, which was released on December 10, 2013.

In 2024, Hall released I Will Never Let You Down, on Germany's Gutfeeling label, produced by Chris Maxwell. About the long gap between albums, Hall has said, “We wanted to get it right.The pandemic intervened, but we got it right. These are songs about love, loss, hope, and redemption.”

== Discography ==
=== Railroad Jerk ===
- Railroad Jerk discography (1990-2000)

=== White Hassle ===
- White Hassle discography (1997-2005)

=== Solo discography ===
- I Like Walt compilation (1994)
- 4 Track Recordings (1995)
- More 4 Track Recordings (1996)
- The First Line (2011)
- Afterglow (2013)
- I Will Never Let You Down (2024)

== Selected works ==
Illustrator and Author

- Left Turn Only Comics No. 1 (1987)
- The Vast Ranch (1987)
- Lies, Lies, All Lies (1988)
- The Vast Ranch II (1989)
- Scenes from New York (1990)
- The Absolute Truth (1990)
- Hard Luck Stories (1993)
- Legends of the Infinite City (2003)
- Everyone Sleeps (2013)
- Kaleidoscope City (2018)
- Hitchhiker (2018)
- Virtual Reality (2018)
- Multiplicity (2022)

Illustrator only

- Duddle Puck (2015)
- Cow Loves Cookies (1996)
- Because You Are My Baby (2008)
- The Cow Loves Cookies (2010)
- Because You Are My Teacher (2012)
- What's New? The Zoo! (2014)

== Filmography ==
In 2013 Hall appeared in a music video for the song Soulmate. In 2021 Hall appeared in a documentary, Marcellus Hall, An Artist in New York City produced by Fourwind Films & Laura Davi.

- Soulmate (2013)
- Marcellus Hall an Artist in New York City also known as Artist & the City (2021)
