= "Moist" Paula Henderson =

American saxophone player

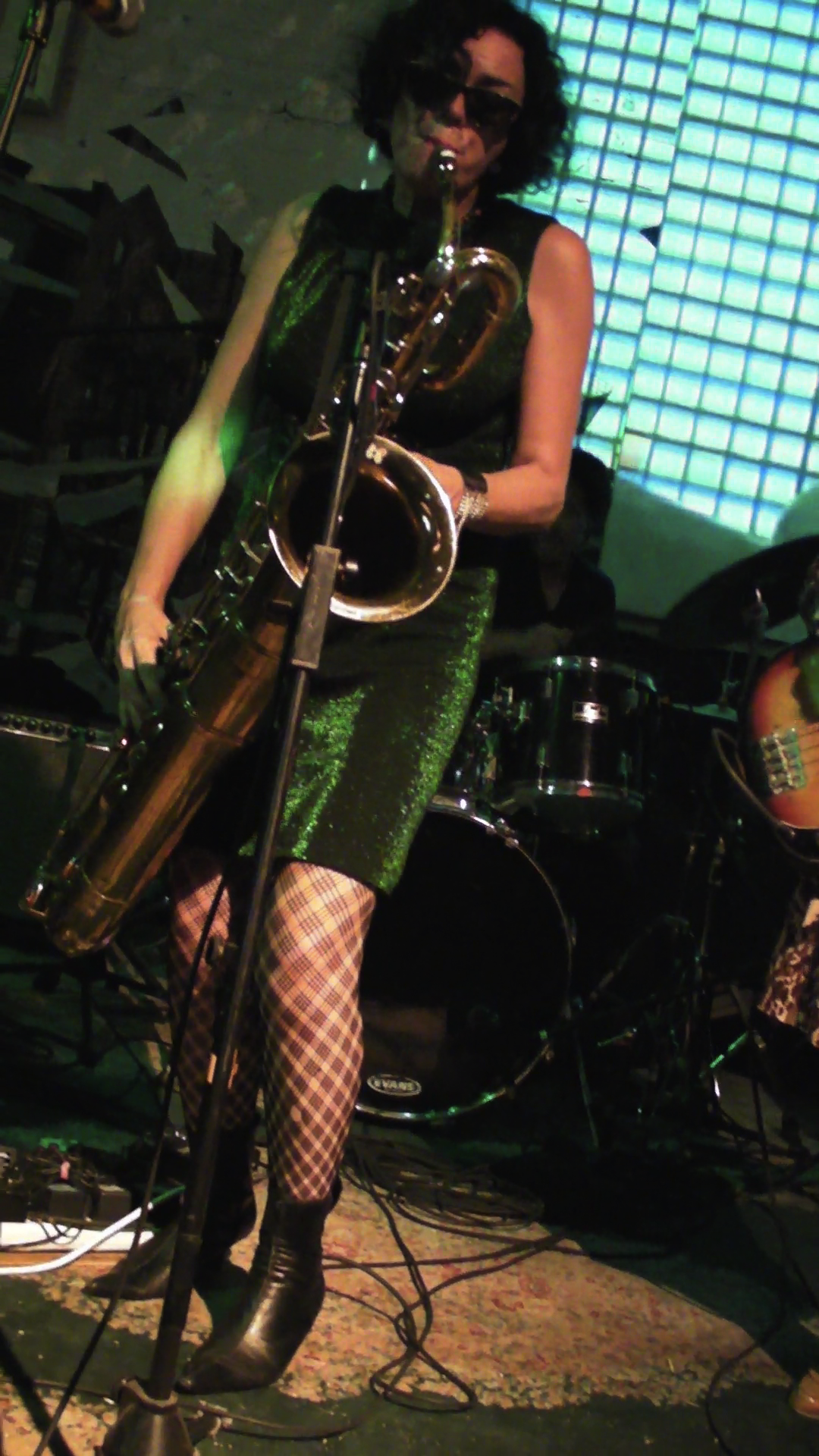
Paula Henderson in 2011

"Moist" Paula Henderson is a New York City based baritone saxophone player. When not touring internationally, she performs weekly in NYC with Reverend Vince Anderson and his Love Choir at Union Pool. Since 2002 she has been a member of Burnt Sugar Arkestra founded by Greg Tate . She was a member of Melvin Van Peebles' group Wid Laxative.

Henderson has toured consistently as part of Nick Waterhouse's live band. Deafen County says of Henderson, "You need to see 'Moist' Paula Henderson on bari sax at least once before you die." The Georgia Straight says of his band The Tarots, "...leading the charge was Paula Henderson, whose green cocktail dress, sparkling emerald shoes, fishnet stockings, and '50s sunglasses were accessorized by a baritone sax the size of a small battleship." Waterhouse refers to Henderson as "his favourite sax player".

She also performs live and in the studio with The Bogmen, The Binky Griptite Orchestra, Meah Pace, Okay Kaya,

She has also played with The Roots, James Chance and the Contortions, Gogol Bordello, C.W. Stoneking, HAIM, Shamir, Smokey Robinson, Irma Thomas, David Johansen, King Kahn, Vernon Reid, and TV On The Radio, with whom she appeared on the David Letterman show.

As a session musician she has appeared on Late Show with David Letterman, Saturday Night Live, The Colbert Report, and Late Night with Jimmy Fallon.

She is a member of Resistance Revival Chorus.

Born and raised in Australia then she relocated to New York in 1995.

== Partial discography ==
- 2007 Secretary
- 2011 Dave "Baby" Cortez With Lonnie Youngblood And His Bloodhounds
- 2012 Melvin Van Peebles – Nahh Nahh Mofo
- 2013 TZAR featuring Moist Paula Live at The Stone NYC
