= Railroad Jerk =

American indie rock band

Railroad Jerk was a New York City–based indie rock band of the 1990s, specializing in a hard-driven punk blues sound.

== History ==
Railroad Jerk's lineup changed frequently, but the core members were Minnesota native Marcellus Hall (vocals, guitar) and North Carolina-born, New Jersey–bred Tony Lee (bass). The two met in Trenton, New Jersey in early 1989 and formed the band with drummer Jez Aspinall and second guitarist Chris Mueller rounding out the quartet. Hall chose the band's name because he "liked the clack and clang of the two words together."

The band gained a following on the Manhattan club scene and were signed to indie label Matador Records, for whom they recorded four albums — all well received critically — before breaking up in the late 1990s.

Their first two albums, Railroad Jerk (1990) and Raise the Plow (1992), did well, but Railroad Jerk reached its biggest success with One Track Mind (1995). The band made two music videos for the record: "Rollerkoaster" and "Bang the Drum", both directed by Jim Spring and Jens Jurgensen.

The "Rollerkoaster" video was shown on MTV's Beavis & Butthead. On tour, the band shared bills with bands including Guided by Voices, Jon Spencer Blues Explosion, Cibo Matto, Girls Against Boys, and Cat Power. "The Ballad of Railroad Jerk" became a college radio hit.

Around the time their fourth album — The Third Rail (1996) was released — the band recorded demos for a fifth Railroad Jerk LP which was to be entitled 'Masterpiecemeal'. This final LP was never released. Dave Varenka and Marcellus Hall went on to form the band White Hassle.

== Discography ==
=== Albums ===
- Railroad Jerk (1990), Matador
- Raise the Plow (1992), Matador
- One Track Mind (1995), Matador
- The Third Rail (1996), Matador

=== Singles and EPs ===
- "Younger Than You" - 7-inch (1991), Matador
- "Milk the Cow" - 2×7″ (1992), PCP Entertainment
- 02.20.93 - 7-inch EP (1993), Walt Records
- "We Understand" - CDEP/2×7″ (1993), Matador
- "Bang the Drum" - CDS/7" (1995), Matador
- Sauberes Hemd - CDEP (1996), Matador
- Railroad Jerk 2001 - 7-inch (2000), Sub Pop
