= Drunk Tank (album) =

Studio album by Drunk Tank
- Released: 1991
- Recorded: March 9 – March 10, 1991
- Studio: Waterfront Studios, NJ
- Genre: Noise rock, post-hardcore
- Length: 27:01
- Label: Radial

Drunk Tank chronology
Drunk Tank (1991)	Missing (1995)

Drunk Tank is the eponymously titled debut studio album of Drunk Tank, released in 1991 by Radial Records. The CD release of the album is appended with tracks taken from the band's first two 7" singles.

== Critical reception ==
Drunk Tank garnered favorable reviews upon its release. Mark Woodlief of Option praised the group for their "unpredictability, sheer raging force and antisociality" and that their music "rattles the innards of the brain, shaking the listener awake to the possibilities of making fingernails on a chalkboard sound darn good." Ian Christie of Alternative Press noted the band's more focused direction and that major label interest might be forthcoming.

== Track listing ==
All tracks are written by Alex Barker, Steven Cerio and Julian Mills.

No.	Title	Length
1.	"Hog Ditch"	2:37
2.	"Diesel Slug"	3:07
3.	"Honeysuckle"	2:13
4.	"End Bits"	3:28
5.	"Pin-Up Girl"	3:46
6.	"Stranger Danger"	2:26
7.	"Nap Time"	2:43
8.	"Lamb's Farm"	4:20
9.	"Freak of Nature"	2:15

CD bonus tracks
No.	Title	Length
10.	"Hayride"	1:55
11.	"Mary Worth"	2:23
12.	"Leadfoot"	2:36
13.	"Scissors"	3:00

== Personnel ==
Adapted from Drunk Tank liner notes.

Drunk Tank

- Alex Barker – electric guitar
- Steven Cerio – drums
- Julian Mills – vocals, bass guitar

Production and additional personnel

- Steve Albini – recording
- Laura Brem – cover art

== Release history ==
Region	Date	Label	Format	Catalog
United States	1991	Radial	CD, CS, LP	RDL 03
