= Jim Coleman (musician) =

American musician

James F. Coleman is an American musician who plays keyboards and sampler. He was a member of the 1990s noise rock band Cop Shoot Cop, and afterwards worked as a solo musician specializing in instrumental electronic music and film scores.

== Biography ==
He was a founding member of New York's Cop Shoot Cop, and performed under a variety of stage names: Cripple Jim (he toured on crutches due to a broken leg), and usually as Filer. For most of their existence the band had two bassists and no guitar, leaving Coleman's keyboards to occupy much of the middle-frequency range normally filled by a guitarist in a rock band. Coleman's use of found sounds and other unusual noises was described as "inventive" by critics Art Black David Sprague of Trouser Press. On Release (1994), Cop Shoot Cop's final album, Coleman relied more on conventional piano playing rather than his early sample-based approach.

He has recorded solo albums as Phylr and the closely related project Here (with Teho Teardo) and collaborates with JG Thirlwell as Baby Zizanie.

Coleman released the ambient album Trees (2012) under his own name. He has been doing sporadic live shows of this material in Europe and the US.

Additionally, Coleman has scored a good number of indie films and TV series. Indie features emerging in 2014 are "Exposed" by Beth B and "Stay Then Go" by Shelli Ainsworth. He has worked with directors such as Todd Phillips, Hal Hartley, Richard Kern and Danny Leitner.

Coleman is currently working on a number of music tracks that are based on recordings of people's near death experiences.

In 2018–2019, Coleman co-formed a new group called Human Impact.

In 2024, Coleman co-founded Deaf Doula, with Ev Gold of Cinema Cinema. They released their debut single, "2057", in late 2025.
