= Big Cat Records =

British independent record label

- Founded: 1990
- Country of origin: United States
- Location: New York City

Big Cat Records is a British independent record label. It launched around 1990 and originally specialized in industrial and noise-rock releases. Big Cat operated a US office in New York City for a few years. Integrated with V2 Records in 1996, at which point their roster became much more diverse in style. Artists include Carter The Unstoppable Sex Machine, Cop Shoot Cop, Foetus, Heather Nova, Paul Schütze, Pavement, Shudder To Think, Lotion, Corduroy, Junior Delgado, Blumfeld, Broken Dog, Experimental Audio Research, One Minute Silence and Grandaddy.

After V2 Records took over many of the artists, the remnants of Big Cat (UK) Records was sold in 2011. In 2018 Jungle Records purchased the residual label assets, including for Carter USM and others.
