= Forever Burned =

Compilation album by Swans
- Released: 2003
- Length: 74:16
- Label: Young God Records
- Producer: Bill Laswell; Michael Gira; Roli Mosimann; J. G. Thirlwell

Swans chronology
Various Failures (1999)	Forever Burned (2003)	My Father Will Guide Me Up a Rope to the Sky (2010)

Forever Burned is the tenth compilation album by American experimental rock band Swans. It was given a limited release through the Young God Records website. It featured the entire The Burning World album followed by a few songs from White Light from the Mouth of Infinity, Love of Life and the Michael Gira version of Love Will Tear Us Apart. Tracks 1 to 10 are from The Burning World.

The record is out-of-print and no longer available from the Young God Records website.

== Track listing ==
Tracks 15 and 16 are listed in the reverse order that they appear on the CD.

No.	Title	Origin	Length
1.	"The River that Runs with Love Won't Run Dry"	The Burning World (1989)	4:16
2.	"Let it Come Down"	The Burning World (1989)	4:28
3.	"Can't Find My Way Home"	The Burning World (1989)	4:48
4.	"Mona Lisa, Mother Earth"	The Burning World (1989)	4:16
5.	"(She's a) Universal Emptiness"	The Burning World (1989)	5:16
6.	"Saved"	The Burning World (1989)	4:11
7.	"I Remember Who You Are"	The Burning World (1989)	4:24
8.	"Jane Mary, Cry One Tear"	The Burning World (1989)	3:48
9.	"See No More"	The Burning World (1989)	5:30
10.	"God Damn the Sun"	The Burning World (1989)	4:23
11.	"The Sound of Freedom"	Love of Life (1992)	4:28
12.	"No Cure for the Lonely"	Love of Life (1992)	2:51
13.	"Love of Life"	Love of Life (1992)	3:36
14.	"God Loves America"	Love of Life (1992)	3:41
15.	"Song for the Sun"	White Light From The Mouth Of Infinity (1991)	5:03
16.	"Power and Sacrifice"	White Light From The Mouth Of Infinity (1991)	5:37
17.	"Love Will Tear Us Apart"	Love Will Tear Us Apart EP (1988)	3:40
Total length:			74:16

== Personnel ==
- Michael Gira – vocals and guitars
- Jarboe – vocals and keyboards
- Norman Westberg – guitars
- Christopher Hahn – guitars
- Jenny Wade – bass
- Vincent Signorelli – drums
- Algis Kizys – bass
- Virgil Moorefield – drums
- Jason Anses – bass
- Nicky Skopelitis – baglama and bazouki
- Shankar – double violin
- Bill Laswell – bass
- Fred Frith – violin
- Aiyb Dieng – percussion
- Trilok Gurtu – tablas
- Karl Berger – vibes, string arrangement
- Ted Parsons – drums
- Anton Fier – drums
- Hahn Rowe – violin
- J. G. Thirlwell – backing vocals
- Mark Feldman & Larry Packer – violins
- John Kass & Richard Carr – violas
- Garo Yellin – cello
