= Public Castration Is a Good Idea =

1986 live album by Swans

Live album by Swans
- Released: 1986
- Recorded: February–March 1986
- Venues: ICA, London (tracks 1–6); The Garage, Nottingham (track 7); ULU, London (track 8)
- Genres: No wave; noise rock
- Length: 73:56
- Labels: Some Bizzare Records; Thirsty Ear Recordings
- Producer: Michael Gira

Swans chronology
Holy Money (1986)	Public Castration Is a Good Idea (1986)	Children of God (1987)

Professional ratings
Review scores
Source	Rating
AllMusic	4.5/5 stars
Alternative Press	4/5 stars
Pitchfork	(6.0/10)

Public Castration Is a Good Idea is the first live album by American experimental rock band Swans. It was originally released as a semi-officially approved bootleg through Some Bizzare Records in 1986, consisting of performances recorded from shows in London and Nottingham on the tour for the albums Greed and Holy Money. The performances were recorded from London's ICA, The Garage in Nottingham and London's ULU.

The CD edition, released by Thirsty Ear on July 6, 1999, was mastered from a vinyl source. An accompanying videocassette (betamax and VHS editions) of the same tour (both containing set lists that are identical to the LP) was released called A Long Slow Screw.

== Track listing ==
No.	Title	Also on	Length
1.	"Money Is Flesh"	Greed and Holy Money (as "Money Is Flesh #2")	12:06
2.	"Fool"	Greed and Holy Money (as "Fool #2")	8:08
3.	"A Screw"	A Screw and Holy Money	7:27
4.	"Anything for You"	Greed	9:09
5.	"Coward"	Holy Money	8:33
6.	"A Hanging"	Holy Money	12:32
7.	"Stupid Child"	Greed	5:41
8.	"Another You"	Holy Money	10:16
Total length:			73:56

== Personnel ==
- Michael Gira
- Norman Westberg
- Algis Kizys
- Jarboe
- Ronaldo Gonzalez
- Ted Parsons
- Jack Balchin - sound technician
