= Various Failures =

1999 compilation album by Swans

Compilation album by Swans
- Released: March 22, 1999
- Recorded: 1988–1992
- Length: 153:54
- Label: Young God Records

Swans chronology
Swans Are Dead (1998)	Various Failures (1999)	Forever Burned (2003)

Professional ratings
Review scores
Source	Rating
Allmusic	4/5 stars

Various Failures is the eighth compilation album by American experimental rock band Swans. It was released on March 22, 1999, and contains tracks from White Light from the Mouth of Infinity, Love of Life, The Burning World, and The World of Skin's Ten Songs for Another World. In addition, it contains B-sides, rarities, and previously unreleased tracks.

The album was re-released in 2000. The second disc of this edition dropped "Can't Find My Way Home", the Jarboe version of "Love Will Tear Us Apart" and the acoustic version of "New Mind". "The Sound of Freedom" from Love of Life and "Saved" from The Burning World replaced the aforementioned tracks.

The only unreleased tracks featured on this compilation (besides some songs that have been faded in/out) are a longer version of "Why Are We Alive", an instrumental version of "The Most Unfortunate Lie" (listed on this album as "Unfortunate Lie") and a demo version of "When She Breathes". The acoustic version of "New Mind" and the Jarboe version of "Love Will Tear Us Apart" had never been previously available on CD.

== Track listing ==
Disc one (Yellow CD; Young God Records 1999)
No.	Title	Originally released on	Length
1.	"Miracle of Love"	White Light from the Mouth of Infinity (1991)	6:25
2.	"Black Eyed Dog"	Ten Songs for Another World by World of Skin (1990)	4:00
3.	"The Golden Boy That Was Swallowed by the Sea" (includes "(---)" track 4)	Love of Life (1992)	5:10
4.	"(---)" (track 5)	Love of Life (1992)	2:06
5.	"I Remember Who You Are"	The Burning World (1989)	4:24
6.	"Her"	Love of Life (1992)	5:23
7.	"No Cruel Angel"	"Saved" single (1989)	4:28
8.	"When She Breathes" (alternate version)	White Light from the Mouth of Infinity (originally) (1991)	4:30
9.	"Why Are We Alive?" (alternate version)	White Light from the Mouth of Infinity (originally) (1991)	6:05
10.	"The Child's Right"	Ten Songs for Another World by World of Skin (1990)	3:35
11.	"(---)" (track 16)	Love of Life (1992)	1:03
12.	"The Other Side of the World"	Love of Life (1992)	4:40
13.	"Song For Dead Time" (M. Gira version)	"Love of Life"/"Amnesia" single (1992)	4:34
14.	"Love Will Save You"	White Light from the Mouth of Infinity (1991)	6:05
15.	"Blind"	Drainland by Michael Gira (1995)	4:30
16.	"Unfortunate Lie" (instrumental version)	White Light from the Mouth of Infinity (originally) (1991)	2:20
17.	"Was He Ever Alive?"	"Can't Find My Way Home" single (1989)	6:25

Disc two (Red CD; Young God Records 1999)
No.	Title	Originally released on	Length
1.	"Failure"	White Light from the Mouth of Infinity (1991)	6:20
2.	"Identity" (includes "(---)" track 12)	Love of Life (1992)	5:34
3.	"Can't Find My Way Home" (replaced with "Sound of Freedom" on reissue)	The Burning World (1989) / Love of Life (1992)	4:48
4.	"Trust Me" (alternate version)	Love Will Tear Us Apart EP (1988)	4:20
5.	"Better Than You"	White Light from the Mouth of Infinity (1991)	5:58
6.	"Love Will Tear Us Apart" (Jarboe version) (replaced with "Saved" on reissue)	Love Will Tear Us Apart EP (1988) / The Burning World (1989)	3:44
7.	"Will We Survive"	White Light from the Mouth of Infinity (1991)	5:56
8.	"Drink to Me Only With Thine Eyes" (edit)	Ten Songs for Another World by World of Skin (1990)	1:16
9.	"God Damn the Sun"	The Burning World (1989)	4:20
10.	"Eyes of Nature"	Love of Life (1992)	4:40
11.	"You Know Everything"	"Celebrity Lifestyle" single (1995)	4:26
12.	"Song for Dead Time" (Jarboe version; edit)	White Light from the Mouth of Infinity (originally) (1991)	5:00
13.	"Picture of Maryanne"	"Love of Life/Amnesia" single (1992)	4:22
14.	"Amnesia" (edit)	Love of Life (1992)	3:42
15.	"Dream Dream"	Ten Songs for Another World by World of Skin (1990)	5:32
16.	"Please Remember Me"	Ten Songs for Another World by World of Skin (1990)	4:48
17.	"New Mind" (acoustic version) (not included on reissue)	Love Will Tear Us Apart EP (1988)	3:26
Total length:			153:54
