= Body to Body, Job to Job =

1991 compilation album by Swans

Compilation album by Swans
- Released: November 4, 1991
- Recorded: 1982–85
- Studio: Omnipotent Studios (New York City, New York); CBGB's (New York City, New York); Sin Club (New York City, New York)
- Genre: Experimental rock, no wave, noise rock, industrial
- Length: 64:14
- Label: Young God
- Producer: Michael Gira

Swans chronology
White Light from the Mouth of Infinity (1991)	Body to Body, Job to Job (1991)	Love of Life (1992)

Professional ratings
Review scores
Source	Rating
Allmusic	2.5/5 stars
Spin Alternative Record Guide	5/10

Body to Body, Job to Job (stylized on the cover as Body To Body Job To Job.) is the third compilation album by the American experimental rock band Swans. It was released simultaneously on LP, CD and cassette in 1991. It presents various live recordings, tape loops and previously unavailable material recorded between 1982 and 1985. The title is taken from the song "Job".

== Release history ==
While the original CDs and audio cassettes contained 16 songs, the LP version – due to the limited length of the medium – omitted 4 songs: "Whore", "Loop 21", "Get Out" and "Mother, My Body Disgusts Me".

While the album, in its initial form, would eventually go out of print, it has been reissued various times. It was included on the double-disc set Filth/Body to Body, Job to Job in 2000 (which also included the band's 1983 recording Filth), and it was also included in the 2015 deluxe triple-disc reissue of Filth. Both Filth/Body to Body, Job to Job and the 2015 reissue of Filth containing Body to Body, Job to Job add "Raping a Slave (Live Berlin 1984)" as a bonus track after the end of "Thug".

== Content ==
"Whore" was originally released on the album Cop in 1984 as "Butcher"; the disparity indicates that the song's title may have been taken from an early setlist. "Your Game" is an early version of the song "Your Property," which originally appeared on Cop as well; the lyric at this time was a spoken word piece titled "Your Game" that was later collected in Gira's book The Consumer. "Mother, My Body Disgusts Me" is an early version of the title track from Greed, with different lyrics. The recordings used for the album were remastered by Gira at B. Monster Studios, New York City.

The CD and cassette edition track listings reveal the year of origin for each track, with the exception of "Loop 33".

== Track listing ==
All tracks are written by Michael Gira.

No.	Title	Year of Origin	Length
1.	"I'll Cry for You"	1985	5:41
2.	"Red Sheet" (live)	1982	3:11
3.	"Loop 33"	N/A	0:59
4.	"Your Game"	1984	3:57
5.	"Seal It Over"	1983	3:48
6.	"Whore" (live)	1984	3:56
7.	"We'll Hang for That"	1982	3:55
8.	"Half Life" (live)	1984	3:57
9.	"Loop 21"	1982	1:26
10.	"Get Out"	1984	3:31
11.	"Job" (live)	1984	5:40
12.	"Loop 1"	1983	1:01
13.	"Mother, My Body Disgusts Me"	1985	4:52
14.	"Cop" (live)	1984	5:56
15.	"Only I Can Hear, Only I Can Touch"	1982	2:41
16.	"Thug" (live)	1984	9:44

== Personnel ==
Credits adapted from liner notes for Body to Body, Job to Job.

Swans

- Michael Gira
- Norman Westberg
- Harry Crosby
- Sue Hanel
- Roli Mossimann
- Mojo
- Dan Braun
- Thurston Moore
- Craig Crafton
- Jonathan Kane
- Ted Parsons
- Ronaldo Gonzalez
- Ivan Nahem
- Algis Kizys
- Jarboe
- Bob Pezzola
- Johnathan Prosser

Production

- Michael Gira – production, remastering, cover design
- Bryce Goggin – engineering
- Catherine Ceresole – recording (tracks 2, 6, 10, and 15)
- Nathan Ceresole – recording (tracks 2, 6, 10, and 15)
- John Erskine – recording (tracks 6, 8, 11, 14, and 16)
- Patricia Mooney – layout
