= Love of Life (album) =

1992 album by Swans

Studio album by Swans
- Released: February 1992
- Recorded: October–December 1991
- Studio: B.C. Studios (Brooklyn, New York)
- Genre: Gothic rock; neofolk; psychedelic rock
- Length: 53:58
- Label: Young God
- Producer: Michael Gira

Swans chronology
Body to Body, Job to Job (1991)	Love of Life (1992)	Omniscience (1992)

Singles from Love of Life
- 1. "Love of Life" / "Amnesia" Released: 1992

Love of Life is the eighth studio album by American experimental rock band Swans. It was released in February 1992 on Young God Records.

== Background ==
Like its predecessor, White Light from the Mouth of Infinity, Love of Life was out of print for a long time and had not been reissued until December 2015. Six of the eleven songs appear on the Various Failures compilation, and a further four appear on the Forever Burned compilation. These two compilations therefore contain all the material on this release, except the Jarboe composition "She Cries (For Spider)", as well as tracks 1 and 9. Love of Life is the only Swans album to date to not feature guitarist Norman Westberg in any capacity.

The cover art is a painting by Deryk Thomas. All of the untitled segues, listed as both "(—)" and "(---)", are credited to the band Beautiful People LTD, which is a one-off collaboration between Jarboe and then-Swans bass player Lary 7.

== Critical reception ==
Professional ratings
Review scores
Source	Rating
AllMusic	3/5 stars
Ondarock	6.5/10
Pitchfork	8.0/10
Spin Alternative Record Guide	6.0/10

Trouser Press wrote, "Not as stunning in its passion as the band's best work, Love of Life is still an often beautiful, haunting record." AllMusic wrote, "Love of Life unsurprisingly proves to be yet another Swans masterpiece."

== Track listing ==
All tracks are written by Michael Gira, except where indicated.

No.	Title	Writer(s)	Length
1.	"(---)"	Jarboe, Lary Seven	0:17
2.	"Love of Life"		3:41
3.	"The Golden Boy That Was Swallowed by the Sea"		4:32
4.	"(---)"	Jarboe, Seven	0:37
5.	"(---)"	Jarboe, Seven	2:06
6.	"The Other Side of the World"	Gira, Jarboe	4:40
7.	"Her"		5:24
8.	"The Sound of Freedom"		4:34
9.	"(---)"	Jarboe, Seven	0:34
10.	"Amnesia"		4:19
11.	"Identity"		4:31
12.	"(---)"	Jarboe, Seven	1:02
13.	"In the Eyes of Nature"		4:42
14.	"She Cries (For Spider)"	Jarboe	4:57
15.	"God Loves America"		3:43
16.	"(---)"	Jarboe, Seven	1:20
17.	"No Cure for the Lonely" (this track is not present on all vinyl releases)		2:56
Total length:			53:58

2015 Bonus CD

All tracks are written by Michael Gira, except track 9 (Nick Drake), track 13 (Jarboe), track 15 (traditional).

No.	Title	Source	Length
1.	"Amnesia (Long)"	"Love of Life"/"Amnesia" single (1992)	7:42
2.	"Song for Dead Time" (M. Gira version)	"Love of Life"/"Amnesia" single	4:34
3.	"You Know Everything (Reprise 1990)"	"Celebrity Lifestyle" single (1994)	4:25
4.	"Mother's Milk (live)"	Omniscience (1992)	4:37
5.	"The Child's Right"	World of Skin's Ten Songs for Another World (1990)	3:36
6.	"Love of Life (Short)"	"Love of Life"/"Amnesia" single	3:20
7.	"Unfortunate Lie (Instrumental Version)"	Various Failures (1999)	2:18
8.	"No Cruel Angel"	"Saved" single (1989)	4:29
9.	"Black Eyed Dog"	World of Skin's Ten Songs for Another World	3:48
10.	"Love of Life (Long)"	"Love of Life"/"Amnesia" single	6:07
11.	"Picture of Maryanne"	"Love of Life"/"Amnesia" single	4:22
12.	"Amnesia (live)"	Omniscience	6:20
13.	"Dream Dream"	World of Skin's Ten Songs for Another World	5:32
14.	"Please Remember Me"	World of Skin's Ten Songs for Another World	4:37
15.	"Drink to Me Only With Thine Eyes" (edit)	World of Skin's Ten Songs for Another World	1:18
16.	"The Unknown (live)"	previously unreleased from 1988-89 tour	6:45
17.	"Blood on Your Hands (live)"	Anonymous Bodies in an Empty Room (1990)	3:11
18.	"A Young Girl Needs (live)"	Anonymous Bodies in an Empty Room	2:35

== Personnel ==
- Michael Gira – vocals, guitar, acoustic guitar, samples, production, sleeve artwork concept and design
- Jarboe – vocals, keyboards, backing vocals, mellotron
- Clinton Steele – guitar, acoustic guitar
- Algis Kizys – bass guitar
- Vincent Signorelli – drums
- Jenny Wade – bass
- Ted Parsons – drums
- Troy Gregory – bass guitar
- Larry Seven – bass guitar, guitar
- Adam Jankowski – narration on "Identity"
- Martin Bisi – engineering, additional programming
- Howie Weinberg – mastering
- Mark Richardson – additional recording
- Deryk Thomas – front cover illustration
- Larry Lame – sleeve photography
- Patricia Mooney – sleeve artwork and layout
