= Young God (EP) =

EP by Swans
- Released: 1984
- Recorded: May 1984
- Studio: Platinum, Zurich, Switzerland
- Genre: Industrial; experimental
- Length: 24:32
- Label: K.422
- Producer: Michael Gira; Roli Mosimann

Swans chronology
Cop (1984)	Young God (1984)	Greed (1986)

Professional ratings
Review scores
Source	Rating
AllMusic	4/5 stars
Spin Alternative Record Guide	6/10

Young God is the second EP by the American experimental rock band Swans. Released in 1984, it was issued through the record label K.422. Although also referred to as "Raping a Slave" and "I Crawled", the band officially recognizes it as Young God. Similar to Cop, the cover art features a notice stating that the record is "designed to be played at maximum volume."

== Background ==
Young God is widely regarded by critics as one of Swans' most brutal releases, similar in sound to the band's first two albums, Filth (1983) and Cop (1984), but slightly more experimental. The subject matter is exemplified by the title track, which is written from the perspective of serial killer Ed Gein. A notable element of the release is the use of unconventional percussion elements, including a chain and metal table, which has led critics to categorize the album as industrial and experimental music. The EP was recorded during the final recording sessions for Cop.

== Release and legacy ==
The EP sold around 1,000 copies in its first year, making it K.422's highest-selling record. In 1992, the entire recording was released as bonus tracks to the compact disc edition of the Cop LP, and the entirety of that edition would be released as the first disc to the double disc compilation Cop/Young God/Greed/Holy Money.

Kurt Cobain included it (under the name of "Raping a Slave") as his fiftieth favorite album on one of his last "50 Favorite Albums" lists in his Journals. The Swiss band the Young Gods took their name from this EP.

Justin Broadrick of Godflesh cited Young God as a key inspiration for his music. About the EP, he said:

"The first Swans record I owned was [the Young God] EP, and it absolutely blew me away... it was a sound that I always wanted to hear, just the bleakest and blackest. The minimalist approach of the music, that was what really influenced me. It was non-genre-specific, with a total lack of baggage... purely abstract, surreal, and violent. It communicated to me in a very special way, and taught me that heavy metal could be stripped of everything and reduced to its most primal form."

== Track listing ==
All lyrics are written by Michael Gira; all music is composed by Swans.

Young God track listing
No.	Title	Length
1.	"I Crawled"	5:40
2.	"Raping a Slave"	6:22
3.	"Young God"	7:03
4.	"This Is Mine"	5:24
Total length:		24:42

== Personnel ==
- Michael Gira – vocals, tapes, production, sleeve design
- Harry Crosby – bass guitar
- Roli Mosimann – drums, tapes, production
- Norman Westberg – guitar
- H. Lombardi – engineering
- Voco – engineering
- Repul. H. L. – sleeve artwork
- J. Erskine – technical assistance

== Charts ==
Chart performance for Young God
Chart (1985)	Peak position
UK Indie Chart	9
