= Grab the Wheel =

Grab the Wheel may refer to:

- "Grab the Wheel", 2002 song by The Heroine Sheiks from the album Siamese Pipe
- "Grab the Wheel", 2016 song by Lil Uzi Vert from their mixtape Lil Uzi Vert vs. the World
- "Grab the Wheel", 2017 song by Timbaland

== See also ==
- "Somebody Grab the Wheel", 2015 song by Whitey
