= Number One of Three =

Studio album by The Body Lovers
- Released: April 21, 1998
- Recorded: BC Studio, Brooklyn, NY; Ethel Sound, Atlanta, GA
- Genre: Drone
- Length: 73:25
- Label: Atavistic/Young God
- Producer: Michael Gira

The Body Lovers / The Body Haters chronology
Number One of Three (1998)	34:13 (1999)

Professional ratings
Review scores
Source	Rating
Allmusic	4.5/5 stars
Pitchfork Media	(6.2/10)

Number One of Three is the first studio album of the project The Body Lovers / The Body Haters, released on April 21, 1998, by Atavistic and Young God Records. The album was released under the name "The Body Lovers". Last Sigh Magazine gave the album a positive write-up and said "there are VERY few things I've ever heard quite this enigmatic and beautiful."

== Track listing ==
All music is composed by Michael Gira.

No.	Title	Length
1.	Untitled	13:56
2.	Untitled	5:32
3.	Untitled	10:00
4.	Untitled	6:13
5.	Untitled	5:01
6.	Untitled	5:20
7.	Untitled	3:53
8.	Untitled	8:51
9.	Untitled	8:58
10.	Untitled	5:40

== Personnel ==
Adapted from the Number One of Three liner notes.

- Michael Gira – acoustic guitar, electric guitar, harmonica, keyboards, vocals, musical arrangement, production

Additional musicians

- Bill Bronson – bass guitar, melodica
- Thomas Dodd – Celtic harp
- Kris Force – viola, violin
- Jarboe – backing vocals
- James Plotkin – electric guitar
- Phil Puleo – drums, percussion, bells, dulcimer
- Kurt Ralske – flugelhorn
- Bill Rieflin – piano
- Birgit Staudt – accordion
- Norman Westberg – electric guitar
- Tore Honoré Bøe – effects
- Irene – backing vocals
- Ole Henrik Moe – effects
- Ryland Walker Patterson – backing vocals
- Helge Sten – effects
- Mika Vainio – effects

Technical personnel

- Martin Bisi – engineering, programming, keyboards
- Chris Griffin – engineering
- Mike Moore – assistant engineer
- Clinton Steele – engineering
- Palmer Wood – assistant engineer

== Release history ==
Region	Date	Label	Format	Catalog
United States	1998	Atavistic/Young God	CD	ALP103, YG05
