= Jew jitsu =

Jew Jitsu may refer to:

- Jew-Jitsu: The Hebrew Hands Of Fury, 2008 book by Paul Kupperberg
- "Jew Jitsu", track from the 2000 album Rape on the Installment Plan by The Heroine Sheiks
- "Jew-Jitsu", a skill of playable class Jew in South Park: The Stick of Truth

== See also ==
- Jiu Jitsu, Japanese martial art
- Jiu Jitsu (film), 2020 science fiction martial arts film
