= John Fell =

John Fell may refer to:

- John Fell (bishop) (1625–1686), Bishop of Oxford
- John Fell (tutor) (1735–1797), English congregationalist minister and classical tutor
- John Fell (judge) (1721–1798), American farmer and jurist
- John Barraclough Fell (1815–1902), British railway engineer
- John Fell (Canadian politician) (1819–1901), Ontario businessman, farmer and political figure
- John Fell (industrialist), Scottish-Australian pioneer of the Australian oil shale and oil refining industries
- John Fell (drummer) (born 1961), American drummer
