= Holy Money =

1986 studio album by Swans

Studio album by Swans
- Released: March 27, 1986
- Recorded: June 1985 – January 1986
- Studio: Intergalactic (New York City)
- Genre: Industrial
- Length: 35:50
- Label: K.422
- Producers: Michael Gira; Jorgé Estabon

Swans chronology
Greed (1986)	Holy Money (1986)	Public Castration Is a Good Idea (1986)

Singles from Holy Money
- 1. "A Screw" Released: May 2, 1986

Holy Money is the fourth studio album by American experimental rock band Swans. It was released in March 1986, through record label K.422. The album was recorded in the same sessions as "Time Is Money (Bastard)", "A Screw", and Greed.

== Background ==
The first CD issue contained the A Screw single as bonus tracks. A later compilation released in 1992, Greed / Holy Money, combined Holy Money (barring "A Screw (Holy Money)", though "A Screw (Holy Money) (Mix)" was listed as this) and Greed (barring "Fool" and "Money Is Flesh", however "Fool (#2)" and "Money Is Flesh (#2)" were listed as these, respectively), as well as the entirety of the A Screw single and an abridged version of "Time Is Money (Bastard) (Mix)" (listed as "Time Is Money (Bastard)") from the Time Is Money (Bastard) EP. This compilation, with its entirely re-organized track list, saw re-issue in 1999 in the double-disc set Cop/Young God / Greed/Holy Money, which included the Cop album and Young God EP.

== Critical reception ==
Professional ratings
Review scores
Source	Rating
AllMusic	4.5/5 stars
Ondarock	6.5/10
Spin Alternative Record Guide	7/10

AllMusic commented that Holy Money "well documents the continuing transformation of Swans into a more complex, intriguing beast." Trouser Press called it "more or less a twin to Greed; virtually identical in cover art and musical approach". Aaron Lariviere of Stereogum described Holy Money as a "transitional album", but called it "brilliant in [its] own right". Maynard James Keenan of Tool named the album as a major influence.

== Track listing ==
No.	Title	Length
1.	"A Hanging"	5:48
2.	"You Need Me"	1:23
3.	"Fool (#2)"	5:54
4.	"A Screw (Holy Money)"	5:00
5.	"Another You"	7:43
6.	"Money Is Flesh (#2)"	5:02
7.	"Coward"	5:10
Total length:		36:00

CD bonus tracks: A Screw
No.	Title	Length
8.	"A Screw"	5:41
9.	"Blackmail"	4:54
10.	"A Screw (Holy Money)" (Mix)	5:00
Total length:		51:35

== Personnel ==
Credits adapted from Holy Money liner notes

Performers

- Michael Gira – vocals, piano, sampling, production
- Norman Westberg – guitar
- Jarboe – vocals (tracks 1 and 2)
- Algis Kizys – bass (tracks 1 and 4)
- Harry Crosby – bass (tracks 3, 5, and 6)
- Ronald Gonzales – drums (track 1, 5, 6, and 7)
- Ted Parsons – drums (tracks 1 and 4)
- Ivan Nahem – drums (track 3)

Additional personnel

- Roli Mosimann – mixing (track 4)
- Jorgé Estabon – engineering, production
- Paul White – artwork

== Charts ==
Chart (1986)	Peak position
UK Indie Chart	6
