= My Father Will Guide Me up a Rope to the Sky =

Studio album by Swans
- Released: September 23, 2010
- Recorded: 2009–2010
- Genre: Post-rock
- Length: 44:21; 90:28 (Special Edition)
- Language: English
- Label: Young God
- Producer: Michael Gira

Swans chronology
Forever Burned (2003)	My Father Will Guide Me up a Rope to the Sky (2010)	We Rose from Your Bed with the Sun in Our Head (2012)

Limited deluxe edition
- Released in 2010

My Father Will Guide Me up a Rope to the Sky is the eleventh studio album by American rock band Swans released on September 23, 2010; it was their first studio recording in 14 years. Swans founder Michael Gira funded the recording of this album by creating the limited-edition album I Am Not Insane and chose several collaborators from previous Swans line-ups as well as his side project Angels of Light to record and tour for this album. My Father Will Guide Me up a Rope to the Sky has received positive critical feedback for the return of Swans as well as the rich spiritual themes of the lyrics.

== Recording ==
In a 2009 interview, Gira hinted at the prospect of resurrecting the Swans project. Later that year, many of the tracks that would appear on My Father Will Guide Me up a Rope to the Sky were released in demo and acoustic form on I Am Not Insane and sold in order to fund the recording process for this album. Gira handmade 1,000 copies of that album to fund the new Swans recordings. In January 2010, Gira amended the band's Facebook and MySpace to read "SWANS ARE NOT DEAD"—an announcement that the band had been reformed as well as a play on words from Swans' live album Swans Are Dead.

Gira wrote the songs over a three-year period and decided that they were unfit for an Angels of Light album and he wanted to transition back the aggressive sound and "sonic intensity" of Swans; he briefly considered releasing the material as an Angels of Light/Swans split album, but decided against it. After Gira financed the album through sales of I Am Not Insane, he got together a group of musicians to record with him in New York. Each song—with the exception of "You Fucking People Make Me Sick"—was recorded in 12-hour daily studio sessions that culminated in nighttime overdubs.

In deciding to reform Swans, Gira attempted to create a continuity between the band's last studio album—1996's Soundtracks for the Blind—as well as his subsequent work with Angels of Light; for instance, the song "My Birth" includes lyrics written in 1997 originally for Swans. The line-up of Swans that recorded this album features Gira, Kristof Hahn, Phil Puleo, and Norman Westberg from prior Swans releases as well as Gira solo collaborators Thor Harris and Christopher Pravdica; this is the first Swans album that does not feature Jarboe since her debut on 1986's Greed. Gira chose these musicians in part for how they would work together touring to promote this album and has created a distinct sound for Swans, emphasizing rhythm and the interplay between atmospheric instruments such as dulcimer, tubular bells, and vibraphone.

Gira contacted Italian artist Beatrice Pediconi to handle all of the artwork for the album after seeing her pieces in Harper's Magazine. The special edition of the album has a cover that mirrors the album artwork of I Am Not Insane.

== Themes ==
The title of the album comes from the lyrics to a then unreleased Swans song entitled "Oxygen" (which was later released on To Be Kind) that depicts Gira dying and ascending to Heaven and several reviewers have noted spiritual themes on the album. Gira's interest in spirituality developed with this album and his goal was to create music "to elevate, to make you levitate, almost like having it erase your body and lift you up to Heaven."

The song "Jim" is a tribute to Gira's longtime friend JG Thirlwell.

== Promotion ==
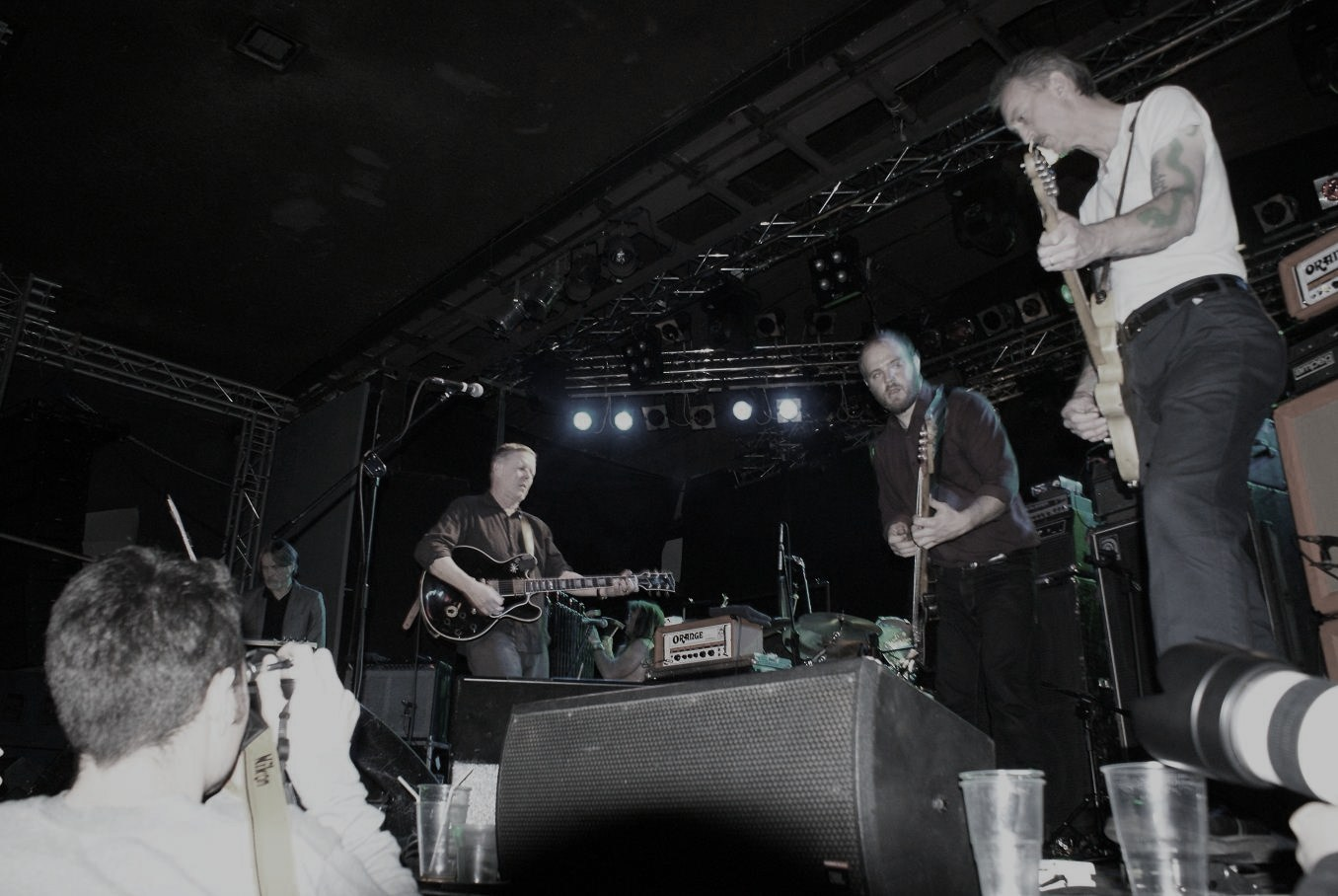
Swans touring in 2010 to promote My Father Will Guide Me up a Rope to the Sky

In addition to releasing I Am Not Insane, Gira promoted the album by offering it for free streaming on the Internet, made a demo version of the song "No Words" available on the band's MySpace page, and reorganized Swans for their first tour since 1997. Tour dates were slated to be performed in the United States and Europe, including headlining the Supersonic Festival in October 2010, and Gira intended to tour for 18 months. Gira also remixed the album with the intention of selling that version on tour and through the band's website.

== Critical reception ==
Professional ratings
Aggregate scores
Source	Rating
AnyDecentMusic?	8.0/10
Metacritic	83/100
Review scores
Source	Rating
AllMusic	4/5 stars
The A.V. Club	A
Drowned in Sound	8/10
Mojo	4/5 stars
NME	9/10
Pitchfork	7.7/10
PopMatters	9/10
Slant Magazine	4/5 stars
Spin	8/10
Uncut	4/5 stars

My Father Will Guide Me up a Rope to the Sky is rated an 83 with "universal acclaim" by Metacritic. The A.V. Club gave the album an A, calling it "a leviathan of an album" and commenting on the similarities and differences that this album has with the rest of Swans' catalogue, saying that it "resembles all of Swans' previous work, yet none of it." BBC Music has declared it "a majestic return and, let us hope, a harbinger of more to come." The Big Takeover has remarked that the album "encompasses all of the original band's many moods." The Wire listed My Father Will Guide Me up a Rope to the Sky as the third best record of 2010 in its annual critics' poll.

== Track listing ==
All songs written by Michael Gira

1. "No Words / No Thoughts" – 9:24
2. "Reeling the Liars In" – 2:20
3. "Jim" – 6:46
4. "My Birth" – 3:52
5. "You Fucking People Make Me Sick" – 5:08
6. "Inside Madeline" – 6:36
7. "Eden Prison" – 6:03
8. "Little Mouth" – 4:12

Bonus disc available on the special edition

1. "Look at Me Go" – 46:07

A collection of studio outtakes mixed into one track

== Personnel ==
Swans

- Michael Gira – electric guitar, vocals, electric 12 string guitar, sounds, acoustic guitar, production
- Kristof Hahn – electric guitar
- Thor Harris – drums, percussion, keyboards, vibes, dulcimer, curios
- Christopher Pravdica – bass guitar, Jew's harp on "You Fucking People Make Me Sick"
- Phil Puleo – drums, percussion, dulcimer
- Norman Westberg – electric guitar, e-bow on "Inside Madeline"

Additional musicians

- Devendra Banhart – vocals on "You Fucking People Make Me Sick"
- Brian Carpenter – trumpet, slide trumpet
- Steve Moses – trombone
- Saoirse Gira – vocals on "You Fucking People Make Me Sick"
- Grasshopper – mandolin
- Bill Rieflin – drums, piano, 12 string acoustic guitar, electric guitar, synthesizer, organ
- Jason La Farge – strings on "Look at Me Go"
- Haela Hunt-Hendrix – guitar on "Look at Me Go"

Technical personnel

- Beatrice Pediconi – artwork
- David Perry – layout
- Kevin S. McMahon – engineering, processing, mixing
- Jamal Rhue – mastering
- Brian Carpenter – horns
- Michael Gira – artwork
- Jason La Farge – engineering
- Kevin S. McMahon/Marcata Recording – engineering, mixing, mastering
