= Paradise Is Mine =

Single by Swans

from the album The Beggar
- Released: March 22, 2023
- Genre: Experimental rock; post-rock; neofolk
- Length: 9:26
- Label: Young God Records
- Composer: Michael Gira
- Producer: Michael Gira

Swans singles chronology
"The Hanging Man" (2019)	"Paradise Is Mine" (2023)	"Los Angeles: City of Death" (2023)

"Paradise Is Mine" is a song by American experimental rock band Swans, released through Young God Records on March 22, 2023, as the lead single for their sixteenth studio album The Beggar (2023). It was the first new music from the band since their previous album Leaving Meaning (2019) over three years prior, excluding the limited-release demo tape Is There Really A Mind? (2022) on which an early version of this song was featured.

== Background and release ==
An acoustic rendition of the then-unfinished song, recorded by band leader Michael Gira alone at his home studio, appeared as the first track on the demo album Is There Really A Mind? which had been released in February 2022 to fundraise for the recording and production of The Beggar (2023). This song and the rest of its parent album was fleshed out in recording sessions that began in Berlin on May 2, 2022, and were finalized that August. The following year, on the day before the completed track came out officially, its release was teased with a short clip posted on Swans' official Instagram account. Then, on the actual day of the song's release, a lyric video for the track was uploaded to Swans' official YouTube channel.

== Reception ==
"Paradise Is Mine" was met with primarily positive reviews. Beats Per Minute described the "spiritual and surreal" track as having a "patient, foreboding build up" that also incorporates "weird wind instrumentation", while Consequence summarized it as "a nine-minute experimental rock epic featuring droning vocals from Gira as he ponders our very existence". The track is further characterized as "naggingly hypnotic" and "hauntingly seismic" by The Guardian and Louder Than War, respectively, and is also recounted by AllMusic as "a steady crawl that gradually gains layers of swooping background vocals and slightly more dissonant guitar patterns".
