= The Body Lovers / The Body Haters =

US musical group

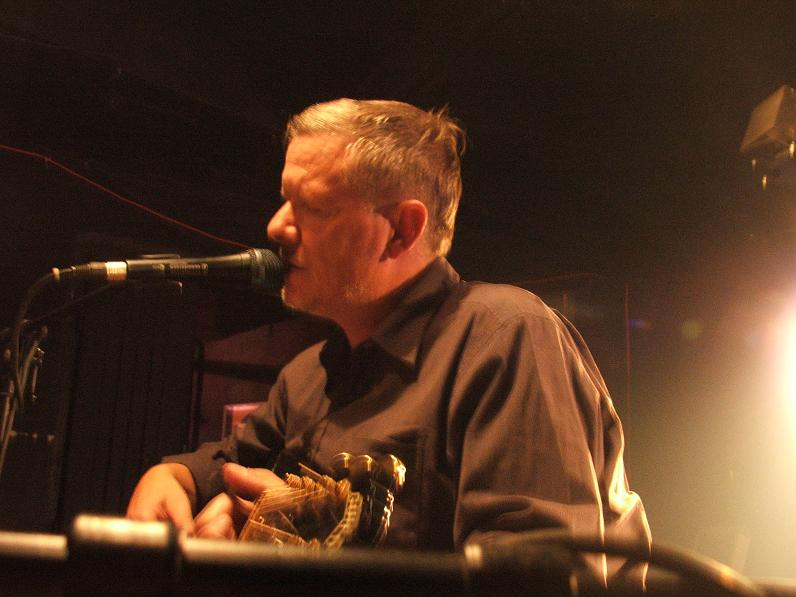
- Michael Gira during the performance of "No Mercy" at an Angels Of Light concert in Warsaw, October 8, 2005.

Background information
- Genres: Drone, dark ambient
- Years active: 1998–1999
- Label: Young God
- Past members: Michael Gira

The Body Lovers and The Body Haters were experimental music projects led by composer Michael Gira between 1998 and 1999 following the breakup of Swans in 1997. Both projects served as an outlet for Gira's loop experimentation within the drone and dark ambient genres and were compared to the compositions comprising Swans' final pre-breakup album Soundtracks for the Blind. The music was built around samples and found sounds, some of which dated as having been recorded as far back as 1980.

== History ==
The Body Lovers/The Body Haters was conceived as a studio only project after the dissolution of composer Michael Gira's band Swans in 1997. Swans had been active since 1982 and had come to serve as Gira's primary musical outlet. The project featured input from former Swans contributors, such as Jarboe, Bill Rieflin, Bill Bronson, Norman Westberg and Clinton Steele. The name Body Lovers was inspired by a composition on Jarboe's Sacrificial Cake titled "The Body Lover". A trilogy was planned and two albums were released, Number One of Three in 1998 and 34:13 the following year. The music was built on samples and found sounds, with Gira drawing inspiration from composers such as Glenn Branca and Arvo Pärt. After 1999, Gira turned his attention to his song-oriented project The Angels of Light. In 2010, Gira reformed and began touring Swans. Although only 2 albums were officially released, Many people have considered the track "The Beggar Lover (Three)" off of Swans 16th studio album The Beggar to be the third and final release in the trilogy.

== Discography ==
Studio albums

- Number One of Three (Young God, 1998)
- 34:13 (Young God, 1999)

Compilation albums

- The Body Lovers / The Body Haters (Young God, 2000)
