= The Beggar (album) =

- Digital artwork for the album; physical copies come with the heart on a plain brown background

Studio album by Swans
- Released: June 23, 2023
- Recorded: May 2 – August 25, 2022
- Studio: Candy Bomber (Berlin)
- Genre: Post-rock; drone
- Length: 121:37 (CD version); 77:46 (vinyl version)
- Language: English
- Label: Mute; Young God
- Producer: Michael Gira

Swans chronology
Is There Really a Mind? (2022)	The Beggar (2023)	Live Rope (2024)

Singles from The Beggar
- 1. "Paradise Is Mine" Released: March 22, 2023; 2. "Los Angeles: City of Death" Released: May 24, 2023

The Beggar is the sixteenth studio album by the American experimental rock band Swans. It was released by Mute and Young God Records on June 23, 2023. Written during the COVID-19 pandemic, it was recorded at Candy Bomber Studio in Berlin, Germany, across 2022, with key collaborators of front man Michael Gira, as well as both past and present members of the band. The announcement of the album coincided with the release of its lead single, "Paradise Is Mine", as well as the announcement of a world tour. The Beggar was preceded and funded by the acoustic demo album Is There Really a Mind? (2022).

== Background ==
Swans released their fifteenth studio album Leaving Meaning in 2019, which was a new direction for the band. Front man Michael Gira stated that, starting with Leaving Meaning, he "decided to make Swans a more open-ended venture, with musicians coming and going from project to project". After the album's release, Swans planned for a series of tours to support Leaving Meaning in 2019 and 2020, but the tours were cancelled due to the COVID-19 pandemic. This prompted Gira to write songs for a new Swans album. Gira needed funding for the then-upcoming sixteenth studio album from the band, which led to the release of the fundraiser demo album Is There Really a Mind?, which was released in February 2022. The demo album consisted of acoustic renditions of many of the album's then-unfinished tracks, primarily recorded by Gira alone at his home studio. Gira promised support for the fundraiser would "go a long way in ensuring a fully realized and well produced album". The album was recorded and mixed at Candy Bomber Studio in Berlin, Germany.

== Composition ==
The Beggar has been classified as post-rock and drone. Tyler Golsen of Far Out described the album's tone as "dark, mysterious, and lingering" and mentioned "Gira's signature ominous bray frequently moans and gargles its way throughout the seemingly-endless songs". Compositions on The Beggar are constructed around heavy repetition, that unlike the sheer force of older Swans records, is described by Aural Aggravation's Christopher Nosnibor as "woozy and nagging".

== Promotion and release ==
The Beggar was announced on March 22, 2023 and coincided with the release of the album's lead single, "Paradise Is Mine". That same day, they also announced a world tour with shows in North America as well as the United Kingdom. The band followed it with a second and final single, "Los Angeles: City of Death", on May 24, 2023, as well as announced new shows to their world tour.

The Beggar was released on June 23, 2023, via Mute and Young God Records.

== Critical reception ==
Professional ratings
Aggregate scores
Source	Rating
AnyDecentMusic?	7.5/10
Metacritic	80/100
Review scores
Source	Rating
AllMusic	3.5/5 stars
Beats Per Minute	90%
The Guardian	4/5 stars
Louder Than War	5/5 stars
Mojo	4/5 stars
MusicOMH	4/5 stars
The Skinny	3/5 stars
Slant Magazine	3.5/5 stars
Sputnikmusic	3.7/5
Uncut	8/10

The Beggar received positive reviews from music critics. At Metacritic, which assigns a normalized rating out of 100 to reviews from professional publications, it received an average score of 80, based on 10 reviews, indicating "generally favorable reviews". The aggregator AnyDecentMusic? gave it a 7.5 out of 10, based on their assessment of the critical consensus.

Writing for Louder Than War, John Robb awarded the album five out of five stars, and praised the band for being "full of surprise and enigma", and believes "they paint pictures and atmospheres that other bands can only dream of". Reviewing the album for Beats Per Minute, John Wohlmacher applauded the album for "mark[ing] Gira’s most self-reflective lyricism" and feels the album contains "his most approachable and nuanced compositions". In a review for The Guardian, critic Dave Simpson wrote that the album's "prevailing atmosphere" is "one of unsettling, claustrophobic unease, as [Gira] contemplates life and mortality" and compared tracks "Los Angeles: City of Death", "Michael Is Done" and "Unforming" to the work of the Velvet Underground, Brian Eno and Spiritualized, respectively. Wyndham Wallace of Uncut declared the album is "definitely not for the fainthearted" in a positive review. For MusicOMH, David Murphy proposed the album has "two [flavors], gliding between sweet and sour, heavenly and harrowing, or […] paradise and parasite" and wrote that "whilst listening is intentionally oppressive, it’s like the insidious continual whisper of conscience rather than the brimstone sermon, and even when songs reach a clangorous attack they tend to build frog-boilingly slowly from hushed beginnings". The Arts Desk's Guy Oddy stated that "there is plenty that is new and interesting on The Beggar" while also noting "at two hours' long, some may still find it a bit much to consume in one sitting" in an overall positive review.

Other reviewers were less enthusiastic, yet still positive. Reviewing the album for AllMusic, Paul Simpson compared it to the band's previous release, stating that "for the most part, The Beggar builds on the sound of Leaving Meaning, though Gira is clearly interested in pushing the band into weirder territory again," and called it, "a riskier yet more successful effort that feels like a step in a more fulfilling direction." Paul Attard of Slant Magazine found The Beggar was stopped from "reaching true greatness" because of "how it stands in the shadow of Swans’s recent albums" and criticized the album's "grandiosity" for becoming "slightly predictable". The Skinny's Joe Creely called The Beggar "another solid entry into the Swans canon, if not one that suggests it will have the staying power of their classics", and complimented the album for "mark[ing] Swans as a group intent on developing long into their career" as well as recognizing "there’s no threat of them losing their intensity" in a lukewarm review. In a review for Far Out, Golsen criticized the album's "interminable song lengths" and "complete absence of accessible melodies" for not appealing to casual listeners, but simultaneously praised Gira for "forsaking compromise and only playing to the most dedicated of listeners".

=== Year-end lists ===
Publication	List	Rank	Ref.
Rough Trade	Top 100 Albums of the Year 2023	42	
Fopp	Best Albums of 2023	—N/a	

== Track listing ==
Disc one
No.	Title	Length
1.	"The Parasite"	8:21
2.	"Paradise Is Mine"	9:23
3.	"Los Angeles: City of Death"	3:29
4.	"Michael Is Done"	6:08
5.	"Unforming"	5:55
6.	"The Beggar"	10:15
7.	"No More of This"	6:55
8.	"Ebbing"	11:04
9.	"Why Can't I Have What I Want Any Time That I Want?"	7:38
Total length:		69:08

Disc two
No.	Title	Length
1.	"The Beggar Lover (Three)"	43:51
2.	"The Memorious"	8:38
Total length:		52:29

=== Vinyl edition ===
All tracks are written by Michael Gira.

Side A
No.	Title	Length
1.	"Paradise Is Mine"	9:23
2.	"The Beggar"	10:15
Total length:		19:38

Side B
No.	Title	Length
1.	"Los Angeles: City of Death"	3:29
2.	"The Parasite"	8:27
3.	"The Memorious"	7:53
Total length:		19:49

Side C
No.	Title	Length
1.	"Michael Is Done"	6:08
2.	"Why Can't I Have What I Want Any Time That I Want?"	7:41
3.	"Unforming"	6:10
Total length:		19:59

Side D
No.	Title	Length
1.	"Ebbing"	11:25
2.	"No More of This"	6:55
Total length:		18:20

Notes

- "The Beggar Lover (Three)" is excluded from the vinyl release, save for in the form of a digital download card.

== Personnel ==
Credits adapted from The Beggar digital liner notes and press release.

Swans

- Michael Gira – vocals, words, acoustic guitar, production
- Kristof Hahn – lap steel guitar, various guitars, vocals
- Larry Mullins – drums, orchestral percussion, Mellotron, vibes, keyboards, backing vocals
- Dana Schechter – bass guitar, lap steel, keyboards, vocals, piano
- Christopher Pravdica – bass guitar, sounds, keyboards, vocals
- Phil Puleo – drums, percussion, vocals, piano, exotic wind instruments

Other musicians

- Ben Frost – guitar, synthesizers, sound manipulations
- Jennifer Gira – backing vocals
- Lucy Kruger – backing vocals
- Laura Carbone – backing vocals
- Norman Westberg – guitar on "Ebbing"

Additional personnel

- Ingo Krauss – engineering
- Doug Henderson – mastering
- Nicole Boitos – artwork

== Charts ==
Chart performance for The Beggar
Chart (2023)	Peak position
Belgian Albums (Ultratop Flanders)	98
German Albums (Offizielle Top 100)	37
Polish Albums (ZPAV)	94
Scottish Albums (OCC)	18
UK Album Downloads (OCC)	60
UK Independent Albums (OCC)	8

== Release history ==
Release dates and format(s) for The Beggar
Region	Date	Format(s)	Label	Ref.
Various	June 23, 2023	Streaming; digital download; 2×LP; 2×CD	Young God; Mute	
