= 34:13 =

Studio album by The Body Haters
- Released: 1999
- Recorded: Hellhole Studios
- Genre: Drone
- Length: 34:13
- Label: Young God
- Producer: Michael Gira

The Body Lovers / The Body Haters chronology
Number One of Three (1998)	34:13 (1999)	The Body Lovers / The Body Haters (2005)

Professional ratings
Review scores
Source	Rating
Allmusic	4.5/5 stars

34:13 is the second and final studio album by the electronic band The Body Lovers / The Body Haters. It was released in 1999 on Young God Records. The album was released under the name "The Body Haters".

== Track listing ==
All music is composed by Michael Gira

No.	Title	Length
1.	"34:13"	34:13

== Personnel ==
Adapted from the 34:13 liner notes.

Musicians

- Kris Force – effects
- Michael Gira – musical arrangement, production
- Jarboe – effects
- James Plotkin – effects

Production and additional personnel

- Chris Griffin – editing, mastering

== Release history ==
Region	Date	Label	Format	Catalog
United States	1999	Young God	CD	YG07
