= Swans (EP) =

EP (12") by Swans
- Released: 1982
- Recorded: August 1981 – March 1982
- Genre: No wave; post-punk; dance-punk
- Length: 19:23
- Label: Labor
- Producer: Michael Gira

Swans chronology
Swans (1982)	Filth (1983)

Professional ratings
Review scores
Source	Rating
AllMusic	2.5/5 stars
Spin Alternative Record Guide	2/10

Swans is the first EP by the experimental rock band Swans. Their first project, it was released in 1982 on Labor.

== Background ==
The EP was re-EQ'd by M. Gira and S. McAllister, remastered, and appended to the 1990 reissue of the follow-up album Filth LP on Gira's own Young God label. On the reissue CD the tracks are in a different order; the tracks on each side of the EP are reversed. The 1990 Filth CD on which the EP was reissued is long out of print. Although Filth was reissued again by Young God in 1999 and 2014, Swans did not appear on any subsequent Young God Records reissue until Spring 2015, as a Record Store Day Exclusive Release.

The 2015 12" reissue and versions appearing on the Filth Deluxe Edition 3-CD set are the original 1982 mixes faithfully restored.

== Track listing ==
All lyrics are written by Michael Gira; all music is composed by Michael Gira.

Side A
No.	Title	Length
1.	"Laugh"	4:06
2.	"Speak"	4:31

Side B
No.	Title	Length
1.	"Take Advantage"	4:29
2.	"Sensitive Skin"	6:16
Total length:		19:23

== Personnel ==
- Michael Gira – bass/vocals
- Jonathan Kane – drums
- Bob Pezzola – guitar
- Daniel Galli-Duani – saxophone
