= Is There Really a Mind? =

Demo album by Swans
- Released: February 2022
- Studio: Gira's home studio
- Length: 70:20
- Label: Young God
- Producer: Michael Gira

Swans chronology
Leaving Meaning (2019)	Is There Really a Mind? (2022)	The Beggar (2023)

Is There Really a Mind? is a 2022 limited-edition fundraiser album by American experimental rock band Swans. The album was released in February 2022 on band leader Michael Gira's Young God Records. Limited to 2,500 copies, Is There Really a Mind? serves as a fundraiser for the sixteenth Swans album The Beggar, which began recording in May 2022 and was released on June 23, 2023. The latter announcement was coupled with the completed version of "Paradise Is Mine" being released as the new album's lead single.

== Background ==
After the tour for Swans' 2019 album Leaving Meaning was canceled due to the COVID-19 pandemic, Gira decided to refocus on creating a new album, which resulted in the ten songs found on Is There Really a Mind? In the liner notes of this release, Gira describes these recordings as "rough, preliminary versions (of most) of the songs that will appear on the upcoming Swans album. These recordings are intended for your ears only as a gesture of appreciation for your support of the music, and as a way to raise funds to make the recording and production of the album as nuanced and fully realized as possible."

== Track listing ==
All tracks are written by Michael Gira.

No.	Title	Length
1.	"Paradise Is Mine"	8:04
2.	"The Beggar"	6:58
3.	"The Parasite"	9:53
4.	"Los Angeles: City of Death"	3:52
5.	"Ebbing"	5:59
6.	"Why Can't I Have What I Want Any Time That I Want"	6:56
7.	"The Memorious"	8:23
8.	"Michael Is Done"	5:40
9.	"Unforming"	6:40
10.	"No More of This"	7:54
Total length:		70:20

Notes

- "No More of This" is not listed on the liner notes
- When originally announced, the demo sessions included tracks titled "My Phantom Limb (Revised)" and "You Will Pay", the latter of which was also planned for Swans' previous 2019 fundraiser album, What Is This?

== Personnel ==
Credits adapted from Is There Really a Mind? liner notes

- Michael Gira – words, music, recording, liner notes, design concept
- Little Mikey – additional vocals and percussion (track 7)
- Ingo Krauss – mastering
- Nicole Boitos – artwork
