= STNNNG =

American noise-rock band from Minneapolis

- Also known as: The Stunning
- Origin: Minneapolis, Minnesota, United States
- Genres: Post-punk, noise rock
- Years active: 2003–2017
- Label: Modern Radio
- Members: Chris Besinger; Adam Burt; Jesse Kwakenat; Nathan Nelson; Ben Ivascu; J. Michael Ward

STNNNG (pronounced 'Stunning') was an American noise rock band from Minneapolis, Minnesota. Formed in 2003, they played over 400 live shows in the United States, England, France, and Belgium. STNNNG released four full-length albums on the Twin Cities-based Modern Radio record label before splitting up in 2017.

== History ==
For their first two years as a band, STNNNG performed as the quartet of Chris Besinger (vocals), Adam Burt (guitar), Nathan Nelson (guitar), and J. Michael Ward (drums). Their first releases, 2004's split 7-inch with Chicago's The Means and 2005's debut album, Dignified Sissy, were recorded with this lineup. The cover of Dignified Sissy features Bear Attack, a painting by historical artist Mort Kunstler.

STNNNG took first place in the annual "Picked To Click" band poll in Minneapolis' City Pages in 2005.

STNNNG's second album, Fake Fake, was the first to feature Jesse Kwakenat (also of Heroine Sheiks) on bass. Fake Fake was recorded and engineered by Mike Lust at Lust Manor in Chicago.

STNNNG's 3rd full-length album, The Smoke of My Will, was released in October 2010. The album was the band's first after the departure of original drummer J. Michael Ward in August 2009. He was replaced by Ben Ivascu (also known for playing drums in Poliça, Marijuana Death Squads, and Signal to Trust) as a permanent member.

In February 2013, STNNNG released Empire Inward, an eight-song album recorded at Electrical Audio studio in Chicago, Illinois, and engineered and mixed by Steve Albini. It was named one of the best Minnesota records of the year by Star Tribune critic Chris Riemenschneider, who praised the band's "raw power" and said that "traces of MC5, Fugazi and At the Drive-In permeate such scorched-earth tracks as "Texas Disco" and "Long Middle."

In 2017 they released Veterans of Pleasure, the band's final album, on which they again worked with Albini.

STNNNG announced their immediate disbanding after a show in September 2017.

The band's final release was a split EP with Child Bite, released in November 2017.

== Discography ==
=== Albums ===
- Dignified Sissy CD/LP (2005), Modern Radio
- Fake Fake CD/LP (2006), Modern Radio
- The Smoke of My Will LP (2010), Modern Radio
- Empire Inward CD/LP (2013), Rejuvenation/Modern Radio
- Veterans of Pleasure LP (2017), Modern Radio

=== Singles & Compilations ===
- Means/STNNNG Split 7-inch (2004), Nodak
- Ladies & Gentlemen No. 2 (2006), Ladies & Gentlemen Magazine - compilation LP
- Stuck on AM Vol. 5 (2006), Radio K - compilation CD
- STNNNG/Signal to Trust Split 7-inch (2007), Modern Radio
- Radio K (2007), Radio K - compilation CD
- Stuck on AM Vol. 6 (2008), Radio K - compilation CD
- Stuck on AM 7: Stuck On Tape (2011), Radio K - compilation cassette
- 89.3 The Current - Local Current Volume 1 (2011), The Current - compilation CD
- Doom Town U$A (2011), Doom Town - compilation cassette
- STNNNG/Child Bite split EP (2017), Forge Again
