= 13 (Norman Westberg album) =

Studio album by Norman Westberg
- Released: November 13, 2015
- Recorded: 2013
- Length: 31:04
- Label: Room40
- Producer: Norman Westberg

Norman Westberg chronology
Jasper Sits Out (2014)	13 (2015)

13 is a solo album by American musician and Swans guitarist Norman Westberg. Originally released as a handmade limited edition disc, the album officially released on November 13, 2015 through Lawrence English's Room40 record label.

== Background ==
Recorded in 2013, the album was released as a handmade limited edition of only 75 copies. The album was subsequently remastered and edited for a CD and digital release. The opening track, "Frostbite Falls," was released for streaming on September 18, 2015.

Room40 founder Lawrence English stated on the album:

"His guitar, as singular source, becomes transformed through a web of outboard processes. He transforms vibrating strings completely, taking singular gesture and reshapes it through webs of delay, reverb and other treatments. To me, these works echo many of the concerns of American minimalism and sprawl towards the work of bands such as Stars of the Lid. Norman has created a very dense and powerful statement of intent with these recordings and I couldn't be more pleased to have some small part in helping to share them."

== Track listing ==
All tracks written by Norman Westberg.

1. "Frostbite Falls" — 11:08
2. "Bunny Bill" — 10:35
3. "Oops, Wrong Hat" — 9:21

== Personnel ==
Album personnel as adapted from Discogs.

- Norman Westberg — bowed bass (1), electric guitar (2), acoustic guitar (3), recording
