= The Heroine Sheiks =

American noise rock band

- Origin: New York City, United States
- Genres: Noise rock
- Years active: 1999–2008
- Labels: Amphetamine Reptile; Reptilian Records; Rubric
- Past members: Rea Mochiach; J Bryan Bowden; Creighton Chamberlain; Eric Eble; John Fell; Scott Hill; Sarah Huska; Rob Kimball; Jesse Kwakenat; George Porfiris; Eric Robel; Martin Ros; Paul Sanders; Shannon Selberg; Norman Westberg; Bruce Wuollet
- Website: www.heroinesheiks.com

The Heroine Sheiks was an American noise rock band based in New York. It began in 1999, as a collaboration between Shannon Selberg, George Porfiris, Norman Westberg and John Fell. Selberg predominantly has been the band's songwriter, whose sound was darker and more sinister than his previous work in The Cows.

With several references to the writer Louis-Ferdinand Céline, the band explored a thematic quality of black comedy. Their name is a play on the heroin chic, fashion trend of the 1990s.

== History ==
The initial lineup of Selberg, Porfiris, and J Bryan Bowden, eventually joined by Norman Westberg on Porfiris' advice. Westberg, in turn, brought John Fell into the band.

They recorded the first single on Amphetamine Reptile records titled "Heroine Sheiks". The release included the songs "We are the", "Let's Fight" and "Swedish Fly". The band received good support from the local NYC underground rock scene and prompted a full length release by Reptilian Records. Rape on the Installment Plan is considered an art/noise rock masterpiece by critics and fans alike. The record was released on white vinyl and CD.

The buzz surrounding Heroine Sheiks at that point was huge due to the combination of Selberg, Westberg, Fell, and Porfiris who had done time in bands like Swans, The Cows, China Shop, Kelly Township, Foetus, Richard Hell, Miami Sound Machine, Ultra Bide; among others. During live shows of this period Scott Hill was added to the lineup to perform keyboard duties, he was known for his periodic dancing between keyboard parts and provided some comedy relief as Selberg's performance was menacing, confrontational and often purposely bizarre.

In 2001, the bass guitar player George Porfiris left the band and Eric Eble joined. The band signed to Rubric Records and recorded the single "Best Enemies/Oucha" and eventually the album Siamese Pipe. The record was a solid sophomoric release, but received mixed reviews. Fan favorite songs "Army Brat", "My Boss" and "Mas Suicide" are included. The production on Siamese was cleaner and had more of a standard mix next to Rape, but the successful formula of Selberg's toy keyboard and Westberg's signature guitar playing is very pronounced. Overall the rhythm section became heavier and tighter with greater complexity in the writing and arrangements. The band periodically toured throughout this period and created a solid fan base across the US. For live shows, keyboards were played by both Scott Hill and the newcomer Creighton Chamberlain.

In the spring of 2003, founding member Norman Westberg left the band and Selberg recruited Martin Ros from the then breaking up band Sons of Mata Hari. Ros's sound fitted in perfectly with the ever evolving sound of the Sheiks, as he was an accomplished guitarist with a rich punk rock and noise rock history. Summer and fall shows followed with positive response. In late 2003, the drummer John Fell left due to chronic hearing problems and in early 2004 the bass guitarist, Eric Eble, also left the band. Selberg was now left to find a complete rhythm section. Turning towards Ros to help, he suggested bass guitar player Rob Kimball and drummer Eric Robel who were also from the band Sons of Mata hari. With the entirely new lineup, the band charged new energy and outlook for Selberg as he produced some of his best writing to date. A midwest tour in the Spring followed with positive reception and material was written in the Summer of 2004 for an upcoming demo. It was at this time that Gibby Haynes of the Butthole Surfers was attending the Sheiks shows, impressed with Selberg he invited them on his upcoming tour with "Gibby Haynes and His Problem", a newly conceived band that had just released an album of the same name. Heroine Sheiks accepted and a 30-day tour ensued prompting the completion of the new band's 2005 demo.

Out of Aferica was released on Reptilian Records in Summer 2005 and produced the greatest reviews since the band's debut. The record was recorded in two days and mixed in one week. Out of Aferica exhibited Selberg's various personalities as a writer and creative force, and the new band's sound was more rock oriented than the band's previous lineup. A US tour followed in the fall with minimal exposure to the new record and the band saw it difficult to continue. The New York chapter of the Heroine Sheiks officially ended in March 2006. Within a year Selberg had moved back to his hometown of Minneapolis.

After returning to Minneapolis, Selberg gathered new musicians to continue as the Heroine Sheiks. They released a limited edition CD Journey to the End of the Knife, and toured nationally with the new line-up. The line-up included the bass guitar player Jesse Kwakenat (also of STNNNG), drummer Bruce "BJ" Wuollet (also of Disasteratti), Paul Sanders formerly of Hammerhead, and Sarah Huska (also of Ouija Radio).

== Discography ==
=== Studio releases ===
- Rape on the Installment Plan - (2000, Reptilian)
- Siamese Pipe - (2002, Rubric)
- Out of Aferica - (2005, Reptilian)
- Journey to the End of the Knife - (2008, Amphetamine Reptile)

=== Singles ===
- "Heroine Sheiks" - (1999, Reptilian)
- "Best Enemies/Oucha" - (2002, Rubric)

=== DVD release ===
- Live at The Ottobar - (2005, Robellion DVD)
