= Greed (Swans album) =

1986 album by Swans

Studio album by Swans
- Released: February 28, 1986
- Recorded: June–August 1985
- Studios: Intergalactic, New York City, United States
- Genre: Industrial
- Length: 37:34
- Labels: PVC (US); K.422 (International)
- Producers: Michael Gira; Estabon

Swans chronology
Young God (1984)	Greed (1986)	Holy Money (1986)

Greed is the third studio album by American experimental rock band Swans. It was released in 1986, through record label K.422. Greed marks the slow turning point for Swans away from the harsh, brutal noise rock of prior releases, and is also the first Swans album to contain contributions from Jarboe.

== Background ==
Certain tracks utilize drum machines instead of conventional drumming. The lead instrument on "Fool" is a grand piano. "Money Is Flesh" uses a synthesizer.

The first CD issue contained the "Time Is Money (Bastard)" single as bonus tracks. A later compilation released in 1992, Greed / Holy Money, combined Greed (barring "Fool" and "Money Is Flesh", however "Fool (#2)" and "Money Is Flesh (#2)" were listed as these, respectively) and Holy Money (barring "A Screw (Holy Money)", though "A Screw (Holy Money) (Mix)" was listed as this), as well as the entirety of the A Screw EP and an abridged version of "Time Is Money (Bastard) (Mix)" (listed as "Time Is Money (Bastard)") from the "Time Is Money (Bastard)" single. This compilation, with its entirely re-organized track list, saw re-issue in 1999 in the double-disc set Cop/Young God / Greed/Holy Money, which included the Cop album and Young God EP.

== Critical reception ==
Professional ratings
Review scores
Source	Rating
AllMusic	4/5 stars
The Encyclopedia of Popular Music	4/5 stars
Ondarock	6.5/10
The Rolling Stone Album Guide	1/5 stars
Spin Alternative Record Guide	7/10

The New York Times wrote that "some [songs] are dominated by the hammer-on-anvil chording of the guitarist Norman Westberg, while others feature a welter of chanting voices and sound like some sinister religious ritual." Trouser Press called Greed the album "where everything finally jells," writing that "each track is a complete work in itself, enthralling and narcotizing." The Quietus deemed it "intense bleakness with power plant rhythms, tougher than concrete wrapped in leather."

== Track listing ==
All lyrics are written by Michael Gira; all music is composed by Swans.

Side A
No.	Title	Length
1.	"Fool"	5:23
2.	"Anything for You"	4:32
3.	"Nobody"	4:49
4.	"Stupid Child"	5:19

Side B
No.	Title	Length
1.	"Greed"	6:17
2.	"Heaven"	4:54
3.	"Money Is Flesh"	6:20

CD bonus tracks: "Time Is Money (Bastard)" (single)
No.	Title	Length
8.	"Time Is Money (Bastard)"	5:40
9.	"Sealed in Skin"	6:09
10.	"Time Is Money (Bastard) (Mix)"	7:05

== Personnel ==
- Michael Gira – vocals, samples, tape operation, bass guitar, production, album cover design
- Jarboe – backing vocals, piano, tape operation
- Norman Westberg – guitar
- Harry Crosby – bass guitar
- Ronaldo Gonzalez – drums; piano on “Fool”
- Ted Parsons – drums
- Ivan Nahem – drums

Technical

- Estabon – production assistance
- Jorgé Estabon – engineering
- P. White – album cover artwork

== Charts ==
Chart (1986)	Peak position
UK Indie Chart	6
