= The Burning World (album) =

Studio album by Swans
- Released: May 15, 1989
- Studio: Platinum Island (New York, New York); B.C. (Brooklyn, New York)
- Genre: Folk; Americana; psychedelic rock; gothic country
- Length: 44:13
- Label: Uni
- Producer: Bill Laswell; Michael Gira

Swans chronology
Feel Good Now (1988)	The Burning World (1989)	Anonymous Bodies in an Empty Room (1990)

Singles from Swans
- 1. "Saved" Released: 1989; 2. "Can't Find My Way Home" Released: 1989

The Burning World is the sixth studio album by American experimental rock band Swans. It was released on May 15, 1989, through record label Uni Records, the band's only major-label release. Co-produced by Bill Laswell and band leader Michael Gira, the album features a major stylistic shift from their past releases, being very tuneful and accessible compared to the bleak, industrialized sound from their records. It received a mixed reception and was a commercial disappointment; the band was dropped from the record label following its poor performance.

== Background and music ==
Following the unexpected popularity of the band's cover of Joy Division's "Love Will Tear Us Apart," the band signed to Uni Records, owned by MCA Inc. (now Universal Music). Due to Uni's insistence, Swans leader Michael Gira co-produced the album with bass guitarist Bill Laswell. During the recording sessions Swans consisted of Gira on vocals and guitar, keyboardist/singer Jarboe and guitarist Norman Westberg. They were accompanied by Laswell on bass guitar, as well as a series of Laswell's regular collaborators as session musicians on "multicultural instruments". According to Gira, the album was recorded "piecemeal, with no communication between musicians."

The album's style has been described as "acoustic-folk", "'world music' rock with electric shadings", "psychedelic rock equally lush and dark" and "dark Americana". Laswell's production work also weights on the album's sound, with "a much more somber, elegiac approach to music-making." The album also features the first vocal duets between Gira and Jarboe. According to Thom Jurek of AllMusic, guitarist Norman Westberg "played as much acoustic guitar as electric guitar on the record" and Jarboe's keyboards mostly "floated through the mix."

Despite appreciating Laswell's production work in general, Gira was critical of The Burning World. In 2011, he stated: "I abhor that record. Bill Laswell is a very good producer, but we didn't mesh well. I was intimidated and sang in this cramped, monotone way. It didn't sell, and we got dropped." The album was reissued on CD by Water Records in 2012. Despite Gira's reservations about the record, the track "God Damn The Sun" has remained a favourite in his solo performances. Gira also rehired guitarist Nicky Skopelitis and brought along drummer Anton Fier, both Laswell stalwarts, for the Swans albums White Light From the Mouth of Infinity (1991) and The Great Annihilator (1995).

== Critical reception ==
Professional ratings
Review scores
Source	Rating
AllMusic	2.5/5 stars
Ondarock	7.0/10
Spin Alternative Record Guide	6/10

The album received mixed to positive reviews from music critics, who often criticized Bill Laswell's production. AllMusic wrote, "Ultimately, Burning sounds more like a compromised major label Laswell project than a Swans album, to its overall detriment", calling the album a "general disappointment". On the other hand, Trouser Press was favorable, writing: "The Burning World benefits a great deal from the world music instrumentation and structural abilities Laswell brings to it. The arrangements are uniformly strong, the gentler sounds don't strike one as a compromise and the cover of Blind Faith's "Can't Find My Way Home" is both apt and surprising", ultimately calling the album "a nice one that's almost as haunting as it wants to be." Rosemary Passatino of Spin praised the album, commenting: "Shockingly, Burning World is unbashedly pretty as it is dark." She also described the album as "elegant" and "surprisingly tender."

== Commercial performance ==
While the album reportedly sold only 5,000 copies in the United Kingdom, the single "Saved" enjoyed relative success, peaking at number 20 on the U.S. College Radio charts and number 28 on the U.S. Modern Rock Tracks chart, respectively. Following the commercial disappointment of the album, the band was dropped from Uni Records.

== Track listing ==
All tracks are written by Michael Gira, except "Can't Find My Way Home", written by Steve Winwood.

Side one
No.	Title	Length
1.	"The River that Runs with Love Won't Run Dry"	4:16
2.	"Let It Come Down"	4:28
3.	"Can't Find My Way Home" (Blind Faith cover)	4:48
4.	"Mona Lisa, Mother Earth"	4:16
5.	"(She's A) Universal Emptiness"	4:02
Total length:		21:50

Side two
No.	Title	Length
1.	"Saved"	4:11
2.	"I Remember Who You Are"	4:24
3.	"Jane Mary, Cry One Tear"	3:51
4.	"See No More"	5:30
5.	"God Damn the Sun"	4:23
Total length:		22:19

== Personnel ==
- Michael Gira – vocals, guitar, production, album cover concept and design
- Jarboe – vocals, keyboards
- Norman Westberg – guitar
- Jason Asnes – bass guitar
- Virgil Moorefield – drums
- Nicky Skopelitis – bağlama, bouzouki
- L. Shankar – double violin
- Fred Frith – violin
- Jeff Bova – keyboards
- Aïyb Dieng – percussion
- Trilok Gurtu – tabla
- Bernard Fowler – background vocals
- Fred Fowler – background vocals
- Karl Berger – vibraphone, string arrangement, conducting
- Mark Feldman – violin
- Larry Packer – violin
- John Kass – viola
- Richard Carr – viola
- Garo Yellin – cello
- Bill Laswell – production, bass guitar
- Bruce Calder – recording
- Martin Bisi – recording
- Robert Musso – recording
- Jason Corsaro – mixing
- Oz Fritz – engineering assistance
- Howie Weinberg – mastering
- DZN, The Design Group – sleeve artwork
- Vartan – sleeve art direction
- Wim V. D. Hulst – back cover photography
- Robert Mapplethorpe – front cover photography (Calla Lilly)
