= Time Is Money (Bastard) =

EP by Swans

Single by Swans
- Released: January 31, 1986
- Recorded: June–August 1985 at Intergalactic, New York City, United States
- Genre: Industrial
- Length: 18:40
- Label: K.422
- Songwriter: Michael Gira
- Producers: Michael Gira, Jorgé Estabon

Swans singles chronology
"Time Is Money (Bastard)" (1986)	"A Screw" (1986)

Audio sample
- "Time Is Money (Bastard)": file; help

"Time Is Money (Bastard)" is a song by American experimental rock band Swans. It was released as a 12-inch single in 1986, through record label K.422. The single is notable for the first official appearance of vocalist Jarboe.

== Critical reception ==
Professional ratings
Review scores
Source	Rating
AllMusic	4.5/5 stars

Trouser Press described "Time Is Money (Bastard)" as a "great single", and Ned Raggett of AllMusic called the song "an underground industrial/dance hit" and noted its aggressively explicit lyrics. John Leland at Spin said, "Swans make brutal, headbanging noise with no concessions to listenability and wail monochromatic homilies for a living descent into hell. They have no fun. Their music can be cathartic—like a sledgehammer to your solar plexus—or it can sound like someone's been hitting the French lit a little too hard."

== Track listing ==
All lyrics are written by Michael Gira; all music is composed by Swans.

No.	Title	Length
1.	"Time Is Money (Bastard)"	5:36
2.	"Sealed in Skin"	6:00
3.	"Time Is Money (Bastard)" (Mix)	7:04
Total length:		18:40

== Personnel ==
- Michael Gira – vocals, production
- N. Westerg (Norman Westberg) – guitar
- Ronaldo Gonzalez – drums
- H. Crosby (Harry Crosby) – bass guitar
- Jarboe – scream
- Jorgé Estabon – engineering, production assistance
- P. White – sleeve artwork
- M.G. – album cover design

== Charts ==
Chart (1986)	Peak position
UK Indie Chart	8
