= Cop (album) =

Studio album by Swans
- Released: 1984
- Recorded: Feb–May 1984
- Studio: Vanguard in New York City and Platinum in Zürich, Switzerland
- Genre: Industrial; noise rock
- Length: 40:48
- Label: K.422
- Producer: Michael Gira; Roli Mosimann

Swans chronology
Filth (1983)	Cop (1984)	Young God (1984)

Cop is the second studio album by American experimental rock band Swans. It was released in 1984 through record label K.422.

== Background and composition ==
On Cop, Swans took the style of their previous LP, 1983's Filth, and intensified it, utilizing slower tempos, more tape loops, and even more abrasive musical textures. The lyrics are again concerned with ambiguous themes like physical, often sexual domination and occasionally submission. Some publications recognize Cop as Swans' darkest, most brutal release.

== Release ==
In 1984, Cop was released through K.422 as Swans' second album. Initially, the album was only available as an LP. Throughout the band's history, however, Cop has been reissued within a number of different compilations. It was remastered in 1992 by band leader Michael Gira for release on CD, along with the Young God EP (1984) appended as bonus tracks. The 1999 double disc reissue Cop / Young God · Greed / Holy Money combines Cop and Young God with the compilation Greed / Holy Money (itself compiled from the albums Greed (1986) and Holy Money (1986)). The packaging for all issues states that the recording is "designed to be played at maximum volume".

== Critical reception ==
Professional ratings
Review scores
Source	Rating
AllMusic	4/5 stars
Ondarock	6.5/10
Spin Alternative Record Guide	6/10

AllMusic critic Ned Raggett wrote of the album, "Ugly, compelling and overpowering, Cop remains the pinnacle of Swans' brutal early days", calling it "quite possibly one of the darkest recordings ever done." Later writing for The Quietus, Raggett continued praising Cop, recognizing it as the source of other bands like Godflesh and The Young Gods. Aaron Lariviere of Stereogum added Neurosis to the list of bands that Cop helped influence. Miranda Yardley of Terrorizer wrote, "Michael Gira and co. make music that generates its own gravity well, never more so than here." Jonathan Gold of the Los Angeles Times listed Cop as one of the ten most essential industrial albums.

=== Accolades ===
Year	Publication	Country	Accolade	Rank
2011	Terrorizer	United Kingdom	"The Heaviest Albums Ever"	4
"*" denotes an unordered list.

== Track listing ==
All lyrics are written by Michael Gira; all music is composed by Swans.

Side A
No.	Title	Length
1.	"Half Life"	4:18
2.	"Job"	4:46
3.	"Why Hide"	5:50
4.	"Clay Man"	5:05

Side B
No.	Title	Length
1.	"Your Property"	4:48
2.	"Cop"	6:47
3.	"Butcher"	4:02
4.	"Thug"	5:12
Total length:		40:48

CD bonus tracks: Young God
No.	Title	Length
9.	"I Crawled"	5:40
10.	"Raping a Slave"	6:22
11.	"Young God"	7:03
12.	"This Is Mine"	5:24
Total length:		65:17

== Personnel ==
Swans

- Michael Gira – vocals, tapes, production
- Harry Crosby – bass guitar
- Norman Westberg – guitar
- Roli Mosimann – drums, production

Additional personnel

- Lee Ranaldo – sleeve back cover photography
- Jonathan Thayer – engineering
- JG Thirlwell – engineering
- Mark Berry – engineering
- Harry Lombardy – engineering
- Voco – engineering

== Charts ==
Chart (1984)	Peak position
UK Indie Chart	12
