= Saved (Swans song) =

Single by Swans

from the album The Burning World
- Released: 1989
- Length: 6:57
- Label: Product Inc.
- Songwriter(s): Michael Gira
- Producer(s): Michael Gira, Bill Laswell

Swans singles chronology
"Can't Find My Way Home" (1989)	"Saved" (1989)	"Celebrity Lifestyle" (1994)

Audio sample
- "Saved": file; help

Professional ratings
Review scores
Source	Rating
Allmusic	3/5 stars

Saved is a song by American experimental rock band Swans. The track was released as a single for The Burning World (1989) and reached No. 28 on Billboard's Alternative chart.

== Track listing ==
All lyrics are written by Michael Gira; all music is composed by Swans

No.	Title	Length
1.	"Saved"	4:00
2.	"See No More" (Acoustic Demo)	3:49
3.	"No Cruel Angel"	4:26
Total length:		12:15

== Personnel ==
- Michael Gira – vocals, guitar
- Jarboe – backing vocals, keyboards
- Norman Westberg – guitar
- Bill Laswell – bass
- Virgil Moorefield – drums

== Chart positions ==
Chart (1989)	Peak position
UK Singles (OCC)	96
US Alternative Airplay (Billboard)	28
