= Siamese Pipe =

Studio album by The Heroine Sheiks
- Released: October 1, 2002
- Studio: Headgear Studios, New York City
- Genre: Noise rock
- Length: 39:14
- Label: Rubric
- Producer: Greg Gordon; The Heroine Sheiks

The Heroine Sheiks chronology
Rape on the Installment Plan (2000)	Siamese Pipe (2002)	Out of Aferica (2005)

Professional ratings
Review scores
Source	Rating
AllMusic	3/5 stars
Pitchfork Media	(6.7/10)

Siamese Pipe is the second album by The Heroine Sheiks. It was released on October 1, 2002, by Rubric Records.

== Critical reception ==
CMJ New Music Monthly called the album a "marshy fun-house of noise rock," writing that "the production is almost flawless."

== Track listing ==
All tracks are written by Shannon Selberg and The Heroine Sheiks, except "My Boss" by Tucumcari Rattlers and "Little Schoolgirl" by Sonny Boy Williamson.

No.	Title	Length
1.	"Army Brat"	2:58
2.	"Grab the Wheel"	2:49
3.	"3-Banger"	4:07
4.	"Let It Die"	3:44
5.	"Open You Up"	2:15
6.	"My Boss"	2:29
7.	"Kiss It"	3:22
8.	"Little Schoolgirl"	3:32
9.	"Best Enemies"	3:33
10.	"Mas Suicide"	10:25

== Personnel ==
The Heroine Sheiks

- John Fell – drums
- Eric Eble – bass guitar, keyboards on "My Boss"
- Shannon Selberg – vocals, keyboards, bugle
- Norman Westberg – guitar

Production and additional personnel

- Greg Gordon – production, mixing, recording
- The Heroine Sheiks – production
- Scott Hill – keyboards on "Kiss It"
- Alex Lipsen – engineering
- Dan Long – engineering
- Scott Norton – engineering
- Greg Vaughn – mastering
