= John Fell (drummer) =

American drummer

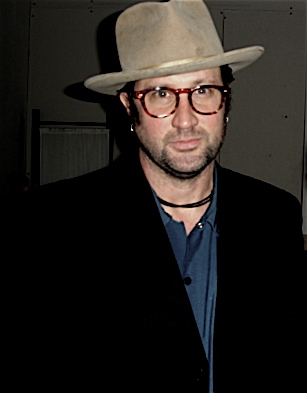
- John Fell

Background information
- Born: John Whittum Fell; May 28, 1961 (age 65); New York, NY
- Genres: Punk rock, rock, prog rock
- Occupation: Drummer
- Instrument: Drums
- Years active: 30 –
- Labels: Rubric, London, Amphetamine Reptile, CBS, Warner Brothers, Reptillian, TK, Backbone Ltd.
- Members: Naux, China Shop, Shannon Selberg, The Cows, Norman Westberg, Swans

John Fell is an American drummer. Born in New York City in 1961 to academic parents, he came into prominence in the early 1980s playing with rock/reggae/Latin band from Miami named "Watchdog". He is the co-owner of Main Drag Music located in Williamsburg. There, he creates custom snares, and repairs and sells drums. He has been listed on a number of lists of great drummers.

== History ==
The band had a large following in south Florida fronted by Alonso Brito, then known as Dennis Britt and opened and headlined large venues as well as weekly engagements at various local clubs. Watchdog was recorded and mixed by Ron and Howard Albert, known collectively as the Albert Brothers at Criteria Studios in Miami. He was one of the first drummers in that area who used electronic drums along with samples and a drum machine, specifically the Linn 9000, E-mu SP-1200, Emulator II, and Simmons Drums SDS7 and Simmons SDSV . Due to the incredible demand of electronic drums at this point, he managed to find a great deal of session and tour work with bands and individuals including The Isolator, Miami Sound Machine, Perfect Strangers, Jimi Fiano, Gordon Hart, Henk Milne, Paris Maria, Ann Monaco, Randy Rush, as well as many calls for television and radio work.

== China Shop, Gentleman Farmers, and the 80's ==
After two years in Florida, he moved back to his native New York City and found himself working with Naux, from Richard Hell and the Voidoids in a band called China Shop, recording two records. Prior to China Shop was a band with Naux, Jennifer Smith, and Larry Heinemann called Gentleman Farmers, who never released anything yet recorded with Mike McMackin. As well as a steady schedule of live and studio work, Fell recorded, toured, played with many bands and individuals, including Mercurial Line, Joan Jett, Rope, The Loveless, Jorma Kaukonen, Bankie Banx, Polio Ponies, Joe Walsh, and many others.

== Kelly Township ==
In 1994 he joined a band called Kelly Township that was immediately signed to London Records after then Vice President Russ Rieger demanded their signing, and did a record produced by Ted Nicely who had recorded Fugazi, Shudder to Think, Girls Against Boys, and Jawbox. When things went badly at London due to internal problems they moved to Reprise Records under Sue Drew and were dropped. Kelly Township explored a mix of drugs and sexuality in their lyrics and were part of a huge frenzy when they first began playing in 1994. Originally the vocals were handled by Ali Smith, later of Speedball Baby, and then were taken over by Ike Machamer, the band's main writer and founder. There were high expectations for Kelly Township, but the band broke up.

== Heroine Sheiks ==
Shortly after Fell joined ex-Cows singer Shannon Selberg and ex Swans guitarist Norman Westberg, forming a true downtown supergroup called The Heroine Sheiks. Joined by Ultra Bide bassist George Porfiris, The Heroine Sheiks released an initial 12" single "(We Are The) Heroine Sheiks" on Amphetamine Reptile, then Rape on the Installment Plan on Reptilian Records (this title a reference to Celine's novel Death on the Installment Plan) followed by Siamese Pipe on Rubric Records. Critically acclaimed, the records sold well, but Fell left the band after rupturing his eardrums on tour. This coincided with Westberg leaving, and Fell was unable to play for many months. The Heroine Sheiks then reformed with the remaining remnants of Brooklyn band The Sons of Mata Hari (bassist Rob Kimball, drummer Eric Robe and guitarist Martin Ros) and went on to release two more albums, Out of Aferica and (returning to Celine's Journey to the End of the Night), Journey to the End of the Knife.

== Current bands ==
Recently Fell has been performing with Kid Congo Powers of the Cramps, Gun Club, and Nick Cave and the Bad Seeds along with another downtown legend Jack Martin, who was also in Cause For Applause along with David Lloyd of The Boggs along with Jonathan Toubin formerly of Grand Mal. Fell was not the original drummer for this band and recorded tracks for Say Hey Records but they were never released. Cause For Applause was welcomed by New York and sold well but various problems hampered the groups' success.

== Equipment used ==
Always trying new sounds has been a big part of Fell's success. As one of the first to use Simmons Electronic drums along with drum machines live, he often had to resort to complicated fabrication in order to mix the sounds. When MIDI came out he applied it and used it to simplify his set though at this point he was starting to get back into acoustic drums and began a long relationship with Sonor drums. Fell used Sonors in many different contexts, but using them with The Heroine Sheiks was very unusual in the world of Indie Rock which usually finds people using lo-fi gear. He then brought back a Ludwig stainless steel kit identical to the one John Bonham used in the later days of Led Zeppelin that he had owned for many years. It was huge and powerful and complimented The Heroine Sheiks heavy sound perfectly. His cymbal selection varied but usually was Paiste due to endorsement and often included a mix of 2002's and Signature Series.

== Main Drag Music ==
Fell is co-owner of Main Drag Music located in Williamsburg Brooklyn, where he creates custom snares, and repairs and sells drums. At times he is known to do drum tech work for John Agnello, Jojo Mayer, Mark Guiliana, Headgear Studio, Metrosonic Studios, and others. He records and plays in the New York area though seems to have stepped out of the world of touring.

== Lists ==
Fell's drumming has found him at 94 on The 100 Greatest Drummers In Rock according to MajorGeeks Forums. "Known as a powerful and exciting player with a knack for rhythmic complexity and speed he has been a vital contribution to drumming."

== Reviews and press ==
- https://web.archive.org/web/20110715093927/http://www.playbackstl.com/content/view/140/162/
- https://web.archive.org/web/20070816231904/http://www.pitchforkmedia.com/article/record_review/18468-siamese-pipe?artist_title=18468-siamese-pipe
- http://www.markprindle.com/heroine.htm
- http://www.grunnenrocks.nl/bands/h/heroinesheiks.htm
