= Leaving Meaning =

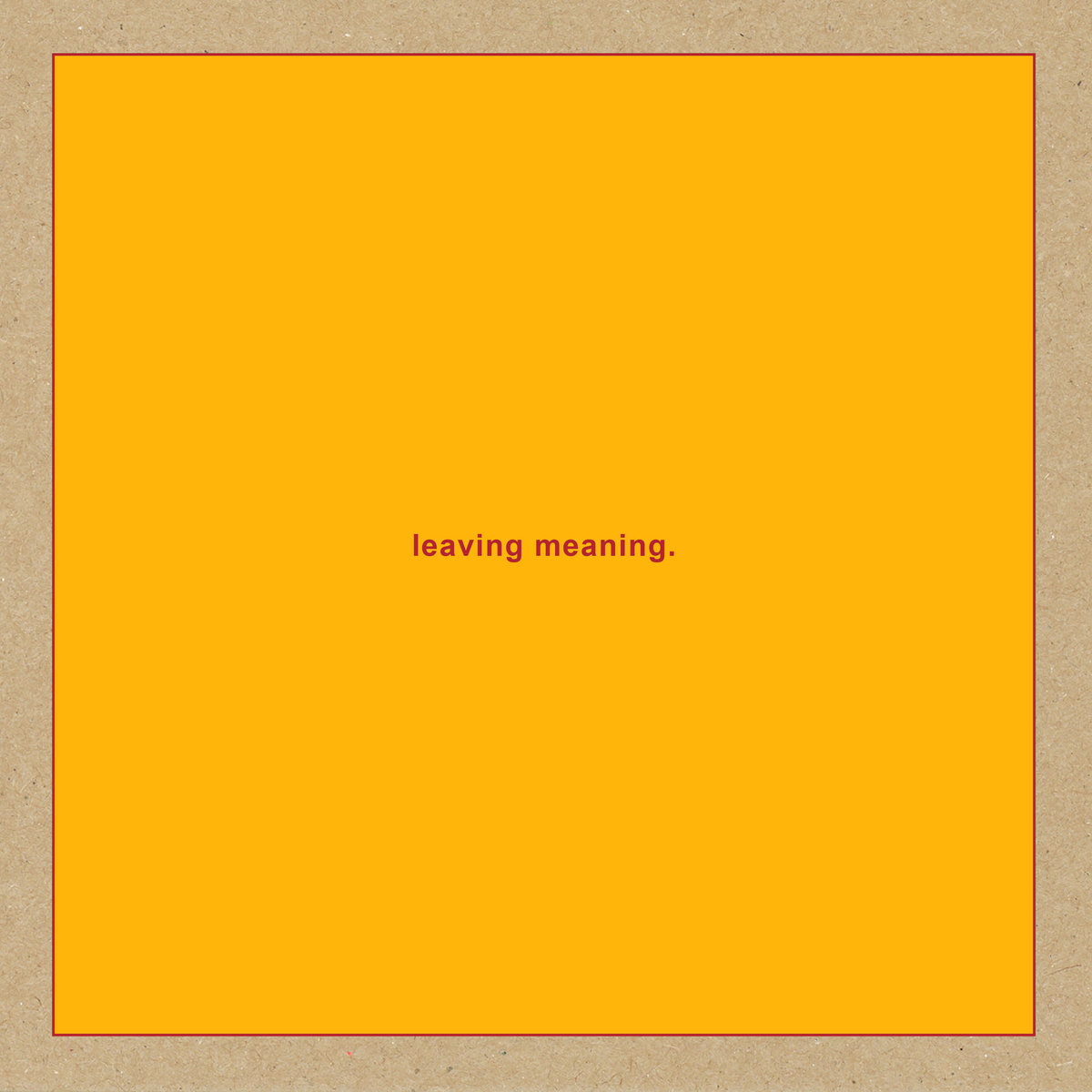

Studio album by Swans
- Released: October 25, 2019
- Recorded: March 11 – July 23, 2019
- Studio: Candy Bomber, Berlin, Germany; Ben Frost studio, Reykjavik, Iceland; Sonido del Norte, Albuquerque, NM, USA; Seizure's Palace, Brooklyn, NY, USA
- Genre: Experimental rock
- Length: 93:10 (CD version); 82:34 (vinyl version)
- Label: Young God; Mute
- Producer: Michael Gira

Swans chronology
What Is This? (2019)	Leaving Meaning (2019)	Is There Really a Mind? (2022)

Singles from Leaving Meaning
- 1. "It's Coming It's Real" Released: September 5, 2019; 2. "The Hanging Man" Released: October 10, 2019

Leaving Meaning (stylized as leaving meaning.) is the fifteenth studio album by American experimental band Swans. It was released October 25, 2019, on Young God and Mute. A double album, Leaving Meaning's songs have been mixed separately for vinyl and CD releases, with the CD version of the album containing the original (and extended) mixes of the songs, as well as an additional track, "Some New Things". As with all Swans' releases of the 2010s, Leaving Meaning was financed by a fundraiser album – in this case, What Is This? in March 2019.

== Critical reception ==
Professional ratings
Aggregate scores
Source	Rating
AnyDecentMusic?	7.5/10
Metacritic	75/100
Review scores
Source	Rating
AllMusic	3/5 stars
Exclaim!	7/10
The Line of Best Fit	9/10
Mojo	4/5 stars
MusicOMH	4/5 stars
Pitchfork	7.7/10
Q	4/5 stars
Record Collector	4/5 stars
Slant Magazine	3/5 stars
Uncut	8/10

Upon its release, Leaving Meaning received mostly positive reviews from music critics. At Metacritic, which assigns a normalized rating out of 100 to reviews from mainstream publications, Leaving Meaning received an average score of 75, based on 16 reviews, indicating "generally favorable reviews". Andrew Perry of Mojo gave the album a favorable review, comparing it partly to The Burning World and writing, "Whatever the sonic weather, Gira's spiritual austerity remains unimpaired."

=== Accolades ===
Publication	Accolade	Rank	Ref.
Les Inrocks	Top 100 Albums of 2019	98	
Magnet	Top 25 Albums of 2019	23	
Mondo Sonoro	Top 40 Albums of 2019	18	
Rough Trade	Top 100 Albums of 2019	19	

== Track listing ==
=== CD & digital version ===
All tracks are written by Michael Gira, except "Hums" by Gira, Kristof Hahn, Christopher Pravdica, Norman Westberg

Disc one
No.	Title	Length
1.	"Hums"	2:00
2.	"Annaline"	5:17
3.	"The Hanging Man"	10:48
4.	"Amnesia"	5:49
5.	"Leaving Meaning"	11:21
6.	"Sunfucker"	10:43
Total length:		45:58

Disc two
No.	Title	Length
7.	"Cathedrals of Heaven"	7:49
8.	"The Nub"	12:01
9.	"It's Coming It's Real"	7:42
10.	"Some New Things"	7:09
11.	"What Is This?"	6:05
12.	"My Phantom Limb"	6:26
Total length:		47:12

=== Vinyl version ===
All tracks are written by Michael Gira, except "Hums" by Gira, Kristof Hahn, Christopher Pravdica, Norman Westberg

Vinyl version (Side A)
No.	Title	Length
1.	"Annaline"	5:17
2.	"The Hanging Man" (shortened mix)	9:55
3.	"Amnesia"	5:49
Total length:		21:01

Vinyl version (Side B)
No.	Title	Length
1.	"Leaving Meaning" (shortened mix)	10:37
2.	"Sunfucker" (shortened mix)	10:22
Total length:		20:59

Vinyl version (Side C)
No.	Title	Length
1.	"Hums" (shortened mix)	1:46
2.	"Cathedrals of Heaven"	7:49
3.	"The Nub" (shortened mix)	10:59
Total length:		20:34

Vinyl version (Side D)
No.	Title	Length
1.	"It's Coming It's Real" (shortened mix)	7:29
2.	"What Is This?"	6:05
3.	"My Phantom Limb"	6:26
Total length:		20:00

== Personnel ==
Adapted from the official Young God Records website and album liner notes:

Swans

- Michael Gira – vocals, acoustic guitar and electric guitar, production, art design
- Kristof Hahn – lap steel guitar, electric guitar, acoustic guitar, backing vocals
- Larry Mullins – drums, percussion, vibes, Mellotron, keyboards, synth, backing vocals
- Yoyo Röhm – electric bass guitar, double bass, keyboards, piano, synth, backing vocals

Previous Swans

- Thor Harris – percussion, trumpet, clarinet, sounds, bells, gizmos, additional vibes
- Christopher Pravdica – bass guitar, sounds
- Phil Puleo – hammered dulcimer ("Amnesia"), art layout and execution
- Norman Westberg – electric guitar
- Paul Wallfisch – piano

Guests

- Chris Abrahams (The Necks) – piano, organ ("The Nub", "Leaving Meaning")
- Tony Buck (The Necks) – drums, percussion ("The Nub", "Leaving Meaning", "Some New Things")
- Lloyd Swanton (The Necks) – double bass ("The Nub", "Leaving Meaning")
- Baby Dee – lead vocal ("The Nub")
- Fay Christen – backing vocals ("The Nub")
- Ida Albertje Michels – backing vocals ("The Nub")
- Cassis Staudt – accordion, harmonium (on various songs)
- Anna von Hausswolff – choral/backing vocals ("Sunfucker", "Amnesia", "It's Coming Real")
- Maria von Hausswolff – choral/backing vocals ("Sunfucker", "Amnesia", "It's Coming Real")
- Ben Frost – guitar, synths, sound manipulations (throughout), engineer
- Jennifer Gira – various backing vocals (throughout), cameo vocal ("Sunfucker")
- Jeremy Barnes (A Hawk and a Hacksaw) – santur, hi-hat, fiddlesticks, accordion, engineering
- Heather Trost (A Hawk and a Hacksaw) – Stroh violin, violin, viola, fiddlesticks, engineering
- Dana Schechter – bass ("Some New Things"), sounds
- Mika Bajinksi – additional backing vocals
- Marie-Claire Schlameus – additional backing vocals
- Swan Gira – laughter
- Saoirse Gira – laughter
- Tatiana Hahn – host

Other contributors

- Ingo Krauss – engineer on basic tracks at Candy Bomber Studio, Berlin; mixing
- Jason LaFarge – engineer at Seizure's Palace, Brooklyn, NY
- Francesco Fabris – assistant engineer at Ben Frost studio, Reykjavik
- Sander Stuer – assistant engineer at Ben Frost studio, Reykjavik
- Doug Henderson – mastering
- Paul A. Taylor – art layout and execution

== Charts ==
Chart (2019)	Peak position
Austrian Albums (Ö3 Austria)	73
Belgian Albums (Ultratop Flanders)	93
Belgian Albums (Ultratop Wallonia)	156
German Albums (Offizielle Top 100)	58
Scottish Albums (OCC)	34
Spanish Albums (PROMUSICAE)	70
Swiss Albums (Schweizer Hitparade)	77
