= Anonymous Bodies in an Empty Room =

1990 album

Live album by Swans
- Released: 1990
- Recorded: 1988–1989
- Length: 42:19
- Producer: Michael Gira

Swans chronology
| The Burning World (1989) | Anonymous Bodies in an Empty Room (1990) | White Light from the Mouth of Infinity (1991) |

Professional ratings
Review scores
| Source | Rating |
|---|---|
| Allmusic | 3/5 stars |

Anonymous Bodies in an Empty Room is the fourth live album by the New York City band Swans. It was recorded from shows on their The Burning World tour.

== Track listing ==
| No. | Title | Length |
|---|---|---|
| 1. | "Let It Come Down (from The Burning World)" | 7:19 |
| 2. | "Blood on Your Hands (from The World of Skin's Blood, Women, Roses)" | 3:10 |
| 3. | "Untitled Excerpt" (†) | 2:36 |
| 4. | "Will We Survive (Released later on White Light from the Mouth of Infinity)" | 6:16 |
| 5. | "See No More (from The Burning World)" | 5:52 |
| 6. | "Still a Child (from The World of Skin's Blood, Women, Roses)" | 4:47 |
| 7. | "(She's a) Universal Emptiness (From The Burning World)" | 5:15 |
| 8. | "Miracle of Love (Released later on White Light from the Mouth of Infinity)" | 6:56 |

†The second half of an unreleased song from 1988 entitled "A Young Girl Needs More". This and another song, "The Unknown", appeared only in live form during that tour.
