= Filth (Swans album) =

Studio album by Swans
- Released: May 27, 1983
- Recorded: April 1983
- Studio: Vanguard in New York City
- Genre: No wave; noise rock; industrial rock; post-punk
- Length: 36:46
- Label: Neutral
- Producer: Michael Gira; Roli Mosimann

Swans chronology
Swans (1982)	Filth (1983)	Cop (1984)

Filth is the debut studio album by American experimental rock band Swans. It was released on May 27, 1983 through Neutral Records, following the release of the band's self-titled debut EP in 1982. Though it did not receive much contemporary attention, Filth has since been recognized as ahead of its time and significant to heavy genres of music.

Musically, the album is bleak, grinding, and deliberately repetitive, defined by two bassists persistently doubling over the same chord. The two drummers, Jonathan Kane and Roli Mosimann, play chaotically and angularly, occasionally mixing in percussion from metal straps striking tables, and the distorted guitar of Norman Westberg plays in a grating fashion. The vocals of Swans frontman Michael Gira are scathing and direct, covering topics of social decay, corruption, rape, and abuse of power.

== Background ==
After the release of Swans' 1982 debut EP, frontman Michael Gira and drummer Jonathan Kane were the only members to remain in the band. In 1983, when the band began work on its first full-length release, Gira was poor and sustained himself by doing occasional labor in the construction industry. New York City was, as Gira described, "in the throes of decay"; his neighborhood mainly consisted of derelict buildings, and he often heard gunfire during the night. This bleak environment proved vital not only for the crushing sound of Swans' early material, but for the no wave genre at large. Also important to the conception of Filth was the blues genre, which helped Kane define the "crawling" and "brutal" swing of the music. Because Gira wanted a more rigid, stiff percussion style, Kane left after recording Filth, though some of his swinging style persisted through the second drummer, Roli Mosimann.

Filth saw the introduction of Norman Westberg to Swans, who would remain a primary contributor throughout much of the band's career. Gira described Westberg's playing as "a vast, sustaining chordal sound", and the latter's addition to the band helped solidify it as a serious musical venture; previously, Swans had been fueled by "constant bickering, haranguing, and pervasive mean-spiritedness", according to Kane. Filth was recorded in the studio of Vanguard Records, a place that Gira described as "massive" and "very famous" and that Kane called "beautiful" with "high ceilings and great acoustics". Gira played bass and shouted vocals, Kane played drums, Mosimann played drums and occasionally struck hard surfaces with a metal strap, Westberg provided guitar, and another new member, Harry Crosby, also played bass. The cover of the album came from Mosimann's girlfriend, a dental assistant, who had spare X-ray photographs at hand.

== Composition ==
=== Overview ===
"I wanted Swans to be 'heavier', though. I wanted the music to obliterate — why, I don’t remember! I think it just felt good."

—Michael Gira on the tone of Filth

Musically, Filth is a heavy album often noted by critics for its uncompromising noise and brutality; AllMusic's Ned Raggett described it as "angry-beyond-all-anger", and Sasha Geffen of Consequence of Sound called it the "ugliest, most brutal music possible". The sound of Filth is defined by the band's unusual composition: two bass players, two drummers (both of which have access to miscellaneous percussive items), and one guitarist all accompanied by a series of programmed tape loops. Though based in the then-dying genre of no wave, Kory Grow of Rolling Stone recognized Filth as "primal art rock at its most vitriolic" and as anticipatory of industrial music, sludge metal, and noise rock; Metal Hammer's Chris Chantler also recognized Filth and other early Swans material as integral to the development of sludge metal. Gene Armstrong of the Arizona Daily Star described Filth as "an industrial-strength brand of grinding dirge-rock". Some publications criticized the album for being, as Trouser Press put it, "squalor without catharsis", but many saw this unrelenting nature as captivating and unique. Filth presents its music as walls of noise, or "slabs of sound"; Gira would come up with simple bass chords and simply "slam" them repeatedly without much change, clanging rhythms of both traditional drums and more unusual instruments (like metal tables) were then built around that, resulting in a "roar" driven by overwhelming sound rather than a predetermined beat.

The lyrics of Filth and its following albums deal with "violence, extreme sex, power, rage, and the margins of human depravity", according to AllMusic's Thom Jurek. The words, often delivered as shouts or misanthropic wails, focus on both social and personal decay in a directly bleak way. Gira described his vocals as "screaming/testifying", and Jake Cole of Spectrum Culture called them "locked into an endless loop of provocation, filled with unending allusions to violence, rot and rape". In a positive review of the album, Robert Christgau sardonically wrote, "lyrics are available to suckers on request". Despite the dismal, overwhelming nature of the music, some critics called the album occasionally danceable. Gira retrospectively recognized the Stooges and Throbbing Gristle as primary inspirations for Filth.

=== Songs ===
"Stay Here"
"Stay Here" showcases the album's aggression and Gira's misanthropic vocals.

"Power for Power"
"Power for Power" highlights the album's occasional melody and mournful tone.

"Weakling"
"Weakling" is an example of the album's rare jaunty dance quality.

Filth is relatively brief, lasting only thirty-seven minutes. It begins with "Stay Here", which instantly conveys the distorted aggression of the album with chaotic, conflicting drumming, lurching basses, and squealing guitar. Gira repeatedly shouts commands like "be strong", "resist temptation", and "flex your muscles", occasionally inserting a more enigmatic order, like "stick your hand in your eye". As it is with much of the album, "Stay Here" is based upon grinding repetition; Andrew Hannah of The Line of Best Fit described this by writing, "the song goes nowhere but it’s utterly enthralling". Jason Heller of Pitchfork called "Stay Here" angular, disjointed, bone-crushing, and industrialized. The album's second track, "Big Strong Boss", stumbles into an unusual, halting rhythm and Westberg's guitar becomes clearer. Hannah called the song "leeringly sexual" and "unforgiving in its crude approach", and Joseph Rowan of Drowned in Sound compared it to early Killing Joke.

"Blackout", the third track of Filth, is a slow, crushing song where the guitar strings "are so loose to lower the pitch that they take on a kind of rubber-band twang when plucked", according to Cole. Gira barks the song's title, and the rhythms prove "weirdly danceable". The fourth song, "Power for Power", is the album's longest at six minutes. Geffen highlighted it as an essential track and described its beat as deep and lurching. The lyrics are typically harrowing, with lines like "use power for power", "use money for cruelty", and "use hate for freedom", and Treblezine's Jeff Terich called it "the most terrifying song you can possibly dance to". The guitar carries a rare, albeit strained, melody. The album's fifth track, "Freak", is a minute-long noise interlude focused on cacophonous tape loops. Some critics called it close to thrash metal and even grindcore.

Filth's sixth song, "Right Wrong", is, like its title suggests, confused and contradictory. Heller called it a study in disjointed animosity, and Terich recognized some Kane's swinging style in the groove. "Thank You", the seventh track, "pulses with the classic goth-rock chug of Bauhaus" and the rhythm is a cycle of repeating pummels. The album's eighth and penultimate song, "Weakling", is another overwhelming tug of war between the basses and drumming. Heller wrote that the song "doesn’t denigrate the submissive; this isn’t fascist music, as its unforgiving textures might indicate, but a profound inversion of power". Filth concludes with "Gang", a slow, aggressive song with numerous starts and stops. Cole wrote that it "erupts from the mouth of hell itself as clanging instruments tumble slowly down a hill and Gira, the Charon guiding these damned souls, commands his followers to attack an assailant".

=== Body to Body, Job to Job ===
In 1991, a compilation album titled Body to Body, Job to Job was released through Swans' own label, Young God Records. This release consisted of unreleased live and studio recordings between the years 1982 and 1985, including some tracks made during and around the Filth sessions. Several of the songs are simple, experimental tape loops that went otherwise unused and were left off Filth. The majority of this release, however, focused on Swans' second album, 1984's Cop.

== Release and reception ==
Filth was released in May 1983 through Neutral Records and Zensor in Europe, where most of the band's audience resided. Initially, the album was only available on vinyl, but it was reissued in 1990 on CD along with the band's debut EP. Neutral Records again reissued Filth in 2012, but Gira confirmed this to be a bootleg. The album was properly reissued in 2015 in a remastered state with two extra discs of bonus material, including the previously released Body to Body, Job to Job compilation. This version was marketed as a "a definitive, comprehensive document of Swans during the time period 1982 – 1985".

=== Critical reception ===
Professional ratings
Review scores
Source	Rating
AllMusic	3/5 stars
Consequence of Sound	B+
Drowned in Sound	8/10
The Line of Best Fit	9/10
Ondarock	7.5/10
Pitchfork	8.1/10
Punknews.org	5/5 stars
Spin Alternative Record Guide	4/10
Spectrum Culture	3.75/5
The Village Voice	B+

Upon release, Filth did not receive much critical attention. The Village Voice's Robert Christgau reviewed the album positively in 1984, writing, "Not only isn't it for everybody, it isn't for hardly nobody. I think it's a hoot". Past that, retrospective reviews of Filth were positive. The Line of Best Fit's Andrew Hannah called the album "a brilliant work of art" and praised how, despite being from 1983, it still sounded "uncompromising and utterly vital" in 2014 (a sentiment that Alex Biese of Asbury Park Press echoed). Jason Heller of Pitchfork appreciated the brutality of Filth and noted how it effectively established what Swans would become, and Joseph Rowan of Drowned in Sound highlighted the album as a nearly perfect form of intense, angry music burdened with the downside of becoming exhausting; in a more middling review, AllMusic's Ned Raggett concurred that Filth becomes tiring in its latter moments, but said, "in small doses, though, it's great, and early Swans really is like little else on the planet before or since". Jake Cole of Spectrum Culture wrote, "the music presented in this collection often sounds like a preemptive parody of Swans’ most extreme moments rather than the first instances of them, but, when it connects, the visceral impact of this fearsome band is evident from the start". The Pittsburgh Post-Gazette's Scott Mervis said that Filth makes "most punk and metal seem like ear candy by comparison".

In 2012, Aaron Lariviere of Stereogum, though still positive on the album, ranked Filth as the second worst Swans album, writing, "Repeated listens reveal a band in full control of the clamor they're creating, but these aren't songs as much as a pure expression of artistic intent". In 2014, John Calvert of Fact wrote, "A milestone in extreme music — a sound heavier, more vicious and more all-out evil-sounding than any metal band had produced by 1983 — with Filth, Swans took the rock form a few gargantuan steps forward". Retrospectively, Gira, Westberg, and Kane all expressed lingering reservations about the album.

== Track listing ==
All lyrics are written by Michael Gira; all music is composed by Swans (Gira, Jonathan Kane, Roli Mosimann, Norman Westberg, Harry Crosby).

Side A
No.	Title	Length
1.	"Stay Here"	5:35
2.	"Big Strong Boss"	3:02
3.	"Blackout"	3:47
4.	"Power for Power"	5:52

Side B
No.	Title	Length
1.	"Freak"	1:13
2.	"Right Wrong"	4:43
3.	"Thank You"	3:52
4.	"Weakling"	5:20
5.	"Gang"	3:18
Total length:		36:46

2015 3CD remaster (disc one bonus track)
No.	Title	Length
10.	"Live at The Kitchen NYC 1982/3: "1. Strip/Burn"; "2. Heatsheet"; "3. Blackout"; "4. Clay Man"; "5. Stay Here"; "6. Weakling"	24:25
Total length:		61:11

2015 3CD remaster (disc two, Body to Body)
No.	Title	Length
1.	"I'll Cry for You"	5:41
2.	"Red Sheet"	3:11
3.	"Loop 33"	0:59
4.	"Your Game"	3:57
5.	"Seal it Over"	3:48
6.	"Whore"	3:56
7.	"We'll Hang for That"	3:55
8.	"Half Life"	3:57
9.	"Loop 21"	1:26
10.	"Get Out"	3:31
11.	"Job"	5:40
12.	"Loop 1"	1:01
13.	"Mother, My Body Disgusts Me"	4:43
14.	"Cop"	5:56
15.	"Only I Can Hear, Only I Can Touch"	2:41
16.	"Thug"	9:44
17.	"Raping a Slave" (Live Berlin, 1984)	9:02
Total length:		73:08

2015 3CD remaster (disc three, EP#1 Plus Live Recordings)
No.	Title	Length
1.	"Laugh"	4:09
2.	"Speak"	4:28
3.	"Take Advantage"	4:35
4.	"Sensitive Skin"	6:17
5.	"Living Arms" (Live at CBGB NYC 1982/83)	3:26
6.	"Howling Red Sheet" (Live at CBGB NYC 1982/83)	3:40
7.	"Big Strong Boss" (Live at CBGB NYC 1982/83)	2:46
8.	"Clay Man" (Live at CBGB NYC 1982/83)	4:56
9.	"We'll Hang for That" (Live at CBGB NYC 1982/83)	4:38
10.	"This Is Mine" (Live at Heaven London 1984)	7:02
11.	"Why Hide" (Live at Heaven London 1984)	8:36
12.	"I Crawled" (Live at Heaven London 1984)	7:06
Total length:		61:39

== Personnel ==
Credits adapted from Filth liner notes

Swans

- Michael Gira – bass guitar, vocals, lyrics, tapes, production
- Jonathan Kane – drums, percussion
- Roli Mosimann – drums, percussion, tapes, production
- Norman Westberg – guitar
- Harry Crosby – bass guitar

Additional musicians

- Sonda Andersson – mechanicals
- Sue Hanel – guitar (track 2 on disc 2, tracks 3 to 9 on disc 3)
- Daniel Galli-Duani – saxophone (tracks 1 to 4 on disc 3)
- Jonathan Tessler – electronics, tapes, loops
- Bob Pezzola – guitar (tracks 1 to 4 on disc 3)

Technical personnel

- Mark Berry – engineering
- Catherine Ceresole – photography
- Nicolas Ceresole – photography
- Lee Ranaldo – photography
- Paul A. Taylor – layout
- Doug Henderson – mastering
- Greg Curry – engineering (tracks 1 to 4 on disc 3)
- Ray Bardani – engineering (tracks 1 to 4 on disc 3)
- Susan Martin – production (tracks 1 to 4 on disc 3)

== Chart performance ==
Chart (2014)	Peak position
US Billboard Vinyl Albums	12
