= A Screw =

1986 EP

Single by Swans
- Released: 2 May 1986
- Genre: Industrial
- Length: 15:02
- Label: K.422
- Producer: Michael Gira

Swans singles chronology
"Time Is Money (Bastard)" (1986)	"A Screw" (1986)	"New Mind" (1987)

Professional ratings
Review scores
Source	Rating
AllMusic	4/5 stars

A Screw is a single by the New York City experimental rock group Swans. The single's three songs were later appended as bonus tracks to the CD release of Holy Money.

== Background and composition ==
The title track sees the band diving their furthest into the realm of industrial dance music, complete with dubby, distorted vocals and complex programmed rhythms, a distinct contrast to the naturalistic album version. The piano-driven ode to obsessive love, "Blackmail", was Jarboe's first Swans track as lead vocalist. A reworked version of "Blackmail" appears on the 1987 album Children of God.

Regarding his contribution to the single's title track, drummer Ted Parsons said:

"But you know the first recording I did with Swans, was "A Screw" on Holy Money? I get in there – I can’t remember what the studio was – and Michael Gira the singer said, "Well, you know what? There’s no drum kit here, we just want to set a snare drum up in the hallway and have you hit it." And I was like, "What? OK." So they set the snare up in this big hallway down this corridor, and I hit the drum, and that was it. They sampled it, and he said, "OK, that’s great, go home." That was it. That was "A Screw.""

== Track listing ==
No.	Title	Length
1.	"A Screw"	5:40
2.	"Blackmail"	4:42
3.	"A Screw (Holy Money)" (Mix)	4:58
Total length:		15:20

Notes

- Track 1 and 3 were mislabeled on most original releases. Later issues like the "Greed/Holy Money" compilation corrected this.

== Personnel ==
- Michael Gira – vocals, samples, sounds, piano, bass
- Norman Westberg – guitar
- Harry Crosby – bass
- Algis Kizys – bass
- Jarboe – vocals, backing vocals, mirage
- Ronaldo Gonzalez – drums
- Ted Parsons – drums
- Ivan Nahem – drums
- Greg Grinnell – trumpet
- Keene Carse – trombone

== Charts ==
Chart (1986)	Peak position
UK Indie Chart	4
