= Rape on the Installment Plan =

Rape On The Installment Plan

Studio album by The Heroine Sheiks
- Released: September 20, 2000
- Recorded: Loho Studios and Schoolhouse Studios, New York City
- Genre: Noise rock
- Length: 32:44
- Label: Reptilian Records
- Producer: Greg Gordon, The Heroine Sheiks

The Heroine Sheiks chronology
| Rape On The Installment Plan (2000) | Siamese Pipe (2002) |

Professional ratings
Review scores
| Source | Rating |
|---|---|
| AllMusic | 3/5 stars |

Rape on the Installment Plan is the first album by The Heroine Sheiks. It was released on September 20, 2000, by Reptilian Records.

== Critical reception ==
AllMusic wrote that "from this radioactive sea-foam of New York art-scum noise -- from guitarist Norman Westberg -- and left-field Midwestern acid-damaged punk rock -- from vocalist Shannon Selberg -- comes a wacko, purely crystallized noise rock revival album."

== Track listing ==
All lyrics are written by Shannon Selberg; all music is composed by The Heroine Sheiks.

| No. | Title | Length |
|---|---|---|
| 1. | "Wandering Mongrel" | 3:25 |
| 2. | "Nuclear Jeannie" | 3:32 |
| 3. | "Okkk?" | 2:58 |
| 4. | "Jew Jitsu" | 3:23 |
| 5. | "Space Invader" | 5:55 |
| 6. | "Was a Man" | 3:03 |
| 7. | "Let's Fight" | 2:52 |
| 8. | "You Never" | 3:35 |
| 9. | "I Got Doubts" | 2:16 |
| 10. | "Effity Eff" | 1:45 |

== Personnel ==
The Heroine Sheiks

- John Fell – drums
- Scott Hill – keyboards
- George Porfiris – bass guitar
- Shannon Selberg – vocals, keyboards, bugle
- Norman Westberg – guitar

Production and additional personnel

- Greg Gordon – production, engineering
- The Heroine Sheiks – production
- Joe Hogan – engineering
- Doug Milton – mastering
