= Virgil Moorefield =

American composer and intermedia artist (born 1956)

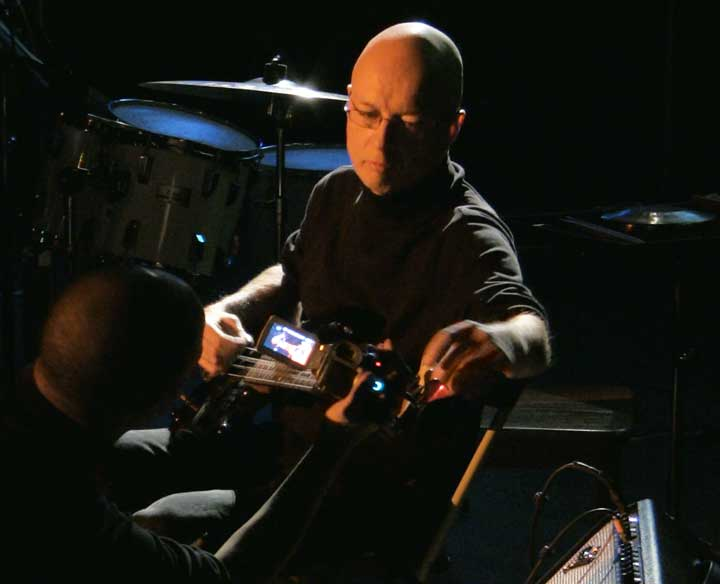

Background information
- Born: August 9, 1956 (age 70); Chapel Hill, North Carolina, US
- Genres: Contemporary classical; experimental
- Occupations: Composer; intermedia artist
- Instruments: Drums; keyboards; guitar
- Years active: 1980–present
- Labels: Tzadik, Cuneiform, Innova, Hinterzimmer, Slipped Disc
- Website: www.virgilmoorefield.com

Virgil Moorefield (born August 9, 1956) is a composer and intermedia artist based in Rüschlikon, Switzerland.

Moorefield's work focuses primarily on live acoustic performance, electronic processing of acoustic signals, and live visual music ("Five Ideas About the Relation of Sight and Sound"). CDs of his composer-led ensembles have been released on several labels, including Tzadik, Cuneiform, and Innova. His compositions are informed by his identity as a drummer. He is also the author of The Producer as Composer, published by MIT Press.

== Biography ==
Moorefield was born into a family of musicians and teachers. At the age of five, he began drumming. By the time he was ten, he spoke three languages fluently, the result of having gone to public elementary schools in Italy, the United States, and Switzerland. Moorefield attended the American International School of Zurich (AISZ), giving various performances as a drummer-composer in Zürich at the age of 17. He then received a B.A. and an M.A. in English from Columbia University, where he was a student of Edward Said. In 1979, Moorefield moved to the East Village of New York City and began a career as a composer, teaching himself along the way. His first recording, Transformations, scored for big band with electric guitars and horns, appeared in 1983. In the mid-Eighties, he began performing with rock bands such as Damage and K-Martians, which led to a stint with experimental rock band Swans. Around the same time, Moorefield joined the Glenn Branca Ensemble, touring and recording with them until 2008. Beginning in 1994, Moorefield has released CDs of his composer-led ensembles on various labels. In the early Nineties, he led a nine-piece group that performed meticulously notated avant-rock in Europe and the U.S.

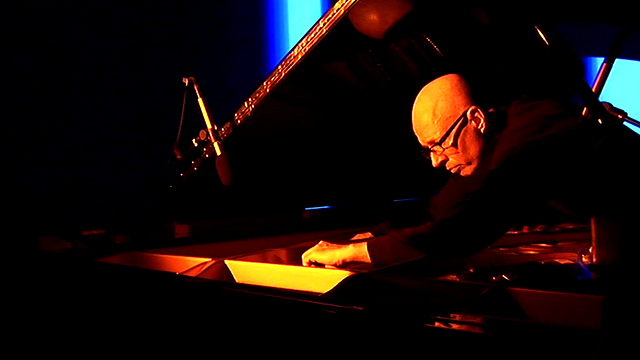
Moorefield at Maiers Theater in Zürich, Switzerland, 2011

For performances at various festivals in the mid-Nineties as well as on his Tzadik Records release, Moorefield experimented with a loosely structured hybrid between compositional and improvisational processes, coining the term "comprovisation" to describe his work of that period. In 1998 Moorefield received an M.F.A. in composition from Princeton University, where he studied with Paul Lansky, and a Ph.D. from the same institution in 2001. His dissertation, "The Producer As Composer", was published in expanded form as a hardcover (2005) and paperback (2010) by MIT Press. In the early 2000s, Moorefield began writing immersive intermedia works, at first collaboratively, and then as large-scale compositions. In 2013 he released a DVD of a large scale piece performed on three continents, "Five Ideas About the Relation of Sight and Sound".

== Selected discography ==
- Transformations (Slipped Disc)
- Distractions on the Way to The King's Party (Cuneiform Records)
- The Temperature in Hell Is Over Three Thousand Degrees (Tzadik)
- Things You Must Do to Get to Heaven (Innova)
- No Business As Usual/ Five Ideas About the Relation of Sight and Sound (CD + DVD, Hinterzimmer)

== Reviews ==
- New York Times
- Timeout
- Neue Zürcher Zeitung
- Allmusic
