= White Light from the Mouth of Infinity =

1991 studio album by Swans

Studio album by Swans
- Released: May 6, 1991
- Recorded: September 1990 – February 1991
- Studios: B. Monster, New York City, United States
- Genres: Post-punk; gothic rock; neofolk; psychedelic rock
- Length: 69:19
- Label: Young God
- Producer: Michael Gira

Swans chronology
Anonymous Bodies in an Empty Room (1990)	White Light from the Mouth of Infinity (1991)	Body to Body, Job to Job (1991)

White Light from the Mouth of Infinity is the seventh studio album by the American band Swans. It was released on May 6, 1991, in the United Kingdom, through Young God Records. The band supported the album with a North American tour.

In 2015, it was remastered and made available digitally and in a 3CD (and 3LP) set along with Love of Life and an album of bonus tracks.

== Critical reception ==
Professional ratings
Review scores
Source	Rating
AllMusic	4.5/5 stars
Drowned in Sound	8/10
Los Angeles Times	3/4 stars
Mojo	5/5 stars
NME	8/10
Ondarock	8.5/10
Pitchfork	7.9/10
PopMatters	9/10
Spectrum Culture	4/5 stars
Spin Alternative Record Guide	5/10

The Los Angeles Times wrote that Michael Gira's "search for heaven and hell—in both mind and body—continues on its fascinating, sometimes harrowing way."

AllMusic described the album as "stunning" and a "clear starting point for the second half of Swans' unique career."

== Track listing ==
All tracks are written by Michael Gira.

No.	Title	Length
1.	"Better Than You"	5:51
2.	"Power and Sacrifice"	5:37
3.	"You Know Nothing"	5:46
4.	"Song for Dead Time"	5:24
5.	"Will We Survive"	6:51
6.	"Love Will Save You"	6:06
7.	"Failure"	6:20
8.	"Song for the Sun"	5:03
9.	"Miracle of Love"	6:43
10.	"When She Breathes"	5:03
11.	"Why Are We Alive?"	5:29
12.	"The Most Unfortunate Lie"	5:02
Total length:		69:19

2015 remaster version
No.	Title	Length
1.	"Better Than You"	5:51
2.	"Power and Sacrifice"	5:36
3.	"You Know Nothing"	5:46
4.	"Song for Dead Time" (alternate version)	4:58
5.	"Will We Survive" (edited version)	5:59
6.	"Love Will Save You"	6:06
7.	"Failure"	6:20
8.	"Song for the Sun"	5:03
9.	"Miracle of Love"	6:43
10.	"Blind" (bonus track on reissue)	4:31
11.	"When She Breathes" (alternate version)	4:31
12.	"Why Are We Alive?" (extended version)	6:00
13.	"The Most Unfortunate Lie"	5:02
Total length:		72:26

== Personnel ==
- Michael Gira – vocals, backing vocals, acoustic guitar, keyboards, effects, samples, production
- Jarboe – vocals, backing vocals, keyboards, choral and orchestral arrangements
- Christoph Hahn – acoustic and electric guitar
- Clinton Steele – acoustic and electric guitar
- Norman Westberg – electric guitar on "Better than You"
- Jenny Wade – bass guitar
- Anton Fier – drums, drum programming
- Nicky Skopelitis – acoustic and electric guitar, baglama, bazouki, banjo
- Vincent Signorelli – percussion
- Hahn Rowe – violin
- Steve Burgh – mandolin, 12-string guitar
- J. G. Thirlwell – engineering, re-mix assistance, programming and co-production on "Power and Sacrifice"
- Bryce Goggin – engineering
- Steve McAllister – engineering, programming (additional)
- Deryk Thomas – front cover illustration
- John Sarfell – inner sleeve foldout painting
- Patricia Mooney – sleeve layout
- Brian Martin – re-mixing
- Alex Armitage – re-mix assistance

== Charts ==
Chart (2016)	Peak position
Belgian Albums (Ultratop Flanders)	195
