= Norman Westberg =

- Westberg performing with at Pianos in NYC in 2026

Background information
- Also known as: Norman Westberg
- Born: June 27, 1958 (age 68); Detroit, Michigan, U.S.
- Genres: Experimental rock; noise rock; experimental; post-punk; drone; ambient
- Occupation: Musician
- Instrument: Guitar
- Years active: 1982–present
- Member of: Swans
- Formerly of: Heroine Sheiks, Carnival Crash

Norman Westberg (born June 27, 1958) is an American guitarist best known for his work with Swans, joining the band for the recording of their 1983 debut album Filth and appearing on every album except the 1992 album Love of Life and the 1996 album Soundtracks for the Blind, though his playing is sampled throughout the latter record. Westberg became a full-time Swans member once again when Michael Gira reformed the group in 2010.

== Career ==
Norman Westberg was born in Detroit, United States. He moved to New York City in 1980. He has older sisters and a brother, who turned him on to music. Initially, Westberg was interested in playing drums, but "something about the guitar overshadowed that". Before joining Swans, Westberg started a band with a friend from a punk rock club, "Bookies", and was a member of Carnival Crash.

Westberg became a member of Swans after meeting the band's bass guitarist Harry Crosby at a house party, where Westberg was playing with his band Carnival Crash. Crosby asked Westberg if he wanted to audition for his band, and Westberg agreed, passing the audition.

In 2016, Swans announced a change of the lineup, and Westberg was one of the people who left the band's consistent lineup, but continued collaborating with Swans. In February 2019, Swans recorded a new album later released as Leaving Meaning. Westberg played on "a couple of songs", including "Hums". Westberg played guitar on "Ebbing" from 2023 Swans album The Beggar, and would return to full member status on the band's next album Birthing.

=== Solo and collaborations ===
Westberg's guitar can be heard on many Swans side projects including The Body Haters and appeared on several solo albums by Jarboe. Westberg was for a short-time a member of The Heroine Sheiks with Shannon Selberg (ex-The Cows) as well as John Fell (ex-China Shop). Aside from the present incarnation of Swans he has been playing in the NYC bands NeVAh (with Vinnie Signorelli & Algis Kizys) and Five Dollar Priest (formerly Size Queens) (with Ron Ward of Speedball Baby & Bob Bert among others). He also contributed to the Crisis albums Deathshead Extermination (1996) and The Hollowing (1997). Westberg also appeared (credited as Norman Westburg) in a short film The Right Side of My Brain (1985) directed by Richard Kern and starring Lydia Lunch.

Westberg made his first solo guitar performance in the 90s at The Cooler, but Westberg didn't like the way he played. Before he returned to solo recording, Westberg has been figuring out a way that would be enjoyable to him. He started "plugging all of his effects boxes into all of his tiny amps and let the guitar do what it wanted, only manipulating the boxes".

In 2011, Westberg made a recording for his father-in-law, a saxophone player in the Navy’s band and music teacher. Jennifer, Westberg's spouse, heard the recording and encouraged him to sell them as limited edition custom made CDs. On February 25, 2012, Westberg released the recordings as two albums: Plough and Limited Edition of 75. Plough is a four-track EP recorded from 2006 to 2009 and features Westberg coupling guitar with banjo and DX drum machine. Limited Edition of 75, a one fifteen-minute-long ambient piece, pressed onto a disc decorated with an MRI pattern taken from the CD with Westberg's MRI scan. Both CD-Rs are packaged in handmade sleeves: Plough with a signed inner and Limited Edition of 75 signed and numbered on the disk itself.

In February 2014 Westberg released a third limited edition solo CD entitled 13, which was then reissued through the ROOM40 record label on November 13, 2015.

In 2014, Westberg joined with Mark Shippy (U.S. Maple), Jim Sykes (Invisible Things), Matthew Wascovich (Scarcity Of Tanks), and Mike Watt (Minutemen) to form the art rock project band Hidden Rifles. Their debut album, Across The Neighborhoods, was released in October 2017.

== Personal life ==
In 2006, Norman Westberg married Jennifer Tull Westberg. Jennifer is a jeweler, and created the rings for their wedding. They have a daughter, Wilhelmina Opal Westberg, born on November 11th, 2009.

== Influences ==
Asked about influences on his guitar playing in a 2019 interview, Westberg cited various 1970s "blues based" guitarists, namely Mick Ronson, Jimi Hendrix, Steve Hunter, Dick Wagner, J. Geils, Ritchie Blackmore, Tony Iommi, Ron Asheton and James Williamson; and subsequent early alternative rock guitarists Andy Gill, Rowland S. Howard, Stevie Shears, Keith Levene, Tom Verlaine, and Richard Lloyd.

== Discography ==
=== Solo ===
Year	Title
2012	Plough
2014	Jasper Sits Out
2014	13
2015	Idling Live
2016	Not October
2016	MRI
2016	The All Most Quiet
2017	somewhere else
2017	The Chance To
2018	After Vacation (with Lawrence English)
2019	Bedroom Off
2021	First Man In The Moon (with Jacek Mazurkiewicz)
2021	Is It Safe Yet?
2022	Drag Acid #8
2023	Aftermath (with Luna Honey)

=== Swans ===
Year	Title
1983	Filth
1984	Cop
1986	Greed
1986	Holy Money
1987	Children of God
1989	The Burning World
1991	White Light from the Mouth of Infinity
1995	The Great Annihilator
2010	My Father Will Guide Me up a Rope to the Sky
2012	The Seer
2014	To Be Kind
2016	The Glowing Man
2019	Leaving Meaning
2025	Birthing

=== The Heroine Sheiks ===
Year	Title
2000	Rape on the Installment Plan
2002	Siamese Pipe

=== Other ===
Year	Title
1986	Dirtdish (Wiseblood)
1998	Delirium Tremens (Sulfur)
