= List of The Venture Bros. episodes =

The Venture Bros. ran for seven seasons. The first three seasons consisted of 13 thirty-minute episodes (including time for commercials), plus the pilot episode and one 15-minute Christmas special. The fourth season consisted of 16 thirty-minute episodes and one hour-long season finale episode, while the fifth season had an hour-long premiere, a thirty-minute Halloween special and 8 thirty-minute episodes.

During the first three seasons, Adult Swim originally broadcast several episodes out of narrative order. The DVD releases presented the episodes in the order intended by Jackson Publick and Doc Hammer. Beginning with season four, the network had debuted new episodes in the correct order. An hour-long special titled "All This and Gargantua-2" aired January 19, 2015, as a precursor to season 6, although the Adult Swim website's video on demand section considered the episode to be the first episode of season 6. In January 31, 2016 the sixth season, consisting of eight episodes, began airing and being made available on various digital platforms on consecutive Sunday evenings. The seventh and final season, consisting of 10 episodes, began airing on August 5, 2018.

The Venture Bros is rated TV-14 to TV-MA, primarily due to frequently including varying degrees of suggestive dialogue and themes throughout, as well as some animated violence, nudity and language. (The latter two of which are uncensored on home video releases from season 3 onwards.)

A direct-to-video film, The Venture Bros.: Radiant Is the Blood of the Baboon Heart, released on digital platforms on July 21, 2023, acting as a finale to the series.

== Series overview ==
Season	Episodes		Originally released		
Season	Episodes		First released	Last released	Network
Pilot			February 16, 2003		Adult Swim
1	13		August 7, 2004	October 30, 2004	Adult Swim
Special			December 19, 2004		Adult Swim
2	13		June 25, 2006	October 15, 2006	Adult Swim
3	13		June 1, 2008	August 24, 2008	Adult Swim
4	16	8	October 18, 2009	December 13, 2009	Adult Swim
4	16	8	September 12, 2010	November 21, 2010	Adult Swim
Special			August 28, 2011		Adult Swim
Special			October 28, 2012		Adult Swim
5	8		June 2, 2013	July 21, 2013	Adult Swim
Special			January 19, 2015		Adult Swim
6	8		January 31, 2016	March 20, 2016	Adult Swim
7	10		August 5, 2018	October 7, 2018	Adult Swim
Film			July 21, 2023		Adult Swim

== Episodes ==
This article lists the episodes in their DVD release order, rather than by their original air dates, because the original air dates severely differed from intended order during the first season.

=== Pilot (2003) ===
Title	Written by	Original release date	Prod. code
"The Terrible Secret of Turtle Bay"	Jackson Publick	February 16, 2003	0-01
Scientist and former boy adventurer Thaddeus "Rusty" Venture, his twin sons Hank and Dean, and his dangerous Office of Secret Intelligence (O.S.I.) bodyguard Brock Samson live on his deceased father Jonas's compound, and are frequently attacked by butterfly-themed supervillain The Monarch. The family travels to the United Nations so Rusty can present his new invention, where the boys encounter The Monarch, fleeing from him and almost consorting with a prostitute. Brock tracks down The Monarch under the assumption that he has done something to the boys. Rusty's invention turns out to be a death ray, which the UN rejects but the army buys. A Japanese businessman that has been trying to steal the ray is found masturbating with it, having a fetish for advanced technology rather than trying to steal it. Post-credits scene: A hospitalized Monarch has his costume's wings removed from his stomach.

=== Season 1 (2004) ===
No. overall	No. in season	Title	Written by	Original release date	Prod. code
1	1	"Dia de los Dangerous!"	Jackson Publick	August 7, 2004	1-01
While Rusty tries to buy drugs in Tijuana from a doctor, The Monarch's henchmen kidnap the boys and barely manage to incapacitate Brock, burying him out in the desert. The doctor takes Rusty's kidneys and he calls his Humanoid Electronic Lab Partner Robot (H.E.L.P.eR.) to take him back to his jet, the X-1, where he converts him into a dialysis machine. He finds Brock's grave, only for him to burst out of it and take Rusty to rescue the boys. The Monarch, feeling guilt over how little Rusty seems to care for them, explains why he wants to help them to his girlfriend, Dr. Girlfriend: as a child, he was orphaned in a plane crash and raised by a swarm of monarch butterflies, and wants to give the boys that same care. Brock drives his car through The Monarch's "Cocoon" fortress and massacres his men, while Rusty rescues the boys and has them play rock paper scissors to decide who gives up their kidney for him. Post-credits scene: The boys wake up to find that Rusty has taken a kidney each from them.
2	2	"Careers in Science"	Story by : Ben Edlund & Doc Hammer; Teleplay by : Doc Hammer	August 14, 2004	1-02
Rusty is summoned to Jonas's space station, Gargantua-1, to investigate the station's "PROBLEM" light turning on. Brock and H.E.L.P.eR. are sucked into space when Rusty accidentally opens the bay doors, but Brock survives and has sex with captain Bud Manstrong's love interest. Manstrong scares the boys with a story about a crew member who went insane and sent the previous crew of the station into space during a movie night, and they mistake a returned H.E.L.P.eR. for the crew member's spirit and launch him back outside. Brock and Manstrong go to repair the hole that H.E.L.P.eR.'s return left in the station and Brock beats Manstrong up when he confronts him. Rusty discovers that a toy he left in the station's circuitry as a child melted and removes it, turning the light off. As the Ventures leave the station, the light turns back on. Post-credits scene: H.E.L.P.eR. crashes in the Ventures's front yard.
3	3	"Mid-life Chrysalis"	Jackson Publick & Doc Hammer	September 25, 2004	1-03
After the X-1 is pulled over by the military, Brock learns that his O.S.I. license is expired. The boys help him study and train for the exam, and despite him completely ignoring the rules, he passes and kills a bartender who mocked him when he was unlicensed. Rusty, insecure after one of the soldiers mocks his age, tries to find a date. A disguised Dr. Girlfriend seduces him and injects him with a serum that turns him into a giant caterpillar. As Rusty begins to cocoon himself, a guilty Dr. Girlfriend returns and injects him again with a serum that turns him back to normal. Post-credits scene: Rusty emerges from the cocoon as himself again.
4	4	"Eeney, Meeney, Miney... Magic!"	Doc Hammer	September 4, 2004	1-04
Necromancer Byron Orpheus becomes the compound's new tenant, and Dean is instantly smitten with his daughter Triana. Brock rescues Hank from being lured into Rusty's new invention, a machine that shows those inside it their greatest pleasures, but is pulled in. The boys cover their heads and follow him in, protecting them from its visions but locking them in with him. Orpheus senses dark power coming from the machine and Rusty admits he is powering it with an orphan's heart. Orpheus fails to get it open until Triana enters, and her saying Dean's name allows him to open the door. Orpheus vanishes the machine to prevent it from trapping anyone else. Post-credits scene: Rusty tries to get Dean out of the bathroom until Dean explains he is "practicing being a boyfriend," prompting Rusty to leave immediately.
5	5	"The Incredible Mr. Brisby"	Jackson Publick	August 28, 2004	1-05
The Ventures go to Brisbyland so Rusty can meet with quadriplegic entertainment mogul Roy Brisby. Brisby asks Rusty to clone him, and has his pet panda that he took from David Bowie knock Rusty out when he refuses. He drugs Brock, who is rescued by his longtime adversary and love interest, mercenary Molotov Cocktease. They fight and almost have sex, but he is disheartened to learn that she is still wearing a chastity belt. The boys are kidnapped from the X-1 by a revolutionary group fighting Brisby's empire and mind-controlled to hate him. Brisby shows Rusty his plans to take over the world with his influence, only for the revolutionaries to attack him just as Brock and Cocktease arrive, who goes off on her own to complete her mission. Brock frees the boys and rescues Rusty. Post-credits scene: Cocktease is revealed to have taken the panda and calls Bowie to report the job as complete.
6	6	"Tag-Sale – You're It!"	Doc Hammer	October 9, 2004	1-06
Rusty holds a yard sale at the Venture compound, which The Monarch and Dr. Girlfriend attend. While he looks for a bathroom, she is accosted by Phantom Limb, an old associate of hers with invisible and electrical arms and legs. He tries to convince her to leave The Monarch and she turns him down, but has visible doubts. The Monarch starts a fight so he can sneak into the house and use the bathroom, and once inside, he finds that Rusty's life is too mundane and depressing to make any worse. Before Dr. Girlfriend can voice her concerns, they are attacked by O.S.I. guards, who The Monarch kills before declaring his determination to hate Rusty and escaping with a rejuvenated Dr. Girlfriend. Post-credits scene: The Monarch is revealed to have "escaped" by hanging on the ceiling with a grappling hook, and he and Dr. Girlfriend wait for hours until the sale is over to leave undetected.
7	7	"Home Insecurity"	Jackson Publick	August 21, 2004	1-07
Brock leaves on a camping trip into military-guarded woods, where he runs into a bionic former soldier and his lover, Sasquatch. To protect them, Brock shaves Sasquatch and passes them off to guards as military friends. H.E.L.P.eR. discovers that Rusty is building a new defense robot and leaves the compound, hurt. Both The Monarch's and villain Baron Werner Ünderbheit's henchmen attack Rusty at the same time, causing the compound to lock them outside and send him and the boys to the panic room. They are attacked by the defense robot and he is forced to call and apologize to H.E.L.P.eR., who reboots the compound's system and causes the robot to massacre the now allied henchmen. The Monarch and Ünderbheit have a lengthy debate over who gets to attack Rusty, eventually agreeing to team up without realizing their men are dead. Post-credits scene: H.E.L.P.eR. keeps Rusty trapped in the panic room out of spite.
8	8	"Ghosts of the Sargasso"	Jackson Publick & Doc Hammer	September 11, 2004	1-08
Rusty takes his hydrofoil, the X-2, out to the Bermuda Triangle to find Jonas's long-sunken experimental plane, hoping to salvage and sell it. He dives into the water, but his tracking device awakens the spirit of the plane's dead pilot. The X-2 is attacked by pirates looking to steal it, and they capture Brock, who quickly escapes. Dean finds himself getting along with the pirates' captain, while Hank encounters the spirit and calls Orpheus. He puts them in touch with the spirit's widow, who tries to calm it down until Brock gets back on the X-2, beats up the spirit, and throws it into the ocean. Post-credits scene: The captain apologizes to Brock and asks for a ride home.
9	9	"Ice Station Impossible"	Jackson Publick	September 18, 2004	1-09
Rusty applies for a job under scientist Richard Impossible, who has the ability to stretch his limbs. When he requests a urine sample from Rusty, his wife Sally discreetly offers to give him a clean one and tries to seduce him, only for him to learn that her skin turns invisible. She reveals that she and Impossible gained their powers because of his experiments, as well as her brother, who bursts into flames whenever his skin touches oxygen, and her intellectually disabled cousin, whose skin is several inches thick. Impossible leaves Rusty out in the Arctic to die for discovering his secret. An O.S.I. agent dies on the Venture compound while rescuing a vial of a serum created by Impossible, which gets on Hank. Brock learns that he will soon explode if not cured and takes him to Impossible, rescuing Rusty along the way. Impossible concludes that the serum doesn't work on humans, and Sally tries to leave with Rusty, but he leaves her behind, disgusted by her condition. Post-credits scene: Impossible tests Sally's urine sample, believing it to be Rusty's, and to Sally's horror concludes that Rusty is pregnant.
10	10	"Are You There God, It's Me, Dean"	Doc Hammer	October 2, 2004	1–10
Before The Monarch can torture the Ventures, Dean begs him to stop because of the sudden pain he feels in his genitals. Rusty cites a law of the Guild of Calamitous Intent, the villain organization The Monarch is licensed under, that forces him to halt the torture temporarily. Rusty brings Dean to his albino college friend Pete White and Pete's scientist roommate Billy "Quizboy" Whalen. Billy discovers that Dean is suffering from testicular torsion and fixes it. Meanwhile, The Monarch takes Hank and Brock as collateral. Brock observes that The Monarch has nothing to do other than go after Rusty, and decides to start a fight with his men out of pity. Before the fight can reach its climax, Rusty calls to inform them that Dean is healed. The Monarch prepares to torture the Ventures again, only for Hank to ask him to stop, now suffering from torsion himself. Post-credits scene: The Ventures star in a public service announcement about testicular torsion.
11	11	"Past Tense"	Jackson Publick	October 16, 2004	1–12
The Ventures attend the funeral of Rusty's old friend Mike Sorayama. His mechanical coffin is rigged to kidnap Brock, Pete, Rusty, and Ünderbheit, all of whom he knew in college. Having faked his death, Sorayama explains that all of them hurt his chances of asking out his crush in one way or another, and Brock escapes using Ünderbheit's metal jaw. The boys call Jonas's old friends, Team Venture, for help, including the suave Colonel Gentleman, the violent Action Man, and the super-strong Kano. Team Venture locates Sorayama, destroying and disguising themselves as his robots, only for Brock to beat them up, accidentally dispatching Sorayama in the process. The Ventures discover that Sorayama is actually a robot and the real Sorayama is dead, leaving and forgetting Pete and Ünderbheit. Post-credits scene: In a flashback, Brock, Rusty's college roommate, leaves school to join the army and informs him of Jonas's death.
12	12	"The Trial of the Monarch"	Doc Hammer	October 23, 2004	1–13
The Monarch is put on trial for killing a police officer. In his testimony, a henchman publishes an embarrassing biography of him that delves into Dr. Girlfriend's past. Enraged that she used to work for several male, higher-ranking villains, he kicks her out. Dr. Girlfriend testifies that she went back to Phantom Limb and a drunken Monarch stormed over to his house. Orpheus is called to the stand to read The Monarch's mind, revealing that, while urinating on Phantom Limb's lawn, he was caught by the officer. The Guild drugged The Monarch and paid the officer to fake his death. Before Orpheus can reveal this, Guild agents freeze everyone in the room, the entire situation revealed to be a sting to capture the attorney opposing The Monarch. Phantom Limb hypnotizes Orpheus to implicate The Monarch, while Dr. Girlfriend hypnotizes The Monarch to believe she was not involved. Post-credits scene: Now in prison, The Monarch forgives a visiting Dr. Girlfriend, actually sardonic henchman 24 in her clothes and a wig, who asks to leave.
13	13	"Return to Spider-Skull Island"	Jackson Publick & Doc Hammer	October 30, 2004	1–11
Rusty is hospitalized after his stomach bulges, scaring the boys, who believe he is pregnant, into running away. A tumor is removed from his stomach, but it comes to life, runs off, and steals the X-1. Upon returning to the compound, Rusty is attacked by the tumor, actually a man with Jonas's face in a mechanical suit made from household items, who reveals himself to be Rusty's twin that he ate in the womb. Brock knocks the tumor out of his suit, but Rusty begs Brock to spare him. The tumor names himself Jonas Jr. or "J.J.", and Rusty gives him the X-2 and the family compound on Spider-Skull Island as restitution. The boys are arrested after speeding on their hover scooters. Orpheus informs Rusty of their predicament, who bails them out and makes them ride their scooters in front of the car. 24 and his best friend 21 spot the boys while driving, accidentally shooting and killing them. Post-credits scene: Rusty stares at the boys' bodies and tells Brock to "get their clothes."

=== Special (2004) ===
Title	Written by	Original release date	Prod. code
"A Very Venture Christmas"	Jackson Publick	December 19, 2004	S1
On Christmas, The Monarch rigs Rusty's nativity scene to explode when the baby Jesus is put in its manger. At the compound's Christmas party, Dean, eager for a good story, reads from one of Orpheus's books but accidentally summons the Krampus. Brock fights it until the clock strikes midnight and the Krampus moves to leave, not before putting the figurine in its manger, causing the compound to explode. The episode's events are revealed to be Rusty's dream, having been knocked out after the X-1 crashed in Bethlehem.

=== Season 2 (2006) ===
No. overall	No. in season	Title	Written by	Original release date	Prod. code
14	1	"Powerless in the Face of Death"	Jackson Publick & Doc Hammer	June 25, 2006	2–20
Rusty uses the deaths of the boys as an excuse to run away and avoid his responsibilities, only to be found and dragged back to the compound by Brock. J.J. has become more successful than him in his absence, having partially completed a teleporter that he asks him to finish. When Rusty unplugs it while standing inside, he accidentally splits his body into thirds and teleports them across the compound. Orpheus is shocked to learn that the boys have clone backups, having died many times, and Rusty explains that their "learning beds" that school them in their sleep are used to restore their brains. The imprisoned Monarch plots an escape, but the Guild catches wind of it and Phantom Limb bribes his accomplices to back out. When The Monarch is cornered by guards, accomplice King Gorilla is moved by his desperation to win Dr. Girlfriend back and helps him escape through the sewer line. Post-credits scene: The Monarch emerges outside the prison and finds the last third of Rusty's body.
15	2	"Hate Floats"	Jackson Publick & Doc Hammer	July 2, 2006	2–19
The Monarch calls his remaining henchmen, 21 and 24, and orders them to assemble a new team, which they source from a bad neighborhood. Rusty finishes restoring the boys' brains and they go to the mall. Dr. Girlfriend and Phantom Limb go to the same mall and The Monarch follows them. He tries to win Dr. Girlfriend back but gets distracted when 24 notices the Ventures, and she rejects him after realizing he cares more about his grudge than her. The henchmen kidnap Rusty and the new men overthrow the Monarch and lock him up with 21, 24, and Rusty. Dr. Girlfriend helps the boys steal Brock's car and has Hank drive her to the Cocoon, while Phantom Limb helps Brock break into the Cocoon, believing The Monarch took Dr. Girlfriend. Unaware that Phantom Limb and Brock have massacred the henchmen, the imprisoned group sneak into 21's old room and arm themselves with his collection of memorabilia, opening the door to fight their rescuers. Post-credits scene: Dr. Girlfriend confirms that the brutalized Monarch is still alive and convinces Phantom Limb not to kill him. Brock insults her and Phantom Limb tranquilizes him.
16	3	"Assassinanny 911"	Jackson Publick	July 9, 2006	2–16
Brock leaves on an O.S.I. mission and asks Cocktease to guard the Ventures. Disgusted at Brock's talents being wasted on his guard job, she vows to get the boys in shape, and Hank becomes infatuated with her. Her costume's self-defense mechanism injects him with a hallucinogen when he smells it and he convinces himself to kill Rusty, who is also attracted to Cocktease. He attacks and seemingly kills him. Brock is tasked with killing colonel Hunter Gathers, his now rogue mentor. He track Gathers down, finding that he has undergone a sex change operation. Unable to kill her, he leaves. Post-credits scene: Cocktease tries to convince Brock to leave with her, but he chooses to stay with the Ventures. Rusty explains to him that a hallucinating Hank attacked him with a fake sword, wet himself, and passed out.
17	4	"Escape to the House of Mummies Part II"	Doc Hammer	July 16, 2006	2–18
The episode opens with a recap of "Part One", where the Ventures cross paths with a time traveling Egyptian cult. "Part Two" opens with them in a room with spiked walls closing in, and Rusty reluctantly calls Orpheus to help them. He stops the walls and Rusty escapes, leaving the boys and Brock behind. They get access to the time machine, allying with historical figures and other versions of Hank and Brock. Rusty returns to the compound and refuses to thank Orpheus, believing he could have saved them with science. They bet on who can shrink an object smaller, and Rusty is forced to get Jonas's broken shrink ray from Pete and Billy. They test the ray on Billy, but it does not work properly. Unable to cast the spell properly, Orpheus consults his sarcastic mentor, The Master, who gets him to see that he is single and friendless because of his overdedication to his work. Rusty and Orpheus admit to each other that they failed. Post-credits scene: A teaser for "Part Three" is shown, where the Brocks cut open Edgar Allan Poe so Hank can be put inside him to avoid freezing to death.
18	5	"Twenty Years to Midnight"	Jackson Publick	August 6, 2006	2–17
As Brock discovers an old camera with a message from Jonas in it, an alien descends to Earth. Jonas explains that at midnight tomorrow, Rusty needs to assemble pieces of a machine to save the world. The Ventures travel to Spider-Skull Island so Rusty can steal the X-2 but are caught by J.J., who offers to help. The boys go to Colonel Gentleman's place in Tangier and find the machine piece, as well as his dead body. J.J. and the pirate captain, now his employee, find the second piece in a bathysphere inhabited by "Action" Johnny, a former boy adventurer turned addict. Brock and Rusty go to New York City to infiltrate Impossible Industries, where Rusty manipulates Sally into helping them. They are caught by Impossible, who has already captured the other two groups, but Sally saves them and Brock defeats him by tying him to a subway train. The assembled machine activates at midnight just as the alien catches up with them and Jonas steps through the machine to kill it, explaining that it was going to destroy the world. Rusty tries to talk to him, only for him to reveal that he is an alien using Jonas's face to hide his horrifying true form. Post-credits scene: J.J. introduces himself to an infatuated Sally, while Brock and Rusty stare at a stretched-out Impossible and wonder if they should help him.
19	6	"Victor. Echo. November."	Doc Hammer	August 13, 2006	2–15
Orpheus sets the boys up for dinner with Triana and her friend when Rusty asks him to watch them, while The Monarch goes to the same restaurant to discuss his Guild contract with Phantom Limb, who brings Dr. Girlfriend. When The Monarch mocks Phantom Limb's guild status as a bureaucrat, he orders the Ventures killed as a display of power. Brock kills the Guild agents invading the compound and goes to save the boys, who Phantom Limb notices in the bathroom and decides to kill. Brock intercepts him and threatens him into backing down. Phantom Limb apologizes, admitting he just wanted to impress Dr. Girlfriend. Post-credits scene: Rusty, his arm taken off by Guild agents, has it restored by Billy. He asks Billy, Phantom Limb's former assistant and the person rumored to be responsible for his condition, how he got his robotic hand, and Billy admits "I have no idea."
20	7	"Love-Bheits"	Jackson Publick	August 20, 2006	2–14
While flying back from a costume party, the Ventures fly over Ünderland, Ünderbheit's territory, who downs the X-1 and captures them. Believing Dean is a girl because of his Princess Leia costume, he decides to marry him. Brock, Rusty, and Hank are rescued by revolutionaries who have been fighting Ünderbheit by pranking him, and they decide to rescue Dean by themselves. Dean's royal tailors realize that he is male and contact the revolution. Just as Ünderbheit marries Dean, the revolutionaries arrive and point out that gay marriage is illegal in Ünderland, getting Ünderbheit exiled. Post-credits scene: Ünderbheit arrives at the Cocoon and asks if he can stay there.
21	8	"Fallen Arches"	Doc Hammer	September 3, 2006	2–22
Orpheus registers for a Guild archnemesis and is ordered to put a team together for his upcoming interview. He assembles his friends "blacula" hunter Jefferson Twilight and The Alchemist into the "Order of the Triad". Arch candidate Torrid kidnaps Triana, provoking Orpheus into fighting him and earning him his role as the Order's nemesis. The Monarch drops a prostitute into the bowels of the Cocoon to make her fight for her life after having her pretend to be Dr. Girlfriend. 21 forges archnemesis IDs and steals jetpacks to try and encourage 24 to work with him, but they are unable to get them to work. Post-credits scene: 24 tries to hitchhike back to the Cocoon with the escaped woman, but she speeds away when she notices his costume.
22	9	"Guess Who's Coming to State Dinner?"	Story by : Jackson Publick & Ben Edlund; Teleplay by : Jackson Publick	September 10, 2006	2–21
Gargantua-1 crashes, leaving Manstrong as the only survivor. He is regarded as a national hero and invited to dinner at the White House, which the Ventures also attend. The ghost of Abraham Lincoln informs the boys that he noticed a device on Manstrong's neck and suspects his mother is controlling him to kill the president. As Manstrong and his mother talk to the president in the Oval Office, Rusty breaks in so he can pitch his force field. The remote breaks when a secret service agent tackles him, trapping everyone in the office. Lincoln realizes he can move through things that bear his image and has the boys make a suit out of five dollar bills. Manstrong attacks Brock when he believes he is trying to have sex with his mother just as Lincoln breaks through the force field, and Rusty realizes the device is actually a piece of Gargantua-1's motherboard, which removes Manstrong's sexual inhibitions when taken off. Post-credits scene: Rusty mocks Manstrong until Lincoln points out that Rusty also masturbated in the White House when he was a boy.
23	10	"I Know Why the Caged Bird Kills"	Jackson Publick & Doc Hammer	September 24, 2006	2–23
Rusty returns from a trip to Japan being followed by an oni. The boys are kidnapped by Myra Standish, a woman who claims to be Rusty's former bodyguard and the boys' mother. She happens across Rusty and kidnaps him as well, forcing Brock to rescue them. Kindly villain advisor Dr. Henry Killinger accosts The Monarch and takes over and improves the Cocoon, convincing 24 to side with him. 21 goes to Dr. Girlfriend for help, who fights her way to The Monarch, only for Killinger to reveal he set things up so they could make amends. Post-credits scene: Killinger summons the oni, planted by him to reunite Myra and Rusty, and commends it for at least indirectly helping the boys to be rescued.
24	11	"¡Viva los Muertos!"	Ben Edlund	October 1, 2006	2–24
Brock kills a new Monarch henchman during a raid on the compound and is unable to shake his guilt over the idea that the man could have turned his life around. He goes to an Order ceremony and has an epiphany about his work that reinvigorates him. Rusty rebuilds the dead henchman as "Venturestein", a low-functioning monster he tries to sell to the military. A psychotic gang of detectives stumble onto the compound and come across the boys, who they had killed before and are unaware of their clones. They chase the boys into the room that houses the clones, where Brock and Venturestein rescue them. Rusty passes off the clones as Christmas gifts to calm the boys. Post-credits scene: Brock takes Venturestein to find a woman to have sex with as an apology for killing him.
25	12	"Showdown at Cremation Creek" (Parts I and II)	Jackson Publick & Doc Hammer	October 8, 2006	2–25; 2–26
26	13	"Showdown at Cremation Creek" (Parts I and II)	Jackson Publick & Doc Hammer	October 15, 2006	2–25; 2–26
The Monarch proposes to Dr. Girlfriend, having been seeing her behind Phantom Limb's back. She agrees on the condition that he no longer pursues Rusty, but his henchmen kidnap the Ventures as a gift on the day of the wedding. He convinces Dr. Girlfriend that he brought the Ventures to the Cocoon as guests. An annoyed 24 sends Dean away, and he winds up in the Cocoon's engine room. Dr. Girlfriend is walked down the aisle by David Bowie. Before the couple can be wed, Phantom Limb surrounds the Cocoon with his henchmen despite being denied retaliation by Guild leader The Sovereign, and orders Dr. Girlfriend returned to him. Bowie's treacherous men, Iggy Pop and Klaus Nomi, incapacitate him and take Dr. Girlfriend, while Brock takes command of the henchmen and organizes them to fight Phantom Limb's forces. Phantom Limb reveals to Dr. Girlfriend that The Sovereign was Bowie, making him the new Sovereign. Pop accidentally frees Bowie, who kills him and Nomi before dueling Phantom Limb. The Order, summoned after Orpheus sensed the Ventures were in trouble, crash the X-1 into the Cocoon's engine room, where Dean is hallucinating a fantasy adventure because of the fumes. Rusty and The Monarch eject themselves from the downed Cocoon, colliding with Phantom Limb's ship, who escapes after losing an arm and leg in the crash. Post-credits scene: Dean rides home on top of the X-1 to stave off the rest of his mania, while Dr. Girlfriend admits something unheard to The Monarch that shocks him.

=== Season 3 (2008) ===
No. overall	No. in season	Title	Written by	Original release date	Prod. code
27	1	"Shadowman 9: In the Cradle of Destiny"	Jackson Publick & Doc Hammer	June 1, 2008	3–32
Dr. Girlfriend and The Monarch are separately grilled by the Guild's Council of Thirteen, who are putting The Monarch on trial for improper arching. Flashbacks reveal that he was originally a Phantom Limb henchman and arched Rusty in secret, where he met Dr. Girlfriend. He dressed as The Monarch at a party specifically to woo her, earning Phantom Limb's contempt and convincing the Council of his innocence in the present. They reveal that the entire ordeal was a test to certify Dr. Girlfriend and The Monarch's official dual villain status under the Guild. The Monarch's henchmen are taken over by Dr. Girlfriend's henchmen, the two "moppets," who order them to rebuild the Cocoon. 21 and 24 contact Brock to try and have him kill them, but he instead helps rebuild the Cocoon just as the Guild arrives to assist them. The moppets stab 24 when he dumps a cooler of Gatorade on them, and The Monarch and Dr. Girlfriend, now Dr. Mrs. The Monarch, move into Phantom Limb's old house. Post-credits scene: Phantom Limb tracks down and kills a villain The Monarch pretended to be while seducing Dr. Girlfriend. Note: This is the first episode produced in 16:9 High Definition.
28	2	"The Doctor Is Sin"	Jackson Publick	June 8, 2008	3–28
As Rusty's finances turn dire and he refuses to accept another loan from J.J., he is approached by Killinger, who turns the compound around and forces Rusty to confront his fear of success that stems from Jonas and his childhood. Despite how well liked Killinger is by the Ventures, Orpheus is unsettled by him and becomes determined to beat him when Killinger evicts him. He convinces Brock and The Alchemist to help him. Killinger reveals to Rusty that he has been grooming him to be a Guild supervillain that arches J.J., and Orpheus and friends break in to find Rusty signing Killinger's severance agreement. Post-credits scene: Rusty goes through his long-unopened mail and finds a deadly but deceased cobra from The Monarch.
29	3	"Home Is Where the Hate Is"	Jackson Publick & Doc Hammer	June 22, 2008	3–37
Rusty's new arch, recovering pedophile Sergeant Hatred, throws a party to celebrate his new job and invites him. The Monarch steals one of Hatred's explosive devices and plants it on Rusty, while Hatred reveals that he intentionally arched Rusty because The Monarch had his henchmen steal Hatred's technology. Rusty joins them in conversation as the bomb comes close to going off, only for the ineffective device to create a minuscule explosion. 21 explains 24's stabbing to Hank and asks for help getting rid of the moppets, only for them to notice the two trying to sneak up on them and giving chase, assuming Hank is 24 out of costume. 21, 24 and the boys flee from the moppets, distracting them by putting 21 and 24's costumes on dummies. Post-credits scene: As the Ventures leave, Hatred tries to invite the boys to stay over with him.
30	4	"The Invisible Hand of Fate"	Jackson Publick	June 15, 2008	3–27
Billy hits his head, causing him to remember his past, but Pete knocks him out before he can do anything. Flashbacks reveal that Billy was a disgraced game show contestant after Pete, the host of a show he was colluding with, cheats for him. After Rusty rejects them when they asked for a job, Pete accidentally enlists Billy in a dogfight that lost him his eye and hand. He abandons Pete and is found by Gathers and Brock, who equip him with his robot hand and have him go undercover at Phantom Limb's college. Phantom Limb makes him his research assistant and reveals that his limbs are shriveled, making him a laughingstock amongst his family, and he has built a machine with help from the Guild to grow them. It explodes during a test, regrowing his limbs but also vanishing them. Brock is reassigned to guard Rusty by a Guild agent posing as O.S.I., and he brings Billy back to Pete after wiping his memory. Post-credits scene: In the present, Billy wakes up in the Venture compound, remembering everything, and attacks Brock.
31	5	"The Buddy System"	Doc Hammer	June 29, 2008	3–30
Rusty hosts a camp for aspiring scientists at the compound, where Hank befriends petulant teenager Dermott Fictel, who aggravates Brock. The Monarch sends the disguised moppets to spy on Rusty, but Brock identifies them and kicks them out after failing to get them to beat up Dermott. Rusty takes the tour group into an abandoned building, only to be attacked by a rabid gorilla inside, which kills one of the children before he can lock it in. Dean beats up Dermott when he mocks him in front of Triana. Hatred arrives after mixing up his arching schedule and helps Rusty make the rest of the day fun for the children. As the kids leave, Rusty gives a hastily made clone of the dead boy to his parents. Dermott is picked up by his mother, who asks if he met "him." Dermott asks "you sure he's my real father?" Post-credits scene: Dr. Mrs. The Monarch hugs the moppets for their good work in her revealing new costume, which they both enjoy.
32	6	"Dr. Quymn, Medicine Woman"	Jackson Publick	July 6, 2008	3–31
While training an orangutan to box so it can be sold on the black market, Rusty encounters his childhood friend, adventurer Tara Quymn, as well as her unstable bodyguard Ginnie and her twin daughters. Both Rusty and Ginnie are infatuated with Quymn, while the twins are interested in Dean. They get word from natives of a "wereodile" stalking the jungle at night, making Dean paranoid that one of the Quymns could be the monster. As Rusty and Quymn prepare to have sex and the twins drug Dean and do the same, Ginnie catches the former and starts beating Rusty up. As Ginnie and Brock fight, the epileptic Quymn has a seizure, and Dean, believing her to be the wereodile, starts hitting her. Hank is attacked by the wereodile, but it is beaten up by the orangutan. The next day, the twins lose interest in Dean after learning he is uncircumcised and the Quymns leave in disgust. Post-credits scene: The "wereodile" is revealed to be a native in a costume trying to get the Ventures and Quymns to leave. He argues with his fellow native wereodile about not showing up to help him.
33	7	"What Goes Down, Must Come Up"	Jackson Publick	July 13, 2008	3–33
Rusty falls into the compound's bunker, and when Brock follows him, he gets stuck in a room with the minuscule Paul Entmann, a former friend of Jonas's that has been trapped in the room for thirty years by the hostile artificial intelligence M.U.T.H.E.R.. Rusty encounters a group of sycophants who worship recordings Jonas left for Rusty in case of an apocalypse. When Pete and the Order try to investigate, M.U.T.H.E.R. demands to talk to Jonas or else she will launch a nuclear missile hidden under the compound. Entmann explains that the kids were being given a tour of the bunker with Team Venture when M.U.T.H.E.R. went haywire and tried to seal them all inside, resulting in him being trapped in the room and the kids to be stuck in the bunker. Rusty flees from the now-adult kids and clings to the top of the launching missile, only for it to malfunction due to them using it as a toilet. Post-credits scene: Rusty seals the bunker. To satiate M.U.T.H.E.R., Brock and Entmann play one of Jonas's recordings on a loop for her.
34	8	"Tears of a Sea Cow"	Doc Hammer	July 20, 2008	3–34
After The Monarch kills his new arch, mutant Dr. Dugong, he and Dr. Mrs. The Monarch argue about his henchmen's lack of things to do and his inability to arch anyone but Rusty. After learning that Rusty and Brock are out, The Monarch takes 21 and 24 to invade the compound. Hank, Dermott and H.E.L.P.eR. are trying to start a band, and Dean is annoyed by H.E.L.P.eR.'s inability to stop making noise. He shuts off H.E.L.P.eR.'s system, deactivating the compound's defenses and allowing The Monarch to infiltrate the compound. 21 informs Hank that he has seen him die multiple times and tries to prove his point by shooting him, unaware that his rifle shoots tranquilizers. Dean finds The Monarch defiling one of Rusty's robots, who manipulates him into not telling Rusty. Dr. Mrs. The Monarch is forced to mobilize the henchmen to go pick up The Monarch, and Hank wakes up with the impression that he is immortal. Post-credits scene: Dr. Mrs. The Monarch surprises The Monarch with his new arch: J.J..
35	9	"Now Museum, Now You Don't"	Jackson Publick	July 27, 2008	3–35
In 1969, Team Venture seizes Spider-Skull Island from its villainous owner. He sets it to self-destruct, only for the bomb to malfunction before it can explode. In the present, Rusty is invited by J.J. to the island's opening of the Jonas Venture Museum, where he is irritated with his lack of presence despite his importance in Jonas's life. Sally, now Jonas's girlfriend, is annoyed to see a depressed Impossible also present. One of the old villains uses his psychic powers to upset the pirate captain, who revolts with his friends against J.J.'s poor treatment of them. Team Venture (along with Colonel Gentleman, who was actually in a diabetic coma) fights back, and the chaos is stopped when J.J.'s memorial film for Jonas starts playing. J.J. invites Rusty to speak, but he has already left. The villain tries to reconnect to his robot, one of the museum's exhibits, but instead causes the bomb to restart its countdown. Post-credits scene: Impossible is revealed to have swallowed the explosion with his elastic body to save everyone, and Sally and J.J. thank him. The captain asks him if he was actually trying to kill himself rather than save them.
36	10	"The Lepidopterists"	Doc Hammer	August 3, 2008	3–36
The Monarch launches an attack on Spider-Skull Island, but the Cocoon is damaged by J.J.'s giant "Ventronic" robot. While The Monarch realizes that, through Guild law, he can attack Rusty as revenge as long as he survives the fight, J.J. calls the O.S.I., who sends agents Cardholder and Doe, as well as Brock. Cardholder and Doe drug the captain, which gets him addicted to tranquilizer. They authorize The Monarch's death because of him repeatedly killing his arches, and J.J. decides to use the island's death ray. The Monarch sends 21, 24, and the hyper-competent henchman 1 to the island to perform subterfuge, where he successfully sabotages the island's wiring. While the Cocoon speeds towards the island, J.J. prepares to fire the death ray and 1 trips the alarm system, causing Brock to attack him. J.J. fires just as The Monarch closes in. Post-credits scene: 21 and 24, sitting on the island's dock, receive a call from The Monarch, who reveals that their infiltration was so they could hack the island's video feed and make it appear that the Cocoon was coming at the island. He declares that they are going to attack Rusty.
37	11	"ORB"	Doc Hammer	August 10, 2008	3–29
Billy decodes a message hidden in Rusty's old cartoon and it leads him to a spot on the compound. He digs up a phonograph cylinder meant for "the Venture bodyguard," as well as another code. He and Rusty conclude they are supposed to go to Studio 54, while Brock listens to the cylinder and learns from Rusty's great-grandfather Lloyd's bodyguard, Sandow, that the Guild used to be a righteous organization that fell apart when they fought over their source of power, an orb-shaped device. He learns from Gathers that he is to kill Rusty if he tries to use the orb and tracks a signal to Kano's apartment, who reveals that he has a second cylinder. They listen to it and discover that Sandow killed Lloyd when he tried to use the orb, while The Alchemist properly decodes the new messages and tells Rusty and Billy to go to the Frick Collection. They discover the orb, but before Brock can ambush them, Rusty declares intent to study it and only use its abilities for good. Brock decides not to kill him and leaves. Post-credits scene: Rusty stores the orb in a safe in his study, while Brock is attacked by his car.
38	12	"The Family That Slays Together, Stays Together" (Parts One and Two)	Jackson Publick & Doc Hammer	August 17, 2008	3–38; 3-39
39	13	"The Family That Slays Together, Stays Together" (Parts One and Two)	Jackson Publick & Doc Hammer	August 24, 2008	3–38; 3-39
Brock dismantles his car and realizes the O.S.I. is after him for not killing Rusty. As he and the Ventures flee, The Monarch arrives to find the compound empty. He discovers Hatred in the bathroom, depressed over his wife leaving him and demanding Rusty kill him. Dr. Mrs. The Monarch manipulates H.E.L.P.eR. into giving her Rusty's location. Cocktease and Gathers confirm to Brock that three assassins have been sent to kill him, and the first one attacks. He boards the X-1 to escape, but the ejector pod lands on top of the assassin after he shoots out one of its engines. Brock goes to Shore Leave, a former O.S.I. agent, for assistance, and is attacked by the second assassin, who drags him into the ocean and tries to get him eaten by sharks. Brock tricks him into decapitating himself on a shark's teeth. The Ventures lay low in a motel, only for Brock to realize they are rooming across from the third assassin. He nearly kills Brock, but Hank distracts him long enough to make him impale himself on his own sword. As Brock orders Hank to call "The Cleaner", the police arrive to arrest the Ventures, only for them to be freed by The Cleaner. The Monarch and O.S.I. general Timothy Treister locate them at the same time. Brock convinces them to come to the compound independent of each other. O.S.I. forces and Monarch henchmen attack each other, while 21 and 24 hide in The Monarch's car. H.E.L.P.eR., equipped by The Monarch with a bomb, gets in the car and drives off with 24 still inside. Hatred commands the boys' clones into the battle, halting it, only for The Monarch to emerge in a new, untested suit that destroys the clones and immediately crashes. Treister reveals to Brock that the O.S.I. only came to help him after he was attacked by the assassins, and a disillusioned Brock decides to quit. He goes to take The Monarch's car, only for H.E.L.P.eR. to explode, killing 24. Post-credits scene: Cocktease and her squadron of female assassins, including Gathers, celebrate the other top assassins being eliminated, having set them up because she knew Brock would kill them.

=== Season 4 (2009–10) ===
No. overall	No. in season	Title	Written by	Original release date	Prod. code
Part 1 (2009)
40	1	"Blood of the Father, Heart of Steel"	Doc Hammer & Jackson Publick	October 18, 2009	4–46
Brock wakes up on the O.S.I. mothership with H.E.L.P.eR.'s head embedded in his chest. He escapes and has it removed before hunting down Cocktease for revenge. He bumps into an agent of anti-O.S.I. villain hunting group S.P.H.I.N.X., looking to take her down as well, distracting him and allowing her to shoot him. More S.P.H.I.N.X. agents take him away and he awakens in their hideout, where Gathers reveals that the sex change was a front to infiltrate Cocktease's operation, and he, Shore Leave, and other O.S.I. agents defected to S.P.H.I.N.X.. The now competent 21 tries to pay Rusty to clone 24 with the first issue of Marvel Comics, but he declines and Hank takes it, its value being decreased as it is damaged over the course of the episode. Nazis try to force Rusty to clone a dog with Adolf Hitler's blood in it, but Dean gets attached to the dog and refuses to kill it. Orpheus kills the Nazis but the dog escapes. Post-credits scene: As the dog menaces Hank, Brock, now with S.P.H.I.N.X., kills it and asks Hank not to tell anyone he has returned. Hank takes credit for killing Hitler when Hatred, now the Ventures's bodyguard arrives.
41	2	"Handsome Ransom"	Jackson Publick	October 25, 2009	4–40
While holding the boys hostage, The Monarch is attacked by solar-powered hero Captain Sunshine, who takes Hank with him to be his new sidekick. Hank finds him to be unstable and deeply attached to him. Rusty tries to pay The Monarch's ransom, but The Monarch only gives back Dean and steals the payment, unaware that a shrunken Hatred is hiding in the bag. He sees The Monarch tracking Sunshine and forwards his location to Rusty, who will get the payment back via Guild law if he rescues Hank first. Rusty and The Monarch converge on Sunshine's mansion and The Monarch corners him with a solar weapon, which only strengthens Sunshine. Sunshine sees Hank with Rusty, contradicting his story that he was an orphan, and disgustedly orders him to leave. Post-credits scene: An extremely sunburned Monarch, Dr. Mrs. The Monarch, and 21 return home, and The Monarch kills their taxi driver when he asks for payment.
42	3	"Perchance to Dean"	Jackson Publick	November 1, 2009	4–42
A discarded clone of Dean lives in the compound's attic, making a skin suit from dead clones so he can pass as the real Dean. While he collects the last Dean corpse he needs for his suit, a grounded Hank is snuck out by Dermott and they steal Rusty's car, hitting the clone's corpse and believing they killed the real one. Dean is pressed to start his career in science after being shown Rusty's prog rock collection, only to be attacked by the clone in the middle of his work. The police are called to the compound by a confused deliveryman and observe Hatred's new defense measure—several decoys of Rusty that explode on contact. Hank and Dermott steal a Venture tour tram and flee the compound, although Dermott abandons Hank. The Deans's fight ends when the clone hugs a Rusty decoy and is blown up. Post-credits scene: Rusty catches Hank listening to Hatred's Jimmy Buffett records while grounded and furiously berates him.
43	4	"Return to Malice"	Doc Hammer	November 8, 2009	4–43
Obsessively talking to 24's skull, 21 vows to hunt down his killer. He kidnaps the boys from the compound and tries to make them confess. He admits that 24's death is what motivated him to get into shape but is also the only thing that drives his actions and lets them go. Hatred calls Dr. Mrs. The Monarch, suspecting The Monarch's involvement in the boys' disappearance, and she offers to meet with Rusty directly. She lies to The Monarch, who is missing a photoshoot because of an allergic reaction, about where she is going, and he bitterly suspects she is doing her own shoot. He finds 21 in his treehouse and accuses him of trying to overthrow him. 21 instead expresses his admiration for The Monarch's genuine hatred, and he decides to let 21 have the tree fort for a little longer, planning to burn it. Post-credits scene: A Monarch henchman's hand crosses out the boys from 21's list of suspects, but when 21 enters the room, all he sees is 24's skull, which has moved from where he left it.
44	5	"The Revenge Society"	Doc Hammer	November 15, 2009	4–41
Phantom Limb kidnaps and wounds councilmen Red Mantle and Dragoon, having Billy sew the latter's head onto the former's body to save his life. He gets the location of the orb from Billy just as the Guild arrives to get help from Rusty, so he has Red Mantle and Dragoon break in and steal the orb for him. He confronts the Sovereign with it and demands the title of Sovereign due to his grandfather being the founder of the Guild, but the Sovereign reveals that the man usurped his power and the true heir is Dean, because of his great-great-grandfather, preventing Phantom Limb from ever being Sovereign. Phantom Limb tries to activate the orb, but a flashback reveals that Sandow disobeyed his orders and broke the orb instead of killing Lloyd. Phantom Limb is arrested, and Dean returns the title of Sovereign. Post-credits scene: Billy wakes up next to a naked Hatred, attracted to him due to his young appearance.
45	6	"Self-Medication"	Jackson Publick	November 22, 2009	4–45
Rusty is able to get out of The Monarch's arching because of his boy adventurer group therapy appointment. After the therapist dies of a poisonous snake bite, Johnny identifies one of his henchmen patients at a strip club, who works for his old arch-nemesis and councilman Dr. Z. They visit him and he convinces them of his innocence. He tries to make them see that they need to grow up, and Rusty decides to leave to spend time with his family. Hatred locks himself in the panic room after going to a movie, fearing that he may act on his pedophilic urges. Hank disguises himself as Hatred's ex-wife to lure him out before 21 and his men tranquilize him. Post-credits scene: The Monarch reveals that he ordered 21 to kill the therapist to prevent Rusty from using it as an excuse to escape his arching.
46	7	"The Better Man"	Doc Hammer	December 6, 2009	4–44
Torrid opens a portal to Hell and is sucked in, and the Order is saved from the demon that comes through by the Outrider, a powerful sorcerer who is Orpheus's ex-wife's new partner. Embarrassed, Orpheus tries to build a portal himself despite The Master's warnings that the Outrider is more talented, and goes back to Torrid's portal when he fails. The Outrider emerges, having rescued Torrid, who grapples with him and sends his spirit to Hell. The Order performs a ritual that allows them to be sent to Hell, but only The Alchemist and Orpheus go through. They meet the Outrider, who explains to Orpheus that he continuously practices risky magic to get where he is, while Orpheus gave up everything to learn it properly, something he admires. Jefferson, having the ability to act as a gateway between two worlds, pulls them back. Triana discovers that The Master's portal is in her closet, who points out that her ability to see him makes her magic and she should train herself with her mother and the Outrider right away. Post-credits scene: As Triana prepares to leave the compound, Dean, having spent the episode trying to get over her, suggests that they see other people despite having never dated, and she decides to humor him and accepts the offer.
47	8	"Pinstripes & Poltergeists"	Doc Hammer	December 13, 2009	4–47
The Monarch signs with Guild attorney Monstroso to get Rusty evicted from the compound, unknowingly signing over his own arching rights in the process. 21, now having visions of 24 talking to him, breaks into the compound in an attempt to get the drop on Monstroso, only to bump into Brock and do battle with him. He loses the fight but earns Brock's respect, who agrees to help 21 attack Monstroso, which they do. Rusty discovers that the S.P.H.I.N.X. hideout is in an abandoned building of the compound, and they wipe the memories of Billy and the boys when they discover it. Post-credits scene: Brock, covered in blood, casually eats in the compound's kitchen and greets a shocked Hank.
Part 2 (2010)
48	9	"The Diving Bell vs. The Butter-Glider"	Jackson Publick	September 12, 2010	4–50
Rusty collapses during an arching and goes catatonic. With the X-3 submarine missing, the boys go with Brock in a S.P.H.I.N.X. submarine that Billy shrinks and injects into Rusty's bloodstream. They discover that the source of Rusty's distress is a blockage caused by the X-3, which has the skeletons of Hank and Dean's clones inside of it, though the boys misunderstand the situation. The Monarch buys a glider that he becomes obsessed with, leaving both his henchmen and Dr. Mrs. The Monarch annoyed. She asks 21 to snap him out of it by having the henchmen go rogue and try to kill Rusty. The Monarch goes to arch Rusty himself when he learns of this, tying him to the glider and dragging him through the sky, but Hatred saves him by enlarging Rusty and causing the glider to crash. Post-credits scene: With Rusty back to normal size but still unconscious, Billy locates Brock and the boys in Rusty's prostate and tasks Pete with getting them out manually.
49	10	"Pomp and Circuitry"	Jackson Publick	September 19, 2010	4–48
Dean's learning bed prints out his graduation certificate, but Hank's does not. Rusty takes Dean to his old college and tries to get him in due to his legacy status, but the dean points out that Jonas was the one who made meaningful contributions to the college, not Rusty. Phantom Limb, having escaped from Guild custody, convinces the reclusive Impossible to work alongside him and start a new villain organization. They go to Impossible's public appearance at the college so Phantom Limb can steal back parts from the machine that regrew his limbs. Guild forces attack him, but he narrowly escapes with the parts. Hank tries to join S.P.H.I.N.X. and is given a series of difficult tasks by Gathers, but is denied access despite passing all of them. Despondent, he hits his learning bed in frustration, which prints out his jammed graduation certificate. Post-credits scene: Impossible regrows Phantom Limb's missing limbs and they are visited by a homeless Ünderbheit, who asks to join them.
50	11	"Any Which Way But Zeus"	Doc Hammer	September 26, 2010	4–51
An apparition of Zeus begins kidnapping underlings and having them fight to the death for the pleasure of him and a masked man named Zero. The Guild, O.S.I., and Phantom Limb's "Revenge Society" hold a summit to investigate the issue, guessing that Zeus could be the original Captain Sunshine, who is actually being held prisoner by Zero. Shore Leave and 21 work together to kill Zeus, only to realize he is a cardboard cutout. Zero reveals himself to be the surviving Henchman 1, having tricked Sunshine into working for him. Billy and Pete free the captives and they defeat Zero together. As Rusty grows despondent at not being kidnapped, Hatred and the boys blindfold him and tie him to a chair, with his only person to talk to being a teddy bear with voice lines. He tells his "captors" to kill Hank when they claim they have the boys, only to tell a disguised Hank that he knows he is not cut out for the life of a super scientist and does not want him to suffer torture for Rusty's career. Post-credits scene: Hank and Hatred watch Rusty continue to talk to the teddy bear, and Hank says he will release him "after his ransom checks clear."
51	12	"Everybody Comes to Hank's"	Doc Hammer	October 3, 2010	4–52
Dean and Rusty leave the compound for Dean's New York internship. Hank investigates Dermott's true father when he claims it is Brock. Brock denies it, but Dermott gives Hank a Venture keychain from his mother. Hank, who has been flirting with Dermott's sister Nikki, goes to see her and they have sex. Orpheus and the Alchemist perform a spell on the keychain that reveals the past to them: Dermott's father is actually Rusty, who impregnated Nikki, the president of his fan club, when she was fifteen, and her mother promised to raise Dermott as her son. Hank learns this when he touches the keychain and allows S.P.H.I.N.X. to wipe his memory. Post-credits scene: Hank watches a recording of himself before the memory wipe boasting about losing his virginity. A disheveled Dean returns to the compound, and a portal opens in the boys' bedroom and a version of Rusty with hair comes through.
52	13	"Bright Lights, Dean City"	Jackson Publick	October 10, 2010	4–53
Dean is interning for Impossible, while Rusty stays with him in New York after becoming obsessed with writing an autobiographical musical. The Revenge Society holds auditions for the team with little success and find the musical's script that Rusty asked Dean to make copies of. They use this to lure Rusty to Impossible Industries, but new member Fat Chance, who has a portal in his chest, trips and falls on Rusty, sending him into the portal. Dean investigates the power outage that Impossible planned and discovers his brother-in-law being used to power the building. He frees him and he sets the building on fire, burning the only copy of the musical in the process. Post-credits scene: Back at the compound, the other Rusty drags the boys' Rusty out of the portal, revealing where Fat Chance sent him. The other Rusty tells him that Rusty tried to kill and replace him because the musical was a success in his universe.
53	14	"Assisted Suicide"	Doc Hammer	October 17, 2010	4–49
After Rusty becomes mute and suicidal, Orpheus goes into his mind to understand why, unaware that it is The Monarch controlling his brain from the inside. Orpheus meets Rusty's representations of his obsession with sex and death in the forms of Billy and Pete. They encounter Rusty's lustful id, who forces Billy and Pete to kiss for his amusement so they can pass. They then meet his ego, who is trying to fix a broken puppet of a young Rusty, and Orpheus brings the id's women to do the job. They finally meet the imprisoned super-ego, who helps them escape Rusty's mind. 21 and Dr. Mrs. The Monarch bond while protecting The Monarch's body, eventually kissing, but they are interrupted by The Monarch waking up when he is attacked by Rusty's memories of the dead Hanks and Deans. Post-credits scene: Hank asked the awakened Rusty if he is okay, and he recounts a teenage memory where he was humiliated by Team Venture on his birthday. Hank comments that it "sounds like a nightmare," and Rusty bitterly responds that "what I went through today was 'like a nightmare'. What happened when I was sixteen? That is my life."
54	15	"The Silent Partners"	Doc Hammer	October 24, 2010	4–54
While faking being a doctor at a hospital, Billy notices a trio of mute, sinister businessmen known as "the Investors" stealing the heart of the dying King Gorilla. They kidnap him and take him to Monstroso, who treats Billy lavishly and arranges for him to have sex with a trio of prostitutes. Billy believes he is being groomed to be turned into a vampire, but Monstroso explains that he made a deal with King Gorilla for his heart upon his death, his own heart failing him, and he licenses Billy as a doctor so he can perform a heart transplant. Tracking the Investors through a homing device in Billy's hand, Brock and Shore Leave sneak on to Monstroso's yacht. The Investors easily escape them and Brock comes across Billy in the middle of surgery. Brock tries to convince him to let Monstroso die, but Billy insists upon finishing properly. Post-credits scene: Billy finishes the surgery and informs Brock, revealing they have moved to the S.P.H.I.N.X. compound. Brock asks if he can kill Monstroso.
55	16	"Operation: P.R.O.M."	Doc Hammer & Jackson Publick	November 21, 2010	4–55
Gathers meets with Treister to negotiate S.P.H.I.N.X. being left alone in exchange for handing over Monstroso, but when he reveals that Monstroso told him there are Guild moles inside the O.S.I., Treister turns into a "Hulk" and rampages. Cardholder and Doe reveal that Treister actually has prostate cancer and they have been manipulating him to think otherwise, planning to take over when he is deemed too insane to run it. They detain Gathers and go to kill Monstroso, but Treister summons him to the control room and reveals he knows of Cardholder and Doe's deception, having recruited S.P.H.I.N.X. to hide in a fake Monstroso body and detain them. Impressed with Gathers's skill and bravery, he gives him control of the O.S.I. and launches himself into space so aliens can cure his cancer. Rusty throws a prom for the boys at the compound, and Triana goes with Dean as a friend, but leaves in disgust when he cannot get over the fact that she has a boyfriend. Rusty invites several escorts to the prom and drugs them with a lustful chemical made from a mutant fly. 21, burying 24's skull where he died but still being plagued by visions, is invited, and Orpheus helps him realize that he was imagining 24. The Monarch gets in by bribing Hatred with his ex-wife and approaches 21, assuming he is doing undercover work, but 21 quits. Cocktease, undercover in S.P.H.I.N.X., kidnaps the real Monstroso. Brock's pursuit of her ends with her car on the edge of a cliff, and she reveals that she is dating Monstroso and the escorts are actually her assassins that will kill everyone unless she calls them off. When Brock threatens to kill Monstroso, she sends the car off the cliff with her inside, and he races back to the compound to find everyone dancing with the escorts, who have been drugged by Rusty. They mutate into insect creatures and Brock leaps into battle. Post-credits scene: Dermott and Hank help Dean build Triana's name out of wood on her lawn and light them on fire, but all but the "T" collapse. The Outrider finds Dean, dressed in a "ghost" costume, standing in front of the burning T, and gives him earnest advice on moving on from her. Dean considers his advice before telling him "fuck you!"

=== Special (2011) ===
Title	Directed by	Written by	Original release date	Prod. code
"From the Ladle to the Grave: The Shallow Gravy Story"	Jackson Publick & Juno Lee	Jackson Publick & Doc Hammer	August 28, 2011	S2
The episode is presented as a documentary that follows Hank and Dermott's band, Shallow Gravy, and their "hit" song "Jacket". It documents Hank and Dermott's friendship, the destruction and rebuilding of H.E.L.P.eR., and their short-lived attempt at touring. Rusty learns Dermott's last name and, to his horror, realizes that he may be his illegitimate son. Post-credits scene: The documentary closes with showing "Jacket"'s music video.

=== Special (2012) ===
Title	Directed by	Written by	Original release date	Prod. code	US viewers (millions)
"A Very Venture Halloween"	Jackson Publick	Doc Hammer	October 28, 2012	504	1.474
On Halloween, Dermott and Hank dare Dean to enter a supposedly haunted house that Rusty has warned them to stay away from. There, he meets Ben, a geneticist who worked with Jonas to develop the boys' cloning project, and he reveals to Dean that he is a clone. The Order hosts a meeting of magic users at the compound, where they perform feats of sorcery to impress each other. While Orpheus is out of the room, the Alchemist raises an army of zombies that chase Hank and Dermott, and The Master destroys them. After lecturing the magicians, he leaves Orpheus to deal with them, who gives them a speech about the spirit of Halloween. As Dean mutely walks back to the compound and stares at it, Orpheus proclaims that Halloween "is the night we discover who we truly are." Post-credits scene: Hank finds Dean on the compound's roof and asks what happened in Ben's house, but Dean does not have the heart to tell him the truth.

=== Season 5 (2013) ===
No. overall	No. in season	Title	Directed by	Written by	Original release date	Prod. code	US viewers (millions)
56	1	"What Color Is Your Cleansuit?"	Jackson Publick	Doc Hammer & Jackson Publick	June 2, 2013	509	1.231
56	1	"What Color Is Your Cleansuit?"	Jackson Publick	Doc Hammer & Jackson Publick	June 2, 2013	510	1.231
Brock finds that Monstroso's body is a fake, while S.P.H.I.N.X. returns to the O.S.I., leaving 21 as its only agent. A dejected Dean burns his learning bed and he and Hank take separate rooms. J.J. reminds Rusty that he agreed to build an energy shield for the in-progress Gargantua-2, so he sources interns from a college to work on it and gets a loan from wealthy memorabilia purchaser Augustus St. Cloud, Billy's archnemesis. The radiation the shield emits mutates the workers and they begin eating the non-mutated assistants. The Monarch, still in denial about 21 quitting and believing Rusty is making mutant warriors, asks Dr. Mrs. The Monarch to make some of their own. The interns finish the shield but lock it inside their living area, planning to use it to mutate the world. 21 takes control of the situation and sends Billy and Pete to get a decontamination device Rusty sold to St. Cloud. He agrees to give it back if Billy can beat him in a trivia battle, which he narrowly does. A mutant Dean has been flirting with has him fight their leader and he wins, being crowned the mutant king. As Rusty releases an improvised "antidote," the Cocoon arrives and The Monarch unleashes his mutants, which Dr. Mrs. The Monarch reveals are actually butterflies full of antidote serum. The next day, Rusty hands over the cleaned and finished shield. Post-credits scene: The Monarch proclaims his love for Dr. Mrs. The Monarch, both of them high on Rusty's "antidote," which flooded into the Cocoon through the butterfly tube.
57	2	"Venture Libre"	Jackson Publick	Jackson Publick	June 9, 2013	501	1.498
Rusty is summoned by the military to a South American country in revolution because of its leader, Venturestein. The X-1 is attacked by a Pteranodon and Hank is separated from Rusty and Hatred, who are captured by Venturestein's men. Venturestein explains that after being sent to destabilize the revolution, he ended up joining it and freeing other tortured science experiments. He uses the tablet the military gave Rusty to broadcast his message of revolt to experiments around the world, and refuses to kill Rusty when his comrades demand it. Hank begins to frighten the revolutionaries when he dresses up like a bat and begins killing them, and they try to kill Rusty and Hatred, who escape with Hank to the beach. A congresswoman that has been trying to get ahold of Rusty so he can vote for her lands in the middle of the conflict and tries to get everyone's attention, only to be killed when she triggers the dropped tablet's explosive function. Post-credits scene: While Rusty watches the rebuilt congresswoman speak on TV, Hank and Dermott try to practice with H.E.L.P.eR., annoyed that Dean rebuilt his body but reduced his drumming ability in the process.
58	3	"SPHINX Rising"	Jackson Publick	Doc Hammer	June 16, 2013	502	1.286
21, trying to work as a crime fighter, clashes with the O.S.I.. He puts out an ad for more people to join S.P.H.I.N.X., attracting its old, villainous members, and Hank, who is given a S.P.H.I.N.X. strength suit. The old members commandeer the S.P.H.I.N.X. ship and plan to use it to attack the O.S.I. mothership, but Brock and Shore Leave stop them. A guilty 21 laments his failure, but Brock assures him he had good intentions. The Monarch and Dr. Mrs. The Monarch infiltrate the compound in disguise and plant bombs in its tunnels, but The Monarch is shocked to find a picture of him and Rusty as children with Jonas and his parents behind them, a meeting he does not remember. Hatred finds the bombs and assumes 21 is responsible. He has Dean leave them in front of S.P.H.I.N.X. headquarters and tries to get him to talk about his attitude, but Dean does not reveal what is troubling him. Post-credits scene: As Gathers destroys the empty S.P.H.I.N.X. ship, The Monarch detonates the bombs, unwittingly destroying the headquarters.
59	4	"Spanakopita!"	Jackson Publick	Jackson Publick	June 23, 2013	503	1.056
Rusty takes Billy, Pete and Hatred to the annual "Spanakopita" festival held on a Greek island that he has gone to since he was a child, but the leader, Giorgos, makes Hatred suspicious. Giorgos explains when confronted that they accidentally kidnapped Rusty while plundering the X-2 and made up the festival, hastily named after spinach pie, to satiate him, but he came back years later believing it to be real, so they kept up the ruse. Seeing how happy the festival makes Rusty, Hatred keeps the truth hidden from him. St. Cloud follows them to the island and decides to participate in the festival's competition, making a bet with Rusty for the X-1 if he wins. As St. Cloud cheats his way through the challenges, Rusty orders Billy and Pete to take care of him, but they are caught upon sneaking onto St. Cloud's boat and discovering a stash of drachmas, used to tally victories in the challenges. St. Cloud ties them up, leaving Pete to burn in the sun, but St. Cloud's albino assistant frees them to honor the "albino code." Billy presents Giorgos with St. Cloud's drachmas and he is declared the winner. St. Cloud believes he has purchased the island to prevent Rusty from enjoying his victory, but Giorgos actually sold him the island's worth in spinach pie. Post-credits scene: A flashback reveals that Jonas took Giorgos's eye for kidnapping Rusty, and in the present, he victoriously counts St. Cloud's money.
60	5	"O.S.I. Love You"	Jackson Publick	Jackson Publick	June 30, 2013	507	1.311
The O.S.I. capture Monstroso and Cocktease. Knowing the Guild will kill him no matter what, Monstroso explains what the Council is to Brock and identifies one of their members, Boggles the Clue Clown. When Brock asks about the Investors, they appear and kill Monstroso. Cocktease escapes confinement and Hank, on board to refill Hatred's anti-pedophile medication, pursues her in the strength suit. She easily defeats him and takes it. Brock follows her to one of the engines of the mothership and throws her into it. The federal agents who have been getting an account of the situation leave, and a flashback reveals that Gathers stopped Brock from killing Cocktease, explaining that she was hired to kill all the O.S.I. double agents on board and is working for them now, and Brock throws the empty strength suit into the engine. Gathers marks Cocktease as deceased, only for the real agents to enter to interview them about the situation. The "agents," actually the Investors, vanish. Post-credits scene: Hank, his limbs atrophied from wearing the suit for weeks, rehabilitates them while Gathers expresses sympathy over him losing the suit's breasts.
61	6	"Momma's Boys"	Jackson Publick	Doc Hammer	July 7, 2013	508	1.526
Hank and Dermott use the teddy bear Rusty befriended to distract him so they can sneak out, but when he becomes obsessed with it and believes villains have kidnapped his "friend," they decide to track down the voice of the bear to end things. 21 informs them that the bear's voice actor is in an asylum for insane criminals, so they rob a bank and Hank and 21 are committed. They meet the voice actor in the asylum, but learn that all of the patients are part of a cult led by Myra, who Dean has been in contact with because of his desire for a mother. She tries to get her cult to put Dean back into her womb, but in the process admits she is not the boys' mother. Hank and 21 rally the patients to revolt and escape. Orpheus, sensing a Venture son in distress, is summoned to an imprisoned Dermott and frees him. While Rusty and Hatred look for his "friend," their car flips over off a cliff, and they are narrowly rescued by the escaped voice actor. Post-credits scene: Hank and Rusty recount the events of their day to each other. Dermott leaves and jokingly calls Rusty "dad," leaving him and the boys shocked.
62	7	"Bot Seeks Bot"	Jackson Publick	Jackson Publick	July 14, 2013	505	1.343
The O.S.I. spy on Boggles's funeral and identify cyborg councilman Vendata. Shunned by his peers because of his limited emotions, he posts a request for a date with another robot on Guild forums, and the O.S.I. disguise hero Ghost Robot as villain Galacticon and have him go with Vendata. They leave the restaurant to go to councilman Don Hell's club, and Brock and Shore Leave disguise themselves as villains and follow him in. Rusty, believing they are going to a party, follows them with Billy, and they are caught by Hell's men. Vendata catches Brock and Ghost Robot in the bathroom, and Brock beats up and strips him, disguising himself as Vendata. They move to leave when the real Galacticon arrives, only for Hell to reveal he has Rusty and Billy on the "Wheel of Torture" and invite the clubgoers to play. Brock steals the winning token so he can stall for time while Shore Leave cuts through the suspension of the club's giant disco ball, but they are stopped by The Monarch arriving. Dr. Mrs. The Monarch uses Guild law to prove that the torture is illegal. Rusty and The Monarch are left alone, only for the ball to fall on the former. Post-credits scene: Dr. Mrs. The Monarch is invited by the Sovereign to join the Council, but she asks to talk it over with The Monarch. The Revenge Society observes this in secret, now working with Killinger.
63	8	"The Devil's Grip"	Jackson Publick	Doc Hammer	July 21, 2013	506	1.102
Believing Rusty to be dead, Hatred sends the boys to their godfathers. Dean goes to live with Colonel Gentleman, who has him document his old stories for his memoirs. Hank goes to Boca Raton to live with the Action Man in his retirement community, where they bury Entmann after the Action Man accidentally crushed him with his rocking chair. To fulfill a Team Venture tradition, he urinates on the grave, and has Hank, the youngest present, defecate on it. Hank helps him win over his love interest, Billy's mother. Hatred reluctantly asks 21 for help infiltrating the Cocoon and finding Rusty, but soon takes a liking to him. While one of the moppets catches Hatred and convinces him that 21 sold him out, 21 convinces the henchmen that the moppets killed 24. The Monarch repeatedly attempts to torture Rusty, but all of them fail. He gives up and decides to let him go, but claims to Dr. Mrs. The Monarch that he broke Rusty's will and grew tired of him. Just as 21 returns to The Monarch, Hatred launches a missile at the Cocoon in revenge for his supposed betrayal, and the downed Cocoon crashes into The Monarch's house and destroys it. Post-credits scene: The Monarch moves into his childhood Newark home with 21 and Dr. Mrs. The Monarch. Entmann's body is relocated to the compound. Hank asks Dean what has been troubling him, and he reveals that they are clones, but Hank is delighted by this, which seems to cheer Dean up. As those present urinate on the grave, Hank, realizing Dean is slightly younger than him, excitedly says "you're gonna love this."

=== Special (2015) ===
Title	Directed by	Written by	Original release date	Prod. code	US viewers (millions)
"All This and Gargantua-2"	Jackson Publick & Juno Lee	Doc Hammer & Jackson Publick	January 19, 2015	601	1.208
"All This and Gargantua-2"	Jackson Publick & Juno Lee	Doc Hammer & Jackson Publick	January 19, 2015	602	1.208
Several councilmen are killed by the Sovereign when the O.S.I. closes in and he declares his plan to destroy the finished Gargantua-2 to the remainders, including Dr. Mrs. The Monarch, trying to kill them when they refuse. Dr. Z, Red Mantle, and Dragoon deal with Gathers for full immunity in exchange for the Sovereign's location. The Revenge Society, squatting in The Monarch's new house, relocate to "Meteor Majeure", the space base of previous Guild leader Force Majeure, also planning to attack Gargantua-2. The Monarch discovers Phantom Limb's plans to attack the station and decides to stop him so he can be councilman. He breaks into the compound and steals a rocket, burning the compound in the process. Dr. Mrs. The Monarch goes to kill the Sovereign after learning that The Monarch will die if he reaches Gargantua-2, where he reveals that he is not actually Bowie, but a shapeshifter. He sets his office to self-destruct before leaving. Guild officers Watch and Ward save her, and an O.S.I. sniper accidentally shoots The Sovereign while he is in the form of an eagle. The office's escape pod drives into The Monarch's ship, taking it to Meteor Majuere. Brock, having snuck onboard Gargantua-2 to track The Investors, is detained after being found out. Treister's frozen body is found in space. Fat Chance sneaks aboard and the rest of the Society come in through his portal. Secretly taking orders from the Sovereign, Phantom Limb deactivates the energy shield, leaving the station to be buffeted by asteroids. Brock recognizes Zero, now part of the Society, and goads him into getting close so he can kill him. Hank frees him, and Rusty and Dean reboot the shield together. The damaged station prepares to self-destruct, and Sally convinces Impossible to leave the Society so their son will still have a father. Knowing the explosion will kill the escaping passengers, a cancer-stricken J.J. pilots the station and has Treister, mutated into a Hulk by space radiation, push it away, killing them both. The Investors attack their brother, Killinger, on Meteor Majeure, but he kills them just as The Monarch and Dr. Mrs. The Monarch arrive. Post-credits scene: Phantom Limb arrives at Meteor Majuere, and Killinger reveals he orchestrated everything to form a new Council. The Monarch becomes excited at the prospect of being a councilman, but Killinger informs him that he has not been chosen.

=== Season 6 (2016) ===
No. overall	No. in season	Title	Directed by	Written by	Original release date	Prod. code	US viewers (millions)
64	1	"Hostile Makeover"	Jackson Publick	Jackson Publick	January 31, 2016	603	1.100
The Ventures move into the penthouse of Venture Industries' headquarters, VenTech Tower, and Brock is reassigned as their bodyguard. They are accosted by the Crusaders Action League (C.A.L.), who Rusty refuses the hired protection of. The Monarch and 21 go to the tower and drug the pirate captain, getting him re-addicted to tranquilizer. While looking for attractive women, Hank notices one face-down in her pool and uses Brock's grappling gun to zipline to her building, only for her to reveal that she has gills. Hank falls off the line when he waves to her but is rescued by a member of the C.A.L., who mistake Brock and H.E.L.P.eR. for villains and fight them. With the Guild falling apart after the Sovereign's death, Dr. Mrs. The Monarch meets with high-ranking, mutated villain Wide Wale, who lives across the street from Rusty. He agrees to lend his financial support in exchange for a seat on the Council and exclusive arching rights, and she concedes to his terms. Post-credits scene:
65	2	"Maybe No Go"	Jackson Publick	Doc Hammer	February 7, 2016	604	0.884
Billy has one of his collectables, the ball from Duran Duran's "Is There Something I Should Know?" music video, stolen by St. Cloud. Knowing the importance it holds to pop culture, he threatens to send it back in time unless Billy and Pete sell him their company, which they do. The Monarch discovers that several villains are in line to arch Rusty before him, so he and 21 track down one of the villains and threaten her into signing away her arching rights. When they return to his house, the people remodeling it have discovered a secret door in the study that leads to a cave full of gadgets. Desperate for tranquilizer, the captain climbs into a nearby zoo's polar bear enclosure and takes the darts used on the animal. Having fired almost all of the Venture Industries employees, Rusty forces the captain to get clean. Receiving a tip from Shore Leave that Wide Wale is about to arch Rusty, Brock works with Hatred to trick him into stealing a fake valuable, and he returns home to find that they have placed the polar bear inside. Post-credits scene: St. Cloud reveals that he has sold Billy and Pete's company to Venture Industries.
66	3	"Faking Miracles"	Jackson Publick	Jackson Publick	February 14, 2016	605	1.176
While looking through J.J.'s inventions, Rusty accidentally frees a swarm of superhuman nanobots that enter Dean. 21 deduces that the cave belonged to the vigilante Blue Morpho, who The Monarch realizes was his father. He attends a Guild event at Wide Wale's but is refused entry because he arrives in costume. Duplicating villain Copycat allows The Monarch to borrow a suit, but splits in two, drugs him, and steals his costume. He breaks into Rusty's penthouse and urinates on his furniture while simultaneously pointing this out to Dr. Mrs. The Monarch, leaving her enraged that The Monarch is seemingly illegally arching Rusty. Hank, now working as a pizza deliveryman, is called to deliver to Wide Wale, and realizes that his daughter Sirena is the woman with gills. He navigates around Wide Wale's aggressive henchman Rocco so he can ask her out, and she accepts, attracted to his risk-taking. Post-credits scene: Dean painfully urinates out the nanobots and learns that with their help, he passed his college entrance exam.
67	4	"Rapacity in Blue"	Jackson Publick	Doc Hammer	February 21, 2016	606	1.075
Rusty has Billy and Pete develop a mind control gas that instead causes religious fervor. 21 suggests that The Monarch go out as Blue Morpho so he can take out villains in line to arch Rusty, which he rejects until he sees a tape with his father and Jonas together and becomes bored of Guild paperwork. As Rusty tests his gas on his current arch, Haranguetan, and accidentally gasses Brock, The Monarch and 21, dressed as Blue Morpho and his sidekick Kano, arrive and rescue Billy when Haranguetan tries to kill him. 21 makes Haranguetan fall to his death through the hole in the floor that Wide Wale's arching created. Brock storms over to the apartment of Warriana, a C.A.L. member that he is attracted to but intimidated by, and professes his love for her. Post-credits scene: An elated Monarch and 21 return home to find Dr. Mrs. The Monarch, having come home early. The Monarch allows her to think he went out with 21 to spite her so as to avoid suspicion.
68	5	"Tanks for Nuthin'"	Jackson Publick	Jackson Publick	February 28, 2016	607	0.986
Brock wakes up with a dismissive Warriana. While consoling Haranguetan's widow Battleaxe, Dr. Mrs. The Monarch receives footage of Blue Morpho killing him. The Monarch and 21 go to get the Blue Morpho's car out of an impound lot, where Dr. Mrs. The Monarch spots them after taking Battleaxe there to get her and Haranguetan's tank, but they escape when The Monarch accidentally activates the car's flight function. Battleaxe finds the footage and believes that Rusty is the Blue Morpho, taking the tank to go kill him. Rusty's new arch (Dean's Philosophy professor, Think Tank) attacks him and Brock, but Warriana teams up with Brock to save them and they make their relationship official. Battleaxe accidentally runs over Rusty's arch as he leaves and drives into the hole. Dr. Mrs. The Monarch sees the Blue Morpho's car flying around VenTech Tower and grows suspicious of Rusty. Post-credits scene: Dr. Mrs. The Monarch returns home and apologizes to The Monarch for being short with him, darkly claiming "I know who my enemy is."
69	6	"It Happening One Night"	Jackson Publick	Jackson Publick & Doc Hammer	March 6, 2016	608	0.990
Dr. Mrs. The Monarch relays her suspicions that Rusty is the Blue Morpho to the Council, but they do not take her seriously. The Monarch drugs her so he can plant bombs in the vacant lair of the Doom Factory team, Rusty's new arch. The Doom Factory distract Rusty with their bizarre artistic presentations and steal his equipment, summoning their lair, which The Monarch gets stuck on. He escapes as they leave and the detonator falls out of his jacket, setting off the bombs and killing the team. Hank and Sirena go on their date, and Dean, Pete and Billy help facilitate several "random" events that Hank put together to impress her. As Brock and Rocco pursue them, Sirena admits she likes the lengths Hank will go to, and they kiss just as they are found and separated. Post-credits scene: Dr. Mrs. The Monarch wakes up to The Monarch also pretending to have been drugged, and she gets a call from Phantom Limb informing her of the Doom Factory's death, agreeing to put Guild resources into stopping Blue Morpho.
70	7	"A Party for Tarzan"	Jackson Publick	Doc Hammer	March 13, 2016	609	0.913
After meeting Christopher Lambert at a party, Rusty invites him to watch a lunar eclipse at VenTech Tower. The Monarch goes to arch his new nemesis legitimately while he sends 21 as Blue Morpho to abduct and kill Rusty's next arch. The Monarch sends a picture of his arching work to Dr. Mrs. The Monarch, while 21 has the villain call her before killing him. She misses the messages as Rusty steps out to watch the eclipse from his balcony, while the Council sets up a sniper rifle to kill him. Wide Wale makes Dr. Mrs. The Monarch shoot him, but Rusty, having stolen the Blue Morpho jacket from a tailor after 21 dropped it off, is saved by the jacket's bulletproof lining. Post-credits scene: As Dr. Mrs. The Monarch berates the Councilmen for their sloppy work, she notices Lambert, having arrived to the party, locked outside VenTech Tower and trying to get in.
71	8	"Red Means Stop"	Jackson Publick	Doc Hammer	March 20, 2016	610	0.952
Two villains wake up in a decrepit bathroom full of dead bodies, both chained to pipes. One of them learns that the other has been there for weeks and gone insane, who cannibalizes him like he did the dead men. The Guild and the O.S.I. stage a sting at VenTech Tower to catch Blue Morpho, where Watch, Ward, Gathers, and councilman Phineas Phage disguise themselves as the Ventures and H.E.L.P.eR.. Rusty's feared new arch, Red Death, "attacks." The Monarch and 21 convince Red Death's family to leave their home and call him, pretending to have kidnapped them. He storms the Morpho Cave, forcing The Monarch to explain his recent actions. Red Death expresses sympathy towards his determination and explains that he has to suppress his own urge to kill regularly, advising The Monarch to continue his quest. 21 reveals that he lost the nerve to kill the rest of the villains arching Rusty and that he locked them in the cave's bathroom, unaware that one had gone insane and killed the rest. Red Death agrees to waive his arching rights and not tell the Guild what he learned in exchange for getting to kill the man. Post-credits scene: Guild agent S-464 and O.S.I. agent Kimberly McManus, having fallen in love during the sting operation, agree to reconnect next time they see each other.

=== Season 7 (2018) ===
No. overall	No. in season	Title	Directed by	Written by	Original release date	Prod. code	US viewers (millions)
72	1	"The Venture Bros. & The Curse of the Haunted Problem"	Juno Lee	Jackson Publick	August 5, 2018	701	0.660
Two years prior, J.J. finds the PROBLEM light in the wreckage of Gargantua-1 and installs it in VenTech Tower's lobby. In the present, it drains the fluid from nearby bugs. The Ventures are troubled by their technology going haywire and Dean calls the Order. Rusty asks Pete to trace the source of the issue on the tower's computer, but a possessed H.E.L.P.eR. attacks him. Billy tells Team Venture of the issue and they hurry to VenTech Tower. Hank continues his relationship with Sirena despite Wide Wale's efforts to keep him away, deciding to win Wide Wale's honor by infiltrating his house disguised as a villain and offering his service. Wide Wale agrees so long as he kills a restrained Monarch. The Order performs an exorcism in the lobby and the PROBLEM light turns on. They open it just as Team Venture arrives, revealing that Jonas's barely-living head is inside. Team Venture explains that the light exists to keep Jonas alive, and before Rusty can talk to him, Pete damages the light's mechanics, causing the tower to shake.
73	2	"The Rorqual Affair"	Juno Lee	Doc Hammer	August 12, 2018	702	0.672
21 wakes up late to help The Monarch with his attempt on Wide Wale's life, getting The Monarch captured. Wide Wale unmasks him and reveals that his brother is Dr. Dugong, planning to kill him in revenge. With pressure from the Guild mounting to capture Blue Morpho, 21 tries to reveal the truth to Dr. Mrs. The Monarch but finds that the Morpho Cave has been replaced with an ordinary basement. They go to Red Death for help, who agrees in exchange for a seat on the Council. He massacres the staff of an O.S.I. records building and retrieves Dugong's file. As Wide Wale orders Hank to shoot The Monarch, 21 and Dr. Mrs. The Monarch stop him and Red Death bursts into the penthouse with Dugong, regenerated from his starfish DNA, getting Wide Wale to stop. Post-credits scene: The group watches as someone driving Blue Morpho's car and wearing his outfit converges on VenTech Tower, The Monarch gleefully realizing that this exonerates him.
74	3	"Arrears in Science"	Juno Lee	Jackson Publick	August 19, 2018	703	0.611
The man in the Blue Morpho costume reveals himself to be Vendata and the shaking of the tower causes the Venture logo to fall onto the entrance, sealing everyone inside. The shaking stops when Vendata plugs himself into the PROBLEM light so he can talk to Jonas. Various parties recount the story of the Blue Morpho. Blue Morpho obeyed Jonas because he was blackmailed with a sex tape, and Jonas had his wife "swing by my compound" when she was having trouble conceiving. When she became pregnant, Jonas took Kano as payment. After Blue Morpho died in a plane crash, Jonas made his remains into a cyborg, but Kano was forced to kill him after he tried to strangle Rusty while malfunctioning. Dr. Z found him and reprogrammed him into the evil Vendata, who was taken by Red Death to hijack a movie night on Gargantua-1, where Jonas caught him trying to broadcast the sex tape. He told Vendata that he was the Blue Morpho, prompting Vendata to open the bay doors, killing Jonas. After Brock beat him up in Don Hell's club, he regained fragments of his memory and walked to Newark, putting on his old costume and seeking out Jonas. Back in the present, the Action Man has a stroke and Pete uses the lobby's shrink ray to get Team Venture out of the tower. The Monarch breaks in, planning to kill Blue Morpho to clear his name. His presence distracts Blue Morpho and he addresses him as "Malcolm", prompting Jonas to seize him with the light's tendrils. Blue Morpho engages his thrusters and they fatally crash. The Monarch addresses Blue Morpho as "daddy?" and claims he killed both men when the Guild arrives. Post-credits scene: At the Macy's Thanksgiving Day Parade, Team Venture discusses the health of the Action Man, who is in a coma. A balloon of a young Rusty gets loose and flies away.
75	4	"The High Cost of Loathing"	Juno Lee	Jackson Publick	August 26, 2018	704	0.544
After Rusty sustains severe injuries jumping out a window while demonstrating his new technology, Hank uses him being gone as an excuse to rent out his old room to a German couple. With his relationship with Sirena straining because college is taking up all her time, he tries to admit his insecurities to Rusty, only to realize he is high on morphine. Hatred and Brock kill the German couple, assuming them to be intruders. The Monarch is assessed by the Council as a level five (out of ten) villain, and Dr. Mrs The Monarch advises him to arch legitimately for a while when he overdraws on his bank account. Dean moves into his college campus and learns that Rusty has enrolled him in multiple science classes against his will. He talks to his superhero professor, who encourages him to try his botany class, with Sirena being the only other student. The Monarch crashes the class because the professor is his new arch, and a fed-up Dean pays him one million dollars to leave them alone. Sirena thanks him with a kiss on the cheek, and Dean realizes he is attracted to her. Post-credits scene: The Monarch is celebrated as the Guild's top earner of the month and is moved up a level.
76	5	"The Inamorata Consequence"	Juno Lee	Doc Hammer	September 2, 2018	705	0.640
The Guild and the O.S.I. agree to renegotiate the terms of the "Treaty of Tolerance" at the ruins of the compound. Hank hangs out with Dermott, now an O.S.I. soldier, and they witness S-464 and McManus almost having sex, but she stops and leaves in disgust when she notices "PP" on his belt. Dean goes to Ben's house and meets a model of H.E.L.P.eR. that can speak, watching the house while Ben is away, who acknowledges that Dean has been cloned - yet addresses him as "Rusty" as he leaves. The Guild and the O.S.I. are unable to reach an agreement over the logistics of their conditions, and Rusty, the mediator, snaps at them and accuses them of being childish, forcing them to come to an agreement. As Dermott reports the incident with S-464 to Gathers and Dr. Mrs. The Monarch, Dean, realizing Rusty is also a clone, hugs him. Post-credits scene: Dr. Mrs. The Monarch explains to Phantom Limb that "PP" stands for "Peril Partnership", a rival villain organization, meaning they have a mole in the Guild.
77	6	"The Bellicose Proxy"	Juno Lee	Doc Hammer	September 9, 2018	706	0.551
Dr. Mrs. The Monarch convinces S-464 to act as a double agent for the Guild in exchange for helping him get McManus back. The Monarch takes part in the "Little Villain" training program, where he is assigned to St. Cloud. He and 21 find their efforts to make him more menacing futile, although Dr. Mrs. The Monarch illegally upgrades his weapons above his level, knowing it will catch the O.S.I.'s attention. St. Cloud announces his arching of Billy and Pete, who Rusty and Brock try and fail to make ready to fight him. During the fight, St. Cloud accidentally gases them and himself with nitrous oxide. S-464 talks to McManus when she arrives and they reconcile. Post-credits scene: As Billy and Pete recount their triumph over St. Cloud to the boys, Brock asks Rusty if they are ever going to tell them that they were hallucinating and fell asleep next to St. Cloud, which Rusty asserts they never will.
78	7	"The Unicorn in Captivity"	Juno Lee	Jackson Publick	September 16, 2018	707	0.680
Rusty finishes his teleporter and Brock takes him to Gathers, who urges him to give it up so it does not destabilize the world economy. When he refuses, Gathers leaves him to talk to the Illuminati, who invite him to a gathering to try and change his mind. There, they give him the choice between having anything he wants by giving up the teleporter or being killed. The Monarch is tasked to work with a team put together by Copycat, planning to steal the teleporters from VenTech Tower. 21 arrives to give The Monarch his costume's wings and discovers that Copycat is using the team as a decoy. Copycat intentionally triggers the security system after Brock arrives to collect the teleporters, sending one of them to the panic room, and The Monarch winds up in it when Copycat's helicopter clips him. As Brock kills the team, Copycat airlifts the panic room out of the tower, only for Hatred to shoot down the helicopter, killing him. The Monarch escapes by using the teleporter, winding up next to 21, who has taken the other and is driving away. They crash and wind up with both teleporters after the other one falls out of the dropped panic room, narrowly escaping from Brock. Post-credits scene: Rusty, believing he is having an orgy, is actually in an O.S.I. simulation and having sex with a machine.
79	8	"The Terminus Mandate"	Juno Lee	Doc Hammer	September 23, 2018	708	0.610
Rusty seeks out Teresa Didae, a woman notorious for marrying wealthy men before she kills them for their money. The Council meets with a Partnership representative, who agrees to leave the Guild alone if they are paid off. Dr. Mrs. The Monarch learns that to fully become the governing body of the Guild, the Council must perform one last arch and retire as villains. Red Mantle and Dragoon fearfully put off finding out who their arch is, only to learn that all of them are dead. Phantom Limb and Gathers have a penis-measuring competition, which the former wins by an inch. Red Death does not read his arch letter and instead kidnaps the Partnership man, ties him to a set of train tracks, and tells him that the Guild will not submit, although his fate is left unknown. Dr. Z goes to Johnny's rehab clinic and they reminisce about their old battles. Dr. Mrs. The Monarch goes in her old costume with 21 to arch her nemesis, who turns out to be Didae. 21 convinces her to approach her and they reconcile. She later reveals to 21 that she stole Didae's wallet. Didae goes to meet Rusty, but he is so strung out on the antivenoms Brock dosed him with that he passes out. Post-credits scene: All of the councilmen except Wide Wale join the Council officially. When asked what her decision is, Dr. Mrs. The Monarch hesitates.
80	9	"The Forecast Manufacturer"	Juno Lee	Doc Hammer	September 30, 2018	709	0.604
New York is besieged by an unending blizzard, and the Guild tasks The Monarch and 21 with killing hoarder villain The Creep, who they believe stole a Guild weather machine and created it. He forces them to play lawn darts for their lives, but is distracted when Rusty and Billy come out of a stolen time machine (and Rusty addresses The Monarch as "Malcolm") and is killed by the dart. Rusty is tasked by the O.S.I. with destroying the machine, so he takes Billy to stop it, who pushes out a thermal suppository Rusty is having him test into the machine's vent. They discover that S-464 is operating the machine, who explains that he did it to get McManus's attention. Unable to get in touch with Sirena, Hank hikes across the city and hits his head on a street light. He is found by a mute person in a bloodstained bear costume, who carries him to Dean's dorm, where he finds Sirena cheating on him before passing out from his head wound. Post-credits scene: Dr. Mrs. The Monarch brings McManus to S-464, who detains her, his brain having been reprogrammed.
81	10	"The Saphrax Protocol"	Juno Lee	Doc Hammer	October 7, 2018	710	0.770
Dean tries to apologize to a comatose Hank by listing off the ways he has been a bad brother and admits he wants things to go back to normal. Hank awakens in a world that is a cross between The Empire Strikes Back and the film Barbarella, realizing it is purgatory. He meets the Action Man, who reveals that his mother's name is "Bobbi St. Simone". Phage, in a coma after his cybernetic parts injured him during a teleporter test, saves them from a wampa. Hank jumps into the Mathmos to escape. The Guild uses Rusty's teleporter to break into VenTech Tower and take Rusty to Meteor Majeure. They leave behind a squadron of soldiers to subdue Brock, who he gleefully massacres. The Council hosts The Monarch's level ten promotion ceremony on Meteor Majeure, where he and 21 are put through several tests. 21 is offered a villain role, and the Council gives The Monarch the choice to kill Rusty. Annoyed, he decries the rituals and 21 sides with him, only for the Council to reveal that the rejection was the final test. With Brock threatening to come through the teleporter if they do not send Rusty back, Watch and Ward go to fetch him, revealing in the process that they tested Rusty's blood and that he is related to The Monarch. Post-credits scene: Dean wakes up to learn that Hank has left the hospital, who vanishes into the crowd wearing his Batman mask, stating that "it's time I grow up."

=== Film (2023) ===
Title	Directed by	Written by	Original release date
Radiant Is the Blood of the Baboon Heart	Jackson Publick	Jackson Publick & Doc Hammer	July 21, 2023
A nationwide manhunt for Hank Venture leads to untold dangers and unexpected revelations, while The Monarch is literally out for Dr. Venture's blood. An imposing evil from the past reemerges to wreak havoc on the Ventures, The Guild, and even the Monarch marriage—it will take friends and foes alike to restore the Ventures' world to order... or end it once and for all.
