= Shut Up and Drive =

2007 single by Rihanna

Single by Rihanna

from the album Good Girl Gone Bad
- B-side: "Haunted"
- Released: June 12, 2007
- Recorded: 2006
- Studio: Sunwatch (Saint James, Barbados); The Loft Recording (Bronxville, New York)
- Genre: New wave
- Length: 3:33
- Label: Def Jam; SRP
- Songwriters: Evan Rogers; Carl Sturken; Stephen Morris; Peter Hook; Bernard Sumner; Gillian Gilbert
- Producers: Evan Rogers; Carl Sturken

Rihanna singles chronology
"Umbrella" (2007)	"Shut Up and Drive" (2007)	"Hate That I Love You" (2007)

Music video
- "Shut Up and Drive" on YouTube

"Shut Up and Drive" is a song by Barbadian singer Rihanna for her third studio album, Good Girl Gone Bad (2007). It was written and produced by Carl Sturken and Evan Rogers, and features an interpolation of the 1983 song "Blue Monday" by the British band New Order, whose members Bernard Sumner, Peter Hook, Stephen Morris, and Gillian Gilbert received songwriting credits. Released as the album's second single, the song was solicited to United States radio stations on June 12, 2007, and was physically released on August 27, 2007 in the United Kingdom. "Shut Up and Drive" is a new wave song which heavily incorporates 1970s and 1980s musical styles. Lyrically, it contains multiple references to cars and car parts including the '57 Cadillac.

"Shut Up and Drive" was received with mixed reviews from music critics, who labeled its lyrics as fluffy and goofy. The song peaked at number 15 on the US Billboard Hot 100 chart and at number one on the US Dance Club Songs chart. On the UK Singles Chart, it reached number five, becoming Rihanna's fifth top-five single. "Shut Up and Drive" peaked within the top 10 in nine other countries, including in Australia, Canada, Germany and Italy. Its accompanying music video was directed by Anthony Mandler and was shot in several places in the Czech Republic, such as airship hangar in Příbram or junkyard in Sluštice near Prague. It features Rihanna in a makeshift junkyard. Rihanna performed "Shut Up and Drive" on the Good Girl Gone Bad (2007–09), Last Girl on Earth (2010–11) and Loud (2011) concert tours.

== Production and release ==
"Shut Up and Drive" was produced by Carl Sturken and Evan Rogers, and its composition is credited to Sturken and Rogers as well as the members of New Order (Bernard Sumner, Peter Hook, Stephen Morris and Gillian Gilbert), whose 1983 song "Blue Monday" forms a partial basis for the song. Al Hemberger recorded the song at Sunwatch in Saint James, Barbados and The Loft Recording Studios in Bronxville, New York. Hemberger also served as a mixing engineer and mixed "Shut Up and Drive" at The Loft Recording Studios, together with mixing assistant Roy Matthews. Sturken provided all of the instrumentation while Rihanna and Rogers sang the background vocals. The production manager of the song was Rob Heselden with Christie Moran serving as a production assistant. "Shut Up and Drive" was released as the second single from the album, following the worldwide chart-topper "Umbrella" (featuring Jay-Z). The song premiered on Tuesday, May 22, 2007, on Rihanna's official website. It was originally scheduled to be released to contemporary hit radio in the United States on June 5, 2007. However, it was postponed to the next week. It was also sent to rhythmic contemporary radio on June 19, 2007. The single was later released as a CD single on August 27, 2007, in the UK.

== Music and lyrics ==
'Shut Up and Drive'
A 21-second sample from the chorus of the song, which samples British new wave group New Order's 1983 song "Blue Monday" and heavily incorporates 1970s and 1980s music styles.

"Shut Up and Drive" is a new wave song that incorporates influences of the 1970s and 1980s musical styles. It interpolates New Order's 1983 single "Blue Monday". The song contains an upbeat opening sequence with a heavy guitar riff. Tom Breihan from Pitchfork Media wrote that the song "begins with über-processed new wave guitars that sort of sound like the Cars". Lyrically, "Shut Up and Drive", as the title suggests, is about Rihanna looking for a "driver", having nothing to do with the cars' performance described being thinly veiled metaphors for her and the driver as for a lover capable to handle them. The lyrics also contain multiple references to various cars and car parts, including 'class like a '57 Cadillac', all about her own attributes.

== Critical reception ==
"Shut Up and Drive" received mixed reviews from contemporary music critics. Bill Lamb from About.com commented that there are better songs on Good Girl Gone Bad, but "Shut Up and Drive" captures "the spirit of summer just as well as Rihanna's first hit 'Pon de Replay'". Lamb further continued, "The lyrics are pure fluff, and the vocals have the now familiar thin and reedy quality common to many of Rihanna's efforts. However, like any successful sports car, the look, feel, and speed of 'Shut Up and Drive' pull you in despite the model's shortcomings." Quentin B. Huff from PopMatters wrote that "Shut Up and Drive" is a sassier version of Aretha Franklin's "Freeway of Love" and Michael Jackson's "Speed Demon". He also stated that the song would have fit comfortably on Gwen Stefani's 2004 first album Love. Angel. Music Baby. Sal Cinquemani from Slant Magazine found that the song did not live up to its campy title, while Rodney Dugue from The Village Voice described it as simultaneously "goofy and sexually daring". Andy Kellman from AllMusic also referred to it as "a sleek, forthcoming proposition...as undeniable and rocking as Sugababes' 2002 UK smash 'Freak Like Me'". "Shut Up and Drive" won Most Popular R&B Song at the 34th People's Choice Awards.

== Chart performance ==
"Shut Up and Drive" debuted at number 88 on the US Billboard Hot 100, and peaked at number 15 several weeks later, failing to match the success of Rihanna's previous single "Umbrella". The song reached number one on the US Dance Club Songs, becoming Rihanna's sixth number-one song on that chart. "Shut Up and Drive" peaked at number 11 on the US Billboard Pop Songs and became Rihanna's seventh top 20 single on that chart. The song was certified platinum by the Recording Industry Association of America (RIAA) for shipment of over 1,000,000 copies. "Shut Up and Drive" reached the top 10 on the Canadian Hot 100, peaking at number six. "Shut Up and Drive" debuted on the UK Singles Chart on July 28, 2007, at number 65. After six weeks, the song peaked at number five and became Rihanna's fifth UK top 10 single. It stayed on the UK Singles Chart for 31 weeks, becoming her sixth longest charting song there. "Shut Up and Drive" has sold more than 230,000 copies in the UK.

In mainland Europe, the song achieved moderate success. It peaked in the top 10 in eight other countries including Hungary, the Republic of Ireland, Germany and Italy. In Switzerland and Sweden, the song reached number 14 and number 31, respectively. "Shut Up and Drive" debuted and peaked at number four on the Australian Singles Chart, becoming the album's second top five single there. "Shut Up and Drive" was certified 4× Platinum by Australian Recording Industry Association (ARIA) for 280,000 equivalents units. The song peaked at number 12 on the New Zealand Singles Chart and charted for 13 consecutive weeks.

== Promotion ==
=== Music video ===
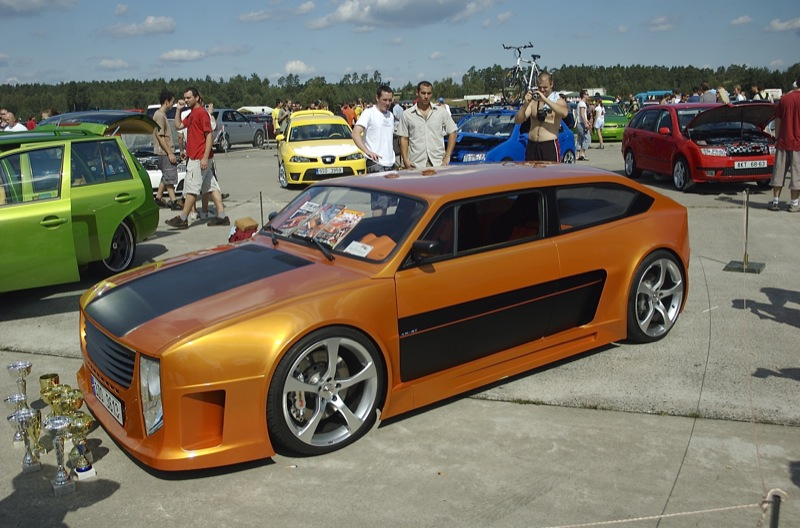
Škoda Rapid used in the video

Rihanna filmed the music video for "Shut Up and Drive" in an airship hangar in Příbram and in a makeshift junkyard placed in Sluštice, the Czech Republic. It was directed by Anthony Mandler, who directed the videos for Rihanna's 2006 singles "Unfaithful" and "We Ride". The video was officially released on the iTunes Store on June 25, 2007. It begins with Rihanna driving a Ferrari to a junkyard. As she enters the junkyard, the song begins. Many girls are repairing broken cars and Rihanna joins them while singing the song. Other scenes, showing Rihanna dancing on a car, are intercut. As the video progresses, Rihanna and the girls get out from the junkyard and go to a race stage. Then, she sings the song's lyrics to the drivers. Later, she becomes a car race starter and on her sign, both drivers begin their race. Scenes of Rihanna climbing on a navigate stair are shown. Near the end of the video, Rihanna dances and sings the song on a microphone together with her band, while wearing a black dress with white stars.

=== Live performances ===
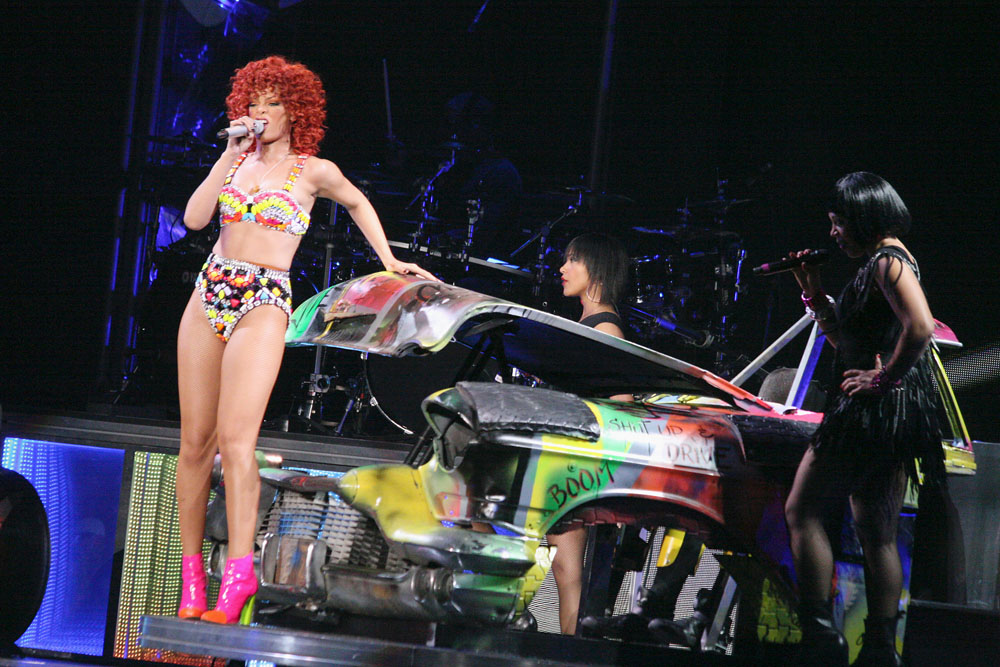
Rihanna performing "Shut Up and Drive" on the Loud Tour (2011)

Since its release, "Shut Up and Drive" has regularly been featured in Rihanna's live performances and tours. She performed the song for first time at the BBC Radio 1's Big Weekend on May 21, 2007, held in Preston, United Kingdom together with "Umbrella" and "Breakin' Dishes". Rihanna performed "Shut Up and Drive" at the 2007 MTV Video Music Awards held at The Palms in Las Vegas. For the performance, she was joined by American rock band Fall Out Boy. In late December 2007, Rihanna was the guest star at the Late Show with David Letterman, where she gave a performance of "Shut Up and Drive".

She also performed it at the 2009 Super Bowl, which was held at the Pepsi Center in Denver, Colorado. According to Gil Kaufman from MTV, the performance featured "a chair dance, lots of funky wah-wah and screaming guitar solos, and graphics of spinning rims and neon speed gauges on the mega screens". Rihanna performed "Shut Up and Drive" on her three major tours: Good Girl Gone Bad (2007–09), Last Girl on Earth (2010–11) and the Loud Tour (2011). The performances of the song on the Last Girl on Earth and the Loud Tour shows, featured a car present on the stage. In a review of one of the shows from the Loud Tour, Jonathan McCambridge from Belfast Telegraph commented about the performance, "'During Shut Up And Drive', a car appeared from underneath the stage and a number of dancers then proceeded to pretend to batter the hell out of it for no obvious reason."

== Usage in media ==
"Shut Up and Drive" is featured on the soundtrack of the 2012 Disney film Wreck-It Ralph, playing over the scene in which Ralph (John C. Reilly) teaches Vanellope von Schweetz (Sarah Silverman) to drive in the arcade game Sugar Rush. The song is also featured in 2008 movies College Road Trip, 21, and Wild Child. It was used in 2012 commercials for cars from the Japanese automobile maker Mazda.

The song was later used as a "Lip Sync for your Life" song in "Revenge of the Queens", a season 2 episode of RuPaul's Drag Race All Stars in 2016. Contestants Tatianna and Alyssa Edwards performed this song for a chance to re-enter the competition; since both performed exceptionally well, they both got to return. This has frequently been rated the number one best Drag Race lip-sync performance.

== Cover versions ==
The song was covered by the rock band Weep on their 2010 album Worn Thin. Ned Raggett of AllMusic praised Weep's interpretation in his review of Worn Thin, calling it a "revelation, turning the machine pop of one style into another with ease".

== Track listings ==
- German CD single
1. "Shut Up and Drive" (Radio Edit) – 3:32
2. "Haunted" – 4:08
- UK CD single
1. "Shut Up and Drive" (Radio Edit) – 3:32
2. "Shut Up and Drive" (The Wideboys Club Mix) – 6:36
- Japanese CD single
1. "Shut Up and Drive" (Radio Edit) – 3:37
2. "Hate That I Love You" (featuring Ne-Yo) – 3:40
- European maxi single
1. "Shut Up and Drive" (Radio Edit) – 3:32
2. "Shut Up and Drive" (The Wideboys Club Mix) – 6:34
3. "Shut Up and Drive" (Instrumental) – 3:32
4. "Shut Up and Drive" (Video)
- 12-inch picture disc
1. "Shut Up and Drive" (The Wideboys Club Mix) – 6:34
2. "Shut Up and Drive" (Radio Edit) – 3:32
3. "Shut Up and Drive" (Instrumental) – 3:32

== Credits and personnel ==
Credits are adapted from the liner notes of Good Girl Gone Bad.

Locations

- Recorded at Sunwatch, Saint James, Barbados and The Loft Recording Studios, Bronxville, New York
- Mixed at The Loft Recording Studios

Personnel

- Songwriting – Carl Sturken, Evan Rogers
- Sample – Contains elements from "Blue Monday" written by Bernard Sumner, Peter Hook, Stephen Morris, Gillian Gilbert
- Production – Carl Sturken and Evan Rogers
- Recording – Al Hemberger
- Mixing – Al Hemberger
- Mixing assistant – Roy Matthews
- Instrumentation (electric guitar, keyboards, drum machine Roland TR-808, electric bass, sounds) – Carl Sturken
- Background vocals – Rihanna, Evan Rogers
- Production manager – Rob Heselden
- Production assistant – Christie Moran

== Charts ==
=== Weekly charts ===
Weekly chart performance for "Shut Up and Drive"
Chart (2007–2008)	Peak position
Australia (ARIA)	4
Austria (Ö3 Austria Top 40)	31
Belgium (Ultratop 50 Flanders)	9
Belgium (Ultratop 50 Wallonia)	12
Canada Hot 100 (Billboard)	6
CIS Airplay (TopHit)	58
Croatia International Airplay (HRT)	5
Czech Republic Airplay (ČNS IFPI)	28
Denmark (Tracklisten)	33
Europe (European Hot 100 Singles)	16
Finland (Suomen virallinen lista)	3
Germany (GfK)	6
Greece (IFPI)	5
Hungary (Rádiós Top 40)	4
Hungary (Dance Top 40)	16
Hungary (Single Top 40)	10
Ireland (IRMA)	5
Italy (FIMI)	8
Mexico Anglo (Monitor Latino)	11
Netherlands (Dutch Top 40)	5
Netherlands (Single Top 100)	7
New Zealand (Recorded Music NZ)	12
Norway (VG-lista)	13
Scottish Singles Sales (Official Charts)	7
Slovakia Airplay (ČNS IFPI)	8
Sweden (Sverigetopplistan)	31
Switzerland (Schweizer Hitparade)	14
UK Singles (Official Charts)	5
UK Hip Hop/R&B (Official Charts)	2
US Billboard Hot 100	15
US Adult Pop Airplay (Billboard)	33
US Dance Club Songs (Billboard)	1
US Pop Airplay (Billboard)	11

=== Year-end charts ===
2007 year-end chart performance for "Shut Up and Drive"
Chart (2007)	Position
Australia (ARIA)	44
Belgium (Ultratop 50 Flanders)	76
Belgium (Ultratop 50 Wallonia)	71
Europe (European Hot 100 Singles)	77
Hungary (Rádiós Top 40)	56
Netherlands (Dutch Top 40)	32
Netherlands (Single Top 100)	55
UK Singles (OCC)	32
US Billboard Hot 100	90

2008 year-end chart performance for "Shut Up and Drive"
Chart (2008)	Position
Germany (Media Control GfK)	68
Hungary (Rádiós Top 40)	49

== Certifications ==
Certifications for "Shut Up and Drive"
Region	Certification	Certified units/sales
Australia (ARIA)	4× Platinum	280,000^{‡}
Brazil (Pro-Música Brasil)	3× Platinum	180,000^{‡}
Denmark (IFPI Danmark)	2× Platinum	180,000^{‡}
Germany (BVMI)	Gold	150,000^{‡}
New Zealand (RMNZ)	2× Platinum	60,000^{‡}
United Kingdom (BPI)	Platinum	600,000^{‡}
United States (RIAA)	3× Platinum	3,000,000^{‡}
^{‡} Sales+streaming figures based on certification alone.

== Release history ==
Release dates and formats for "Shut Up and Drive"
Region	Date	Format(s)	Label(s)	Ref.
United States	June 12, 2007	Contemporary hit radio	Def Jam; Island	
United States	June 19, 2007	Rhythmic contemporary radio	Def Jam; Island Def Jam	
United Kingdom	August 27, 2007	CD; picture disc	Mercury	
Australia	September 3, 2007	CD	Universal	
Germany	February 29, 2008	CD	Universal	

== See also ==
- List of Billboard Hot Dance Club Play number ones of 2007
