= Worn Thin =

Studio album by Weep
- Released: July 13, 2010
- Genre: Ethereal wave, gothic rock, shoegazing
- Length: 46:33
- Label: Projekt (PRO00243)
- Producer: Doc Hammer

Weep chronology
Never Ever (2008)	Worn Thin (2010)	6 Interpretations (2010)

Worn Thin is the debut album by the New York City rock band Weep, released July 13, 2010 through Projekt Records. It includes a remix of the song "Ever Shy" from the band's 2008 debut EP Never Ever, as well as cover versions of Jesus Jones' "Right Here, Right Now" and Rihanna's "Shut Up and Drive".

== Background ==
Weep was formed in 2008 by multi-disciplinary artist Eric "Doc" Hammer, previously of the gothic rock bands Requiem in White and Mors Syphilitica, together with keyboard player Alex Dziena, bass guitarist Fred Macaraeg, and drummer Bill Kovalcik. The band released their debut EP, Never Ever that year through Hammer's Astro-Base Go company, and distributed it through his former label Projekt Records.

For Worn Thin the band strove for a high production value to the tracks, an approach Hammer described as "almost like a reactionary antidote to what we're sick of in music. That dry, low-tech production of the past ten years is tiring. It's in its footy pajamas, and it needs to take a nap. We wanted something lush and dramatic for the songs on Worn Thin. They usually relegate that kinda over-the-top production to Lady Gaga. But believe me, it works really well with a messy little band like Weep." To this end the band incorporated additional elements into the songs, including multi-part vocal harmonies and string and horn sections:

It was fun pushing these songs to a place that most bands would feel goofy pushing them to. The vocals have three- and even four-part harmonies, which for a guy with my brass pipes, is no small feat. And we have string and horn sections that push the material right over the cliff. But at the same time, when we approached the guitar-heavy songs, we backed off all the bells and cranked up the amps. I guess we just took each song on its own and did everything in our power to present it the way we heard it in our heads.

== Critical reception ==
Professional ratings
Review scores
Source	Rating
Allmusic	3.5/5 stars
Revolt	4/5 stars

Critical reaction to Worn Thin was generally positive. Ned Raggett of Allmusic drew comparisons to post-punk, new wave, gothic rock, shoegazing, and indie rock acts including Echo & the Bunnymen, Kitchens of Distinction, Interpol, and Siouxsie and the Banshees, calling it "one of those efforts that draws on bands more adopted by [gothic rock] fans rather than necessarily being that way in the first place." He remarked that Hammer's "dry, demi-robot-like vocals ease the kick of the songs, a calm passion that suggests changing moods without acting them out to the full." He criticized a "relative sameness" of the songs that caused them to blend together, but complemented the band's cover version of "Shut Up and Drive" as "a revelation, turning the machine pop of one style into another with ease." Michael Toland of The Big Takeover detected influences of The Psychedelic Furs, New Order, The Cure, The Comsat Angels, and Cocteau Twins in the album, saying that "it sounds like Hammer created this record under the influence of several hours of 120 Minutes, circa the mid-'80s." He noted, however, that "this is no nostalgia trip. Ringing guitars, lush synth beds and soaring melodies evoke a certain era, but Hammer's husky croon – barely above a mutter – subdues any note of melodrama."

Less Lee Moore of Popshifter complemented the instrumentation on Worn Thin, particularly the synthesizer melodies which he found very effective in evoking subtle emotions. He also praised Hammer's singing, saying that "One might think that in the midst of all this lush, exquisite beauty, Doc Hammer's gravelly, robotic voice might seem anachronistic, but the contrapuntal effect is actually quite perfect. His singing is higher in the mix than it was on Never Ever and the songs are better for it." He summarized the album as "compelling proof that Weep is not some group of hipster New Wave wannabes, but a band that deserves your attention." Greg Heaney of the online magazine Revolt gave Worn Thin four stars out of five, remarking that "The songs have a lushness to them that makes the album deceptively easy to get lost in", and calling it "an incredibly rich and warm listening experience". Noting Hammer's roots in Dark Wave music, he commented that "With layered, wistful vocals and spacey synthesizers, Weep pays tribute to the bands that have helped to shape the genre while delivering an experience that is uniquely theirs." Chris Dahlberg of Cosmos Gaming identified elements of Dark Wave music in Worn Thin and remarked that the interplay of keyboard and guitar melodies added texture to the album. He described Hammer's singing voice as "smooth and relaxing [...] a perfect fit for Weep's dreamy instrumental arrangements. While he doesn’t vary his pitch as much as he does in his voice acting, the style that he does use is very strong".

== Track listing ==
All tracks are written by Doc Hammer, except where noted.

No.	Title	Length
1.	"Snow Scenery"	4:01
2.	"Let Me"	4:01
3.	"When I'm Wrong"	4:34
4.	"A Reminder"	3:46
5.	"The Time I Thought That"	3:46
6.	"Over Now"	4:05
7.	"Calm Down"	3:52
8.	"Ever Shy" (Nov. mix)	4:05
9.	"Worn Thin"	3:25
10.	"Interlude"	3:59
11.	"Right Here, Right Now" (written by Mike Edwards and originally performed by Jesus Jones)	3:24
12.	"Shut Up and Drive" (written by Carl Sturken and Evan Rogers and originally performed by Rihanna; contains an interpretation of "Blue Monday", written by Bernard Sumner, Peter Hook, Stephen Morris, and Gillian Gilbert and originally performed by New Order)	3:35
Total length:		46:33

== Personnel ==
- Doc Hammer – guitar, vocals, producer, recording engineer, mastering, artwork
- Fred Macaraeg – bass guitar
- Alex Dziena – keyboards
- Bill Kovalcik – drums
