= 6 Interpretations =

EP by Weep
- Released: 2010
- Genre: Dance, synthpop
- Length: 26:44
- Label: Projekt (PRO00249)
- Producer: Doc Hammer

Weep chronology
Worn Thin (2010)	6 Interpretations (2010)

6 Interpretations is an EP by the New York City rock band Weep consisting of remixed versions of songs from their 2008 debut EP Never Ever and their 2010 debut album Worn Thin. It was released in 2010 through Projekt Records. Singer, guitarist, and songwriter Doc Hammer remarked on the oddity of the gothic rock and shoegaze band producing a dance record:

I had no idea that this would work as well as it did. I mean, we're not a huge fans of dance music. I guess that's what made us want to do this; a rock band that loves the old Tommy Boy Records sound, and loves old Depeche Mode and stuff like that are probably the best candidates for making a unique dance recording. Ya know? We got nothing to lose! Nobody expects us to do this.

== Track listing ==
All tracks are written by Doc Hammer.

No.	Title	Length
1.	"Lay There and Drown" (Salvation mix)	4:33
2.	"Snow Scenery" (Party mix)	4:01
3.	"When I'm Wrong" (Newer Wave mix)	4:57
4.	"A Reminder" (Funhouse mix)	4:33
5.	"The Hole" (Club mix)	3:32
6.	"The Weep" (Prom Theme)	5:08
Total length:		26:44

== Personnel ==
- Doc Hammer – guitar, vocals, producer, re-recording, remixing
- Fred Macaraeg – bass guitar
- Alex Dziena – keyboards
- Bill Kovalcik – drums
