= Never Ever (Weep EP) =

EP by Weep
- Released: 2008
- Genre: Ethereal wave, gothic rock, shoegazing, post-punk
- Length: 30:22
- Label: Astro-Base Go (AST04359), Projekt
- Producer: Doc Hammer

Weep chronology
Never Ever (2008)	Worn Thin (2010)

Never Ever is the debut EP by the New York City rock band Weep, released in 2008 through Astro-Base Go Recordings and distributed by Projekt Records.

== Background ==
Prior to forming Weep, Eric "Doc" Hammer had performed in the gothic rock acts Requiem in White from 1985 to 1995 and Mors Syphilitica from 1995 to 2002, both with his then-wife Lisa Hammer on vocals. Over the next several years he continued to write music, while also working as a writer and voice actor on the animated television series The Venture Bros. beginning in 2004. In 2008 he was approached by keyboard player Alex Dziena with the idea of starting a new band to perform songs Hammer had written. Dziena recruited bassist Fred Macaraeg and drummer Bill Kovalcik for the project, and the group began rehearsing. Hammer played guitar and sang, a departure from his previous acts which had featured operatic female vocals. He was initially unsure of his vocal abilities, but took on the duty despite this. Never Ever was produced and mastered by Hammer and released in 2008 through Astro-Base Go, his animation company with Venture Bros. co-writer Christopher McCulloch, and distributed by his former label Projekt Records.

== Critical reception ==
Professional ratings
Review scores
Source	Rating
Liarsociety	4.5/5 stars
View from Heaven	8.7/10

Critical response to Never Ever was generally positive. Less Lee Moore of Popshifter remarked that fans of Hammer's work on The Venture Bros. "[would] be wrong to pretend to like Never Ever simply because Doc Hammer has a terrific sense of humor. Those fans will probably be quite surprised to find they like it because it's actually a good album." He noted the influence of post-punk, shoegazing, gothic rock, and new wave acts such as My Bloody Valentine, The Sisters of Mercy, Cocteau Twins, The Cure, and Modern English in the songs. He praised Kovalcik's drum sound and Hammer's vocals, describing the latter as "gravelly", "ragged", "wistful", "robotic", and "detached", drawing a comparison to Daniel Ash. Jack Shear of Liarsociety gave the EP four and a half out of five stars, noting the distinction between Weep and Hammer's past projects: "Whereas Requiem in White and Mors Syphilitica both relied upon layers of sound as the backdrop for operatic female vocals, Weep focuses on a driving combination of gothic rock and shoegaze sensibilities and features Hammer’s own reverberating, understated vocals. Never Ever shows the influence of 80s post-punk, but has enough subtle embellishments to make this more than a retread." Jared Weiss of View from Heaven remarked that the "dark tone and fuzzy sound" of the music worked well with Hammer's vocals, and named "Lay There and Drown" and "Su Promesa" as highlights of the EP.

== Track listing ==
All tracks are written by Doc Hammer.

No.	Title	Length
1.	"Lay There and Drown"	3:24
2.	"The Hole"	3:14
3.	"One Lock, One Key"	3:33
4.	"The Wanting House"	3:28
5.	"Ever Shy"	3:50
6.	"Su Promesa"	3:52
7.	"Can't Be True"	4:41
8.	"The Weep"	4:20
Total length:		30:22

== Personnel ==
- Doc Hammer – guitar, vocals, producer, mastering
- Fred Macaraeg – bass guitar
- Alex Dziena – keyboards
- Bill Kovalcik – drums
