= Weep (band) =

American rock band

- Origin: New York City
- Genres: Ethereal wave, gothic rock, shoegaze, synthpop
- Years active: 2008–present
- Labels: Astro-Base Go, Projekt, Organs of Generation
- Members: Doc Hammer; Fred Macaraeg; Alex Dziena; Bill Kovalcik

Weep is an American rock band from New York City whose music combines elements of ethereal wave, gothic rock, shoegaze, post-punk and synthpop. Formed in 2008 by singer and guitarist Doc Hammer (formerly of Requiem in White and Mors Syphilitica, and writer and voice actor for the animated television series The Venture Bros.), the band's lineup also includes bass guitarist Fred Macaraeg, keyboardist Alex Dziena and drummer Bill Kovalcik. Their debut EP, Never Ever, was released in 2008 by Hammer's Astro-Base Go company and Projekt Records, followed by the full-length albums Worn Thin (2010), Alate (2012) and Weep (2014).

Weep's music has been described as dark and expansive, with "shimmering guitars and spacy synthesizers". Hammer's singing voice has been noted for its gravelly, robotic qualities which provide a counterpoint to the lush song arrangements. Critics have compared the band to a number of post-punk, alternative rock and shoegaze acts of the 1980s and 1990s.

== History ==
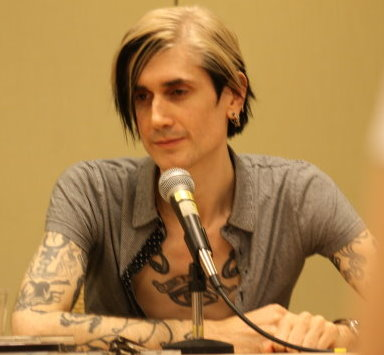
Multi-disciplinary artist Doc Hammer is the guitarist, singer and songwriter of Weep.

Prior to forming Weep, Hammer had performed in the gothic rock acts Requiem in White (from 1985 to 1995) and Mors Syphilitica (from 1995 to 2002), both with his then-wife Lisa Hammer on vocals. Over the next several years, he continued to write music, while also working as a writer and voice actor on the animated television series The Venture Bros., beginning in 2004.

In 2008, Hammer was approached by Dziena with the idea of starting a new band to perform songs Hammer had written. "[Starting Weep] was a fucking accident", said Hammer in 2009, "there was never supposed to be a Weep, I was just writing songs, because I do it habitually. My keyboard player that I had been in a band with previously called me up and asked what I was doing. I told him I was just writing my own shit, just to entertain myself, because it's what I do. And he was like... 'let's make a band'". Dziena recruited bassist Macaraeg and drummer Kovalcik for the project, and the group began rehearsing. Hammer took on singing duties, a departure from his previous acts, which had featured operatic female vocals. He said: "I didn't know I was going to fucking sing... I can't fucking sing. I didn't care, I just wanted to write this crap".

Weep's debut EP, Never Ever, was released in 2008 by Astro-Base Go, the animation company of Hammer and Venture Bros. co-writer Jackson Publick, and distributed by Hammer's former label, Projekt. The full-length album Worn Thin was released in July 2010 on Projekt, followed by 6 Interpretations, an EP of remixes. "Weep has just become something that I am really interested in," Hammer remarked, regarding the direction of the band. "I think it's a band of people that are capable of making a really good record. No one in the band cares about the things that ruin albums: we don't care about being popular, we don't care about being part of the zeitgeist, we don't care about sounding like another band, we just want to do our own weird thing".

In January 2011, Weep released a digital single for "Lay There and Drown" and "The Hole", two songs from Never Ever that Hammer remixed, remastered, and re-recorded some vocal parts for. The following month, on Valentine's Day, the band gave away a free music download of a cover version of Bauhaus' 1981 single "The Passion of Lovers". Weep's second album, Alate, was released August 28, 2012 by Projekt. Their third, self-titled album was released in 2014 on the Organs of Generation label.

== Musical style ==
Weep's music combines elements of ethereal wave, shoegaze, synthpop, gothic rock, post-punk, indie rock and new wave. Gregory Heaney of AllMusic described their sound as "dark and expansive, envelop[ing] the listener in a warm blanket of shimmering guitars and spacy synthesizers, setting them adrift while still maintaining enough drive to feel like substantial rock songs". Hammer's singing is noted for being gravelly and robotic but also relaxing and wistful, providing a counterpoint to the lush song arrangements. The band has drawn comparisons to Echo & the Bunnymen, Kitchens of Distinction, Interpol, Siouxsie and the Banshees, David Bowie, Roxy Music, Air, My Bloody Valentine, the Sisters of Mercy, Cocteau Twins, the Cure, Modern English, the Psychedelic Furs, New Order, the Comsat Angels and Placebo.

== Personnel ==
- Doc Hammer – guitar, vocals
- Fred Macaraeg – bass guitar
- Alex Dziena – keyboards
- Bill Kovalcik – drums

== Discography ==
=== Studio albums ===
- Worn Thin (2010, Projekt)
- Alate (2012, Projekt)
- Weep (2014, Organs of Generation)
- Too Much Nothing (2021, self-released)
- Romantic Tales of Paraplegia (2024, Organs of Generation)

=== Singles and EPs ===
- Never Ever EP (2008, Astro-Base Go)
- 6 Interpretations EP (2010, Projekt)
- "Lay There and Drown" / "The Hole" digital single (2011, Projekt)
- "The Passion of Lovers" digital single (2011, Projekt)
- Songs Nobody Wanted Us to Cover EP (2020, self-released)
