= The Venture Bros.: Radiant Is the Blood of the Baboon Heart =

2023 film directed by Jackson Publick

- Directed by: Jackson Publick
- Screenplay by: Jackson Publick; Doc Hammer
- Based on: The Venture Bros. by Jackson Publick
- Produced by: Rachel Simon
- Starring: James Urbaniak; Patrick Warburton; Michael Sinterniklaas; Chris McCulloch; Doc Hammer
- Music by: JG Thirlwell
- Production companies: Williams Street; Astro Base GO!; Titmouse, Inc.; ShadowMachine Films (co-production)
- Distributed by: Warner Bros. Home Entertainment
- Release dates: July 21, 2023 (Digital); July 25, 2023 (Blu-ray)
- Running time: 84 minutes
- Country: United States
- Language: English

The Venture Bros.: Radiant Is the Blood of the Baboon Heart is a 2023 American direct-to-video adult animated science fiction action adventure film based on the Adult Swim animated series The Venture Bros., where it serves as the series finale. The film is directed and co-written by the series creator Jackson Publick and writer Doc Hammer, who serve as the film's executive producers and features the voices of the show's returning principal cast, James Urbaniak, Patrick Warburton, Michael Sinterniklaas, Publick and Hammer. The film centers on a nationwide manhunt for Hank Venture, which leads to a coming darkness from the past that involves the Venture Family, the Guild, and the Monarch.

Originally envisioned as a potential eighth season of the series, the film is the second of Adult Swim's line of direct-to-video movies after Aqua Teen Forever: Plantasm, and was released by Warner Bros. Home Entertainment on digital on July 21, 2023, and Blu-ray on July 25, 2023, followed by its availability on HBO Max 90 days later.

== Plot ==
Three days after Hank's disappearance, the O.S.I. is distracted with a low-level Guild villain attacking one of their labs with technology supplied by the mysterious new villain organization ARCH. The Council of Thirteen assigns Dr. Mrs. The Monarch and Red Death to investigate. The Monarch, after his Guild initiation reveals via DNA test that they are seemingly related, is forbidden from attacking Dr. Venture until their relationship is confirmed. Meanwhile, Dr. Venture struggles with perfecting VenTech's newest invention, the "HelperPod" virtual assistant, due to a bug that makes it levitate while playing music.

Driven by guilt over sleeping with Hank's girlfriend, Dean goes to Orpheus for help, and they set off, with Jefferson, to find him. Acting on advice from his imaginings of various characters he enjoys playing (The Detective, The Bat, Russian Guyovich, and Enrico Matassa), Hank returns to his old family home at the Venture compound to rediscover himself. The Monarch is approached by his ex-girlfriend and ARCH's invisible leader Mantilla, who promises to let him arch Dr. Venture again if he joins them. Upon his arrival at the abandoned Venture compound, Hank encounters his old friend and O.S.I. cadet Dermott, who found a picture of "Bobbi St. Simone" signed to Dr. Venture amongst his collection of stolen Venture memorabilia.

During a detour, Jefferson is attacked by blaculas in Chicago, where Dean is seemingly bitten by one and tries to hide it. Dr. Mrs. The Monarch is framed as ARCH's leader and blacklisted by the Guild, but Red Death helps her escape. The Monarch and 21 are abandoned by ARCH upon breaking in to VenTech Tower, while Mantilla uses 21's phone to hack into the HelperPods and use their levitating bug to uproot the tower, sending them into orbit. Hank arrives at Bobbi's animal sanctuary, who explains that she had a brief tryst with Jonas after he gave her invisibility powers for a movie. She was later recruited by the O.S.I. as a Guild mole, but fell in love with the Guild's leader Force Majeure and had a daughter, Mantilla. The two were later forced to flee and went into hiding after The Sovereign killed Majeure for Guild leadership. Hank, overwhelmed by his head injury, falls back into purgatory.

Billy and Pete advise Rusty to individually destroy the HelperPods to slowly lower the tower back to earth. He, Hatred, The Monarch, and 21 are nearly killed by their gravitational field when they try, forcing them to hide in the air ducts. Dr. Mrs. The Monarch breaks into Mantilla's apartment, where she is waiting for her and explains that she wants to run ARCH with her out of admiration. She mentions that Dr. Venture had transferred her mother's invisibility to her in exchange for her eggs (implying that she is technically Hank and Dean's biological mother) and that she is the rightful heir to the Guild. She turns off the HelperPods in exchange for Guild immunity, causing the tower to start falling at a lethal speed. Orpheus comes to purgatory to rescue Hank, who is moved by the fact that Dean is the one who led his rescue.

Dean accidentally transports himself to purgatory and is attacked by the physical manifestations of Hank's characters. Orpheus pulls them both out and Hank finally forgives his brother. Hatred discovers the Ventronic mech inside the tower as they reenter the atmosphere, and the team devises a plan to slow the building's descent. They marginally slow the tower using Ventronic, though The Monarch accidentally ejects his part of the robot in the process. Aided by Hunter Gathers and the O.S.I.'s mothership, Ventronic safely lowers the tower into the ruins of the compound, while The Monarch is impaled by the fallen statue of Jonas after leaving the arm. Dean nervously reveals his bite to Jefferson, who explains that he merely injured himself on Jefferson's tooth necklace when he tackled Dean to safety.

Ben arrives on the scene and saves The Monarch's life by using Dr. Venture's blood for a transfusion, and Ben reveals that they are not related: Monarch—-like Doctor Venture—-is a clone of the original Rusty Venture, infused with minor traces of baboon DNA (to combat premature baldness) which caused his extreme aggression. The Fitzcarraldo family adopted Monarch as they could not have children of their own. Ben gives Hank a custom GMT Master, given to him by Jonas before Dr. Venture was born. Ben makes note of the engraving on the back, Elige Tua (choose your family), telling Hank that "blood doesn't make a family, love does", while Dr. Venture promises Dean that whoever "gave birth to him" loves him. A weakened Monarch declares his determination to hate Dr. Venture and leaves in triumph. Later, in a flashback montage, a young Dr. Venture reveals Hank and Dean to H.E.L.P.eR., who are growing in an artificial womb attached to his chest.

== Cast ==
- James Urbaniak as Dr. Thaddeus "Rusty" Venture, Phantom Limb
- Patrick Warburton as Brock Samson
- Michael Sinterniklaas as Dean Venture
- Chris McCulloch as Hank Venture, The Monarch, Sgt. Hatred, Pete White, Gen. Hunter Gathers, H.E.L.P.eR., Colonel Gentleman, The Action Man, The Pirate Captain, Dragoon, Dr. Z, Watch
- Doc Hammer as Dr. Mrs. The Monarch, Henchman 21, Billy Quizboy, Dermott, Shore Leave, Red Mantle, Ward
- Nina Arianda as Mantilla
- Clancy Brown as Red Death
- John Hodgman as Snoopy
- Hal Lublin as Clayton
- Jane Lynch as Bobbi St. Simone
- Charles Parnell as Jefferson Twilight
- Jay Pharoah as Nuno Blood
- J.K. Simmons as Ben
- Steven Rattazzi as Dr. Orpheus
- Dana Snyder as The Alchemist

== Production ==
After the conclusion of the seventh season in October 2018, the series was announced to be renewed for an eighth season. On September 5, 2020, one of the show's illustrators, Ken Plume, tweeted that The Venture Bros. was cancelled. Jackson Publick confirmed two days later that the show was cancelled. The script for Season 8 had been partially written at the time of its cancellation a few months before the public announcement.

Following the announcement, Adult Swim stated via Twitter that "We also want more Venture Bros. and have been working with Jackson and Doc to find another way to continue the Venture Bros. story". On November 13, 2020, HBO Max general manager Andy Forssell tweeted that HBO Max was "working on" reviving The Venture Bros. On May 12, 2021, it was announced that a direct-to-video film was greenlit for production from Adult Swim, which will conclude the story from the series, and air on HBO Max 90 days after its home video release. In April 2023, it was announced that HBO Max would re-launch as Max on May 23 that year.

Production for the film was finished in March 2023.

== Release ==
Radiant Is the Blood of the Baboon Heart was made available on digital platforms July 21, 2023 and released on Blu-ray on July 25.

=== Reception ===
The film received highly positive reviews from critics and audiences. On review aggregator website Rotten Tomatoes, the film holds an 92% approval rating based on reviews from 12 critics, with an average rating of 7.8/10. Nick Valdez of ComicBook.com said that the film was an "emotional finale" to the series, stating that "It's the kind of ending that leaves you wanting more. Not because the film itself was lacking, but because it leaves you with such a warm feeling that you don't want it to ever end. And for those who've watched The Venture Bros. for all this time, it'll likely hit a hundred times harder." Danielle Dowling, writing for The New York Times, also said that the film ended on a high note and said that "If we were never to see the Ventures again, Radiant lets us part with them on a high note, but hopefully this end is just the beginning."
