= Sluštice =

- Municipality
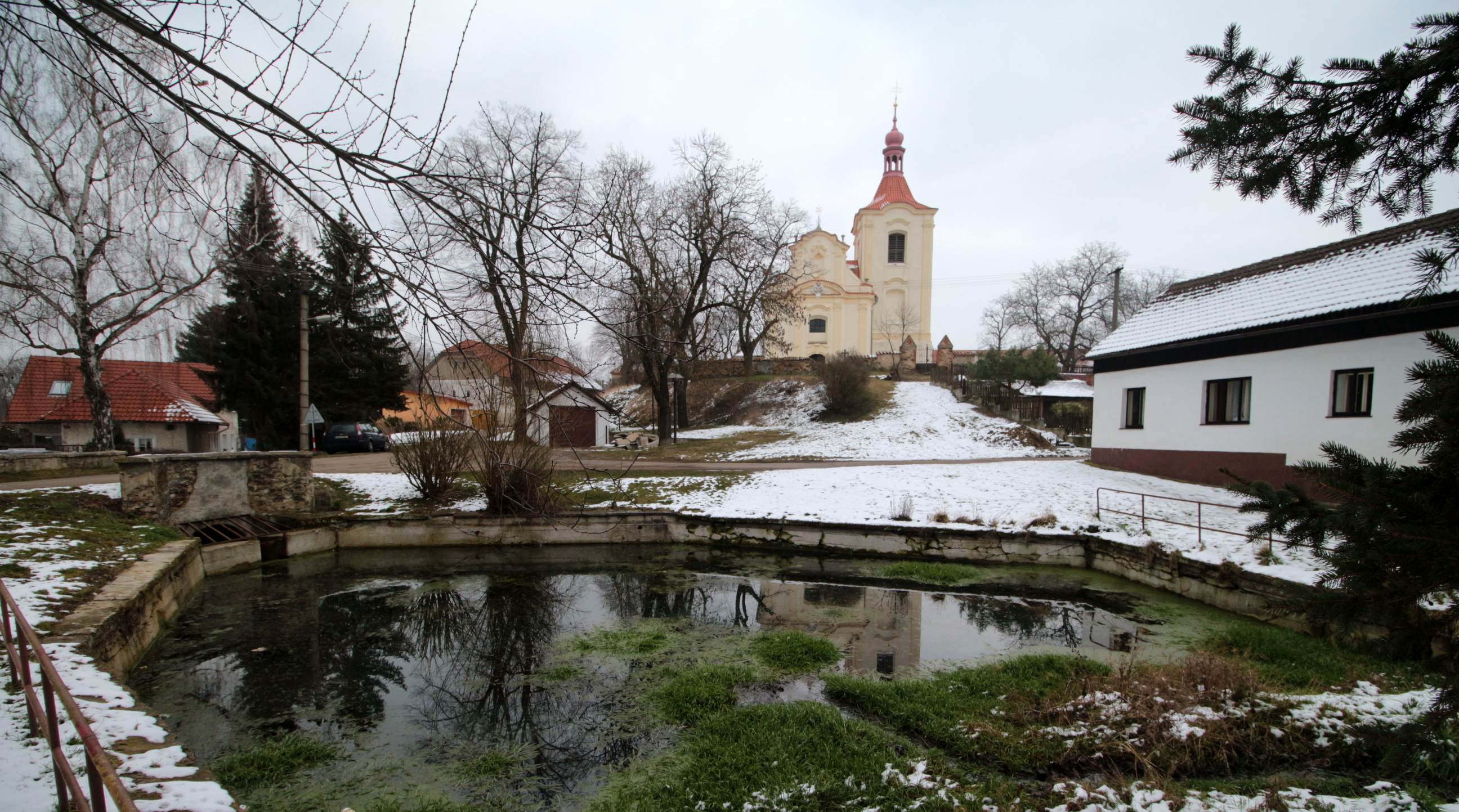
- Centre with the Church of Saint James the Great

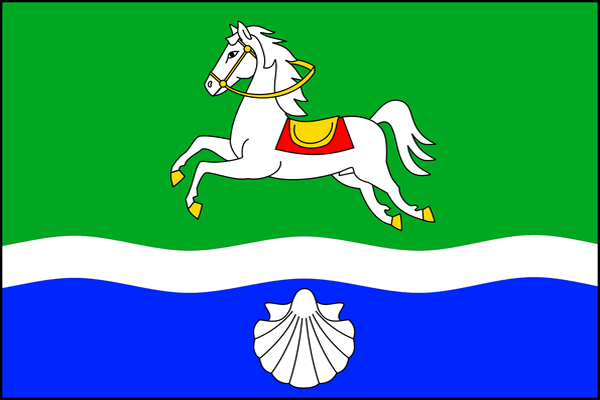
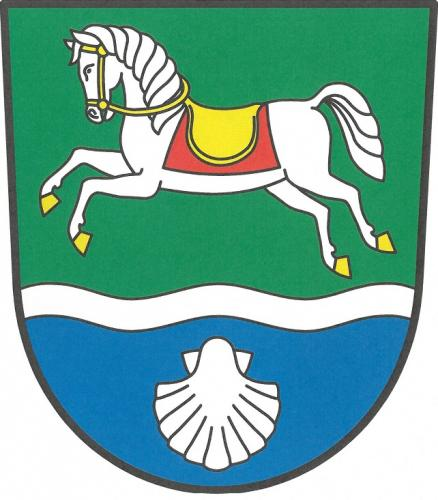
- Flag Coat of arms

- Location in the Czech Republic
- Coordinates: 50°2′21″N 14°41′8″E
- Country: Czech Republic
- Region: Central Bohemian
- District: Prague-East
- First mentioned: 1223

Area
  - Total: 4.10 km^{2} (1.58 sq mi)
- Elevation: 306 m (1,004 ft)

Population (2026-01-01)
  - Total: 758
  - Density: 185/km^{2} (479/sq mi)
- Time zone: UTC+1 (CET)
  - Summer (DST): UTC+2 (CEST)
- Postal code: 250 84
- Website: www.obecslustice.cz

Sluštice (German: Sluschtitz) is a municipality and village in Prague-East District in the Central Bohemian Region of the Czech Republic. It has about 800 inhabitants.

== Etymology ==
The name is derived from the personal name Služka, meaning "the village of Služka's people".

== Geography ==
Sluštice is located about 4 kilometres (2 mi) southeast of Prague. It lies in the Prague Plateau. The Výmola Stream flows through the municipality. The highest point is at 332 m (1,089 ft) above sea level.

== History ==
The first written mention of Sluštice is from 1223, when the village was a property of Mstidruh of Sluštice. The parish church was founded in 1223 and the fortress in SLuštice was first mentioned in 1416.

In 1519, Sluštice was bought by Marta Pechancová of Bezděkov. At that time the fortress was not inhabited, the village was controlled from Královice and Křenice and the local fortress ceased to exist. The village of Sluštice belonged to the Královice and Křenice estates.

In 1623 (at the time of the Thirty Years' War), Sluštice was confiscated, sold to Prince Karl I of Liechtenstein and incorporated into the estate of Škvorec with which it shared its fate.

== Demographics ==
Historical population

| Year | Pop. | ±% |
|---|---|---|
| 1869 | 395 | — |
| 1880 | 460 | +16.5% |
| 1890 | 440 | −4.3% |
| 1900 | 408 | −7.3% |
| 1910 | 447 | +9.6% |

| Year | Pop. | ±% |
|---|---|---|
| 1921 | 443 | −0.9% |
| 1930 | 454 | +2.5% |
| 1950 | 320 | −29.5% |
| 1961 | 336 | +5.0% |
| 1970 | 275 | −18.2% |

| Year | Pop. | ±% |
|---|---|---|
| 1980 | 325 | +18.2% |
| 1991 | 278 | −14.5% |
| 2001 | 304 | +9.4% |
| 2011 | 341 | +12.2% |
| 2021 | 804 | +135.8% |

Source: Censuses

== Transport ==
There are no railways or major roads passing through the municipality.

== Sights ==
The main landmark of Sluštice is the Church of Saint James the Great. It was built in the Baroque style in 1746–1749, after the original Gothic church from the 13th century was badly damaged by a fire in 1716. The roof and a part of the façade of the church were restored in 2006.

== In popular culture ==
A part of the comedy The Snowdrop Festival (1984) was filmed in the school building.
