= Mors Syphilitica =

American gothic rock/ethereal band

Mors Syphilitica was an American gothic rock/ethereal band formed in 1995 in New York City by Lisa Hammer (née Houle) and Eric Hammer after the breakup of their prior band Requiem in White. Their music combined often-surreal lyrics with unusual instruments such as mandolin and banjo, as well more conventional instruments like guitar. Lisa Hammer's operatic vocals gave Mors Syphilitica's music a distinctive powerful, sweeping quality. On record, all of the instruments were played by Eric Hammer; in concert, they were accompanied by live drummers and bass players.

Their first, self-titled 12" single (consisting of the song "Whispers in the House of Truth" backed with a cover of "The Damned Don't Cry" by Visage) on Sacrum Torch had a limited but successful release of 300 copies. Their three subsequent full-length albums were released by Sacrum Torch; the last album, Feather and Fate, was distributed by Projekt Records, which gave Mors Syphilitica access to a much wider audience. It received a four-star rating from AllMusic, which described it as "at once contemporary and timeless."

The band did not conduct many interviews, preferring that their music spoke for itself rather than warranting explanation.

== Discography ==
=== Albums ===
- Mors Syphilitica (1996, Sacrum Torch)
- Primrose (1998, Sacrum Torch)
- Feather and Fate (2001, Sacrum Torch/Projekt)

=== Singles ===
- Mors Syphilitica 12-inch single (1996, Sacrum Torch)
