= Christopher McCulloch =

American storyboard artist and voice actor

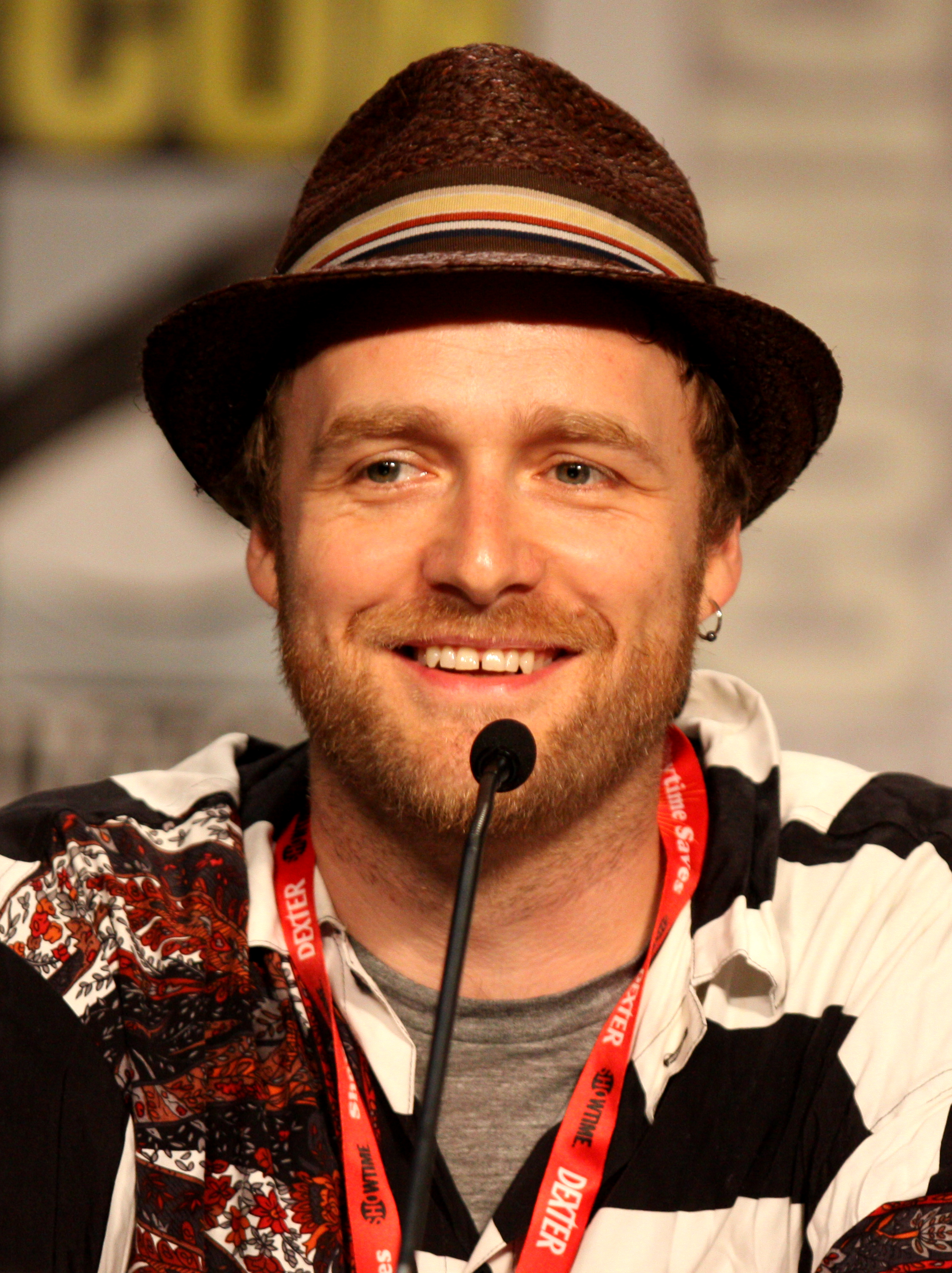
- McCulloch at San Diego Comic-Con in July 2011.
- Other name: Jackson Publick; Chris McCulloch
- Occupations: Storyboard artist, writer, director, producer, voice actor
- Years active: 1994–present
- Website: http://www.astrobasego.com

Christopher McCulloch, also known by the pseudonym Jackson Publick, is an American storyboard artist, writer, director, producer, and voice actor. He is known for his work on several Tick properties and for the animated television series The Venture Bros. He and Doc Hammer are the Venture Bros. co-creators, writers, editors, and directors, producing the show through their animation company Astro-Base Go. McCulloch voices over 20 characters in the series, including Hank Venture, The Monarch, and Sergeant Hatred.

== Career ==
Before he became a student at Rutgers University, Christopher McCulloch worked in his hometown comic-book shop and wrote comics stories in his spare time. His employer published his superhero spoof Cement Shooz, and when McCulloch promoted it at a comic book convention in New York, he was approached by Ben Edlund, creator of the comic-book character the Tick, who had read Cement Shooz and offered McCulloch the chance to write for a spinoff of The Tick. McCulloch wrote The Tick" Karma Tornado #1-4, additionally penciling issue #3. When the Fox Kids Network increased its order of Edlund's animated series The Tick, McCulloch was drafted as a staff writer and a storyboard artist.

The Venture Bros. was conceived as a short comics story for a comics anthology by Monkeysuit Press, of which McCulloch is the editor. Working on The Tick (and listening to J.G. Thirlwell's first Steroid Maximus album) helped McCulloch translate the story into cartoon form. He wrote the first draft in 2000 while he was attempting to pitch something else to Comedy Central, which turned it down. At the time, he was also working as a storyboard artist for Mo Willems's Sheep in the Big City and for PB&J Otter. McCulloch was also known for his work on Codename: Kids Next Door, The Grim Adventures of Billy & Mandy and King of the Hill.

After this, The Tick was picked up in its live action form, and McCulloch moved to California. During this he met Patrick Warburton, who later went on to voice Brock Samson. When The Tick was canceled, he moved back to New York City and pitched a revised version of The Venture Bros. to Comedy Central again. Though it was turned down again, he contacted Jeff Nodelman of Noodlesoup Productions (which became World Leaders Entertainment). Adult Swim later picked up the series and the pilot was produced in 2003.

In addition to The Venture Bros. on Adult Swim, Christopher also voices several background characters in the Adult Swim animated series Superjail!. Two characters in the series (Jean and Paul, the gay inmates) had originally started out as minor characters in the show's first season, but by the second season they had become more active members of the cast, participating in major events of episodes, and even gaining entire episodes centering on them for the second and third seasons.

McCulloch has provided additional guest voices in a season 4 episode ("Prankklok") of Brendon Small's Metalocalypse and a season 5 episode ("Casablankman II") of Seth Green's Robot Chicken on Cartoon Network's late-night block Adult Swim.

He also voices Hiram McDaniels, the literal five-headed dragon/mayoral candidate, on the podcast Welcome to Night Vale.

McCulloch is the voice of Orangusnake, Boss Hosstrich and Cluckins in Cartoon Network's Mao Mao: Heroes of Pure Heart.
