= Doc Hammer =

American voice actor, musician, writer & artist (born 1967)

- Hammer at Dragon Con in 2026
- Born: Eric Hammer; February 2, 1967 (age 59); Ledyard, Connecticut, United States
- Occupations: Voice actor; musician; writer; artist
- Years active: 1985–present
- Spouse: Lisa Hammer (1989–2008)

Eric "Doc" Hammer (born February 2, 1967) is an American voice actor, musician, writer and artist. He performed in the gothic rock bands Requiem in White from 1985 to 1995 and Mors Syphilitica from 1995 to 2002. He also composed the music for the 1997 film A, B, C... Manhattan. He and Christopher McCulloch are the co-creators, writers, and editors of the animated television series The Venture Bros. (2004–2020), in which Hammer voices several recurring characters including Billy Quizboy, Henchman 21, Dr. Mrs. The Monarch, and Dermott Fictel. The show is produced through Hammer and McCulloch's company Astro-Base Go. Hammer is also the guitarist and lead vocalist of the band Weep, which formed in 2008. In 2021, Hammer founded the band Pageant Girls with vocalist Ivy Jaff.

== Early life ==
Hammer was born in Ledyard, Connecticut. He has stated that his hair naturally grows in both black and blonde, a condition he attributes to "a pigmentation problem or a birthmark or something. But my hair is naturally like this... Kinda. Because my eyebrows are black, I used to dye my whole head that color. Also, I used to enjoy looking like Dracula for some asinine reason." He lives with Ménière's disease, a disorder of the inner ear that can affect hearing and balance. He is a self-taught oil painter.

== Personal life ==
He adopted the pseudonym "Doc" in the mid-2000s.

In July 2018, Dark Horse Books, a division of Dark Horse Comics, published Go Team Venture!: The Art and Making of The Venture Bros. The book, co-authored by Hammer, Christopher McCulloch, and Kenneth Plume details the entire history of the creation of The Venture Bros. episode by episode from seasons one through six.

At an unspecified point in his adult life, Hammer suffered a back injury that left him paraplegic. He regained the use of his legs, but was left with a numb section in his back.

== Filmography ==
=== Film ===
| Year | Title | Role | Notes |
|---|---|---|---|
| 1989 | Not Farewell, Sweet Flesh | actor (Rofocale) | |
| 1990 | The Wuby Opening | | |
| 1990 | Lorenzo et Lorenzo | | |
| 1990 | The Emasculator | | |
| 1991 | Pussbucket | actor (Corned Beef), composer, props, set designer, special effects | |
| 1994 | The Fox and Hound | | |
| 1994 | The Changeling | | |
| 1997 | A, B, C... Manhattan | composer | |
| 1999 | Crawley | writer, actor (Crawley), visual effects | |
| 2004 | Period Piece | editing, visual effects | |
| 2011 | Pox | actor (Rodney Carmichael) | |
| 2023 | The Venture Bros.: Radiant Is the Blood of the Baboon Heart | writer, actor (Dr. Mrs. The Monarch, Henchman 21, Billy Quizboy, Dermott, Shoreleave, Red Mantle, Ward) | |

=== Television ===
| Year | Title | Role | Note |
|---|---|---|---|
| 2004–2020 | The Venture Bros. | writer (34 episodes), voice actor (Billy Quizboy, Henchman 21, Doctor Girlfriend, Shoreleave, Kevin, Ward, Dermott Fictel), editor, music | |
| 2026 | Robot Chicken Adult Swim Special | Henchman 21 | Television Special |
