= Anna Rezan =

Greek actress and singer (born 1992)

- Άννα Χάνα Ρεζαν Κριτσέλη
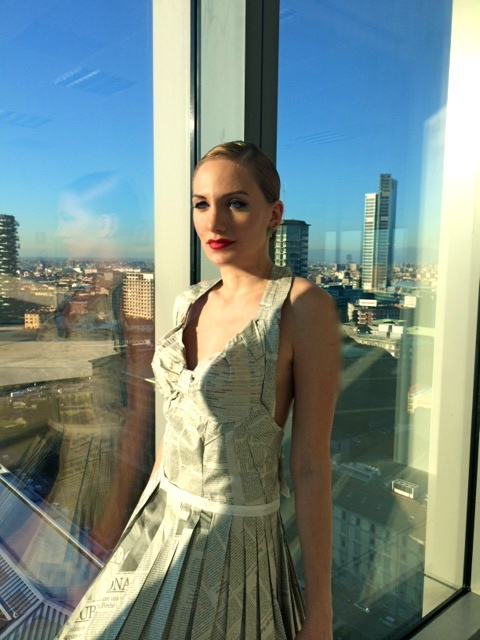
- Rezan in 2015
- Born: Hannah Rezan Kritseli; 12 December 1992 (age 33); Athens, Greece
- Other names: Anna the Kid, LadyLight, ARK
- Occupations: Actress, singer, model, filmmaker
- Years active: 2003–present

Anna Rezan (Greek: Άννα Ρεζάν; born Anna Hannah Rezan Kritseli, Greek: Άννα Χάνα Ρεζαν Κριτσέλη; 12 December 1992) is a Greek American actress, singer and filmmaker. She began her career in her early teens by appearing in Greek films and television series, most notably in the 2010 comedy film Show Bitch which premiered at the Thessaloniki International Film Festival.

Her first international feature film role was in La Commedia di Amos Poe, a new translation of Dante's Divine Comedy by Amos Poe that premiered in the 2010 Venice Film Festival and starred Roberto Benigni. Her debut song, "Let There Be Rain", was released internationally in 2011 and in 2016, "Let There be Love" was released internationally by Universal Music Group. In 2018, she co-starred in Dance Fight Love Die: With Mikis On the Road by Asteris Koutoulas. The film premiered at the Hof International Film Festival. Rezan's directorial debut, My People, is a historical documentary film, co-produced with Mitchell Block and Kim Magnusson. It premiered in Los Angeles to positive reviews and was set for release in 2025. Since 2024 she co¬stars in viral comedy crime TV series Great Kills (TV series).

== Early life ==
She was born in Athens to Fotis Kritselis and Eva Matilda Kalamara, both of whom are interested in dramatic arts. Her father, who is of Smyrniote, Cretan and Peloponnesian descent, is a federal judge who had aspirations to be a director; her mother, a Greek-Jewish attorney of Spanish and Polish descent, studied at Karolos Koun's School of Dramatic Arts before going to law school. Her maternal great-grandmother did not survive Auschwitz during World War II. Rezan has an older brother, Leon, is maternally related to Maria Rezan and paternally related to Constantine P Cavafy. Her father died in August 2007.

Rezan was interested in the arts from an early age and decided to be an actress after watching Greek movies, musicals, Disney films, and comedies. She started performing at age 11 in a school play and later performed with Stagecoach Productions. She began writing lyrics at age 9 and started electric guitar lessons at 17. At age 11, she starred in a theatrical show performing Oops!... I Did It Again while on summer holiday with her family. The following year, she starred in The Hall of Fame of the Moon, which premiered at the Greek National Opera and was produced by Cyprus' Ministry of Culture. Greece's Minister of Education attended the performance. She took classes at New York Film Academy and enrolled at Panteion University to study journalism in late 2009. She also took acting courses at Lee Strasberg Theatre and Film Institute in Los Angeles, where she lived part-time. As a teenager, her articles, which centered on love, therapy, films, and musicians such as David Bowie, Nick Cave, and The Cure, were published in indie magazines.

== Career ==
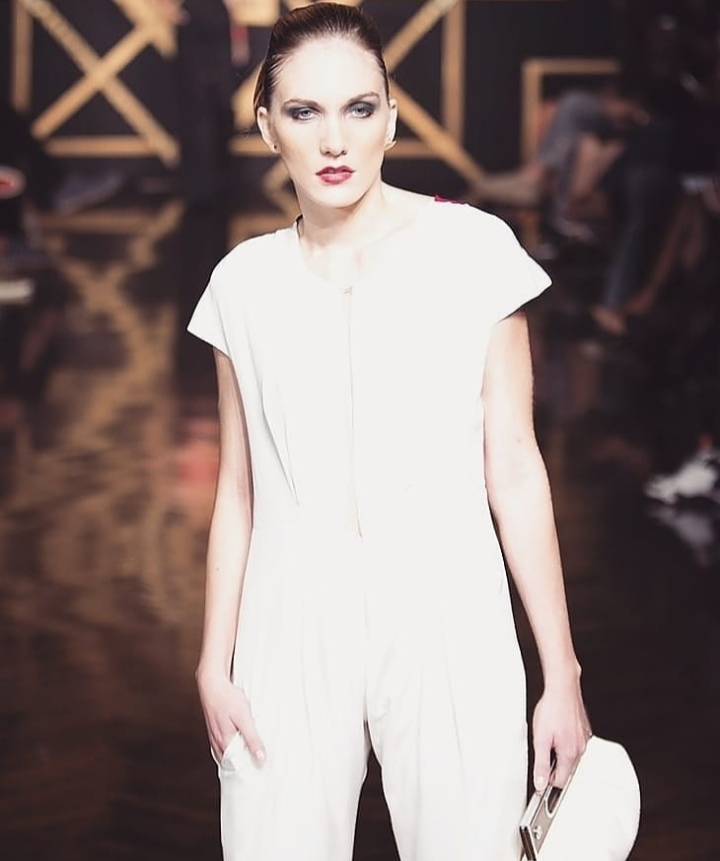
Rezan walking the runway at NYFW

=== 2005–2018 : Acting and Producing ===
In 2005, Rezan made her first appearance on Greek television in Η Νταντά, the Greek adaptation of The Nanny, and had minor parts in several TV series and films. She worked as a production runner on the set of The Sisterhood of the Traveling Pants; performed at the DJ set of Armin van Buuren in Cavo Paradiso in Mykonos; and represented Greece in the Miss European Union pageant in 2008. That year, she also appeared as Svetlana in the Greek comedy The Red Room, where she spoke Russian; starred in a TV adaption of Farewell Anatolia as Artemitsa; and performed in the rock opera The 300 Spartans on their world tour. She spent time in London in 2009 and moved briefly to New York City before resettling in Los Angeles. She continued working in Greece on projects such as the film Katharsi and as a guest star on Lola. She co-produced and co-starred in the romantic comedy Love at First Sight, a short film by Patricia di Salvo that was selected at the 2010 Cannes Film Festival. She also spent time in London modeling Couture fashion from Rira Sugawara for Vogue Italia and has walked in London Fashion Week.Discovered by Kithe Brewster she opened his show in 2014 during New York Fashion Week .

She starred as Hrysa, a teenage rock singer who turns into a rock star, in Nikos Zervo's Show Bitch in 2010. It premiered at the Thessaloniki International Film Festival. From there, she starred in a number of TV shows and films including Ever Been to the Moon?, and appeared in magazines such as Cosmopolitan, Marie Claire and Esquire. In 2015, she filmed Dance Fight Love Die: With Mikis On the Road, a docu-fiction film by Asteris Koutoulas about composer Mikis Theodorakis. The film premiered at the Hof International Film Festival in 2017 and was released in theaters in 2018. Mikis Theodorakis and George Dalaras praised her performance. In 2016, she hosted the first annual Hellas Filmbox festival awards ceremony in Berlin, the city's first-ever Greek film festival. The following year, she portrayed supermodel Kate Mosscowitz in Victoria Larimore's Open House.

=== 2019–Present : Directing and Acting Breakthrough ===
In 2019, Rezan began the production of Beauty Before Age, a British television sitcom comedy, that was set for release in 2024.In 2022, she co-produced The Re Education Camp, a short documentary focusing on the Makronisos concentration camp used during the Greek Civil War and the Greek junta.

Her feature directorial debut My People, which she wrote, directed, produced, and narrated, is a feature-length documentary about Jews in Greece & the Greek Resistance movement during World War II. The film premiered in Los Angeles in 2022 at the Los Angeles Greek Film Festival. In October 2022, it had its New York city premiere where it won the Audience Award for Best Film. The film had its Colorado premiere at the Vail Film Festival.

In January 2023 the Order of AHEPA Bergen Knights Chapter #285 hosted the New Jersey Premiere of "My People," to honor the Holocaust Remembrance Day as well as Rezan for promoting Hellenism across the world.

In September 2023 Rezan was honored by Brock Pierce and members of Congress for her contribution to history and culture, in Washington, DC. A week after, she returned on stage and starred at Giannis Ritsos play in her native Greece, which was directed by Asteris Kutulas In November she staged a musical theater piece, titled 'I am Calling my Old Friends...' to commemorate the 50 year anniversary of the Athens Polytechnic uprising.

Since 2024 she co¬stars in viral Tubi comedy crime TV series Great Kills (TV series). In October 2024 she is filming in Germany alongside Eric Roberts, portraying the lead role of "Nea" in sci-fi action franchise "City Rush 4" that is set to be released in 2025.

In November 2025 Rezan was on set in Pennsylvania for "Mr Blueshirt: The Inspiration" and the film is set to be released in 2026. In December she was on the cover of InStyle. Same month she appeared on Ranker.com's 'The Most Beautiful Greek Women' list and was voted number 1 among Zoe Kazan, Jennifer Aniston and Elena Kampouris.

In February 2026 Rezan in Belfast, Ireland costarring as Natasha O'Conell in "An Irish American Horror" by Irish filmmaker Olcan McSparron.In March 2026 she is in New York portraying the character of Max in the indie movie “The Water Thief” directed by Ben Tripp.Same year she is on set in Fresno for horror film “1209 Covenstead” by Freddy Falcon.

=== Music ===
Rezan released her first song, "Let There Be Rain" from the film Show Bitch, in 2011 and co-produced the music video in Brooklyn, New York City. The track was produced at Equinox Studios in Luxembourg and aired for the first time in the United States on the CBS radio show Zodiac Divas in 2013. She covered the song "Happiness Is a Warm Gun" by the Beatles in a 2015 public service announcement directed by Amos Poe. In 2016, she signed with Minos EMI and Universal Music Group and released "Let There Be Love." "My Summer Night," a Latin pop ballad duet with Barbara Sassari, came out in 2017, as did her cover of Mikis Theodorakis' "The Honeymoon Song" in the style of the Beatles. The music video was released ahead of the film Dance Fight Love Die: With Mikis On the Road. She also performed "Day in May" in German and "The Bells Will Ring" in Greek and English during the film. In 2020, she recorded and released worldwide a Greek version of "My Summer Night" called "San Nychta Kalokairini" and a week after she released a cover of the 1970s Greek folk song "Kapoios Giortazi" with Barbara Sassari. In November 2023 she collaborated with Julio Iglesias and her cover of "Baila Morena" featuring Taavi Vartia was released by Universal Music Group

== Other ventures & Politics ==
In 2013, Rezan was a special guest at the fourth J'adore la mode Gala charity fashion show in Philadelphia benefitting the organization Evoluer House, which empowers young women through applicable skill-building programs. She has been a patron of Models Against Addiction, an organization dedicated to ending the stigma of addiction, since 2013. Also in 2013, she appeared in Constantinos Isaias' public service announcement "We Love Cyprus" and her 2015 cover of "Happiness Is a Warm Gun" was part of a PSA to raise awareness about breast cancer. In 2020, she was a guest lecturer at the Athens School of Fine Arts to discuss "Beauty ... shall reunite with Art" and to the Henry Reeve Brigade at the Cuban Embassy in Athens to support their initiative to nominate Cuban doctors of Cuban medical internationalism for a Nobel Peace Prize. In November 2022 Rezan was the head of Jury committee for the "Bridges" Peloponnese International Film Festival that was held in Loutraki, Greece. Rezan made optimistic remarks regarding the 2023 SAG-AFTRA strike which she supported actively.She said that "When people realise the great power that comes from unity, is always a big win for us all". In 2024, President of political party Course of Freedom,Zoe Konstantopoulou invited her to join and as stated, she happily accepted.

== Personal life ==
Rezan is largely private about her personal life but has made a concerted effort to be open about her struggles with depression, panic attacks, and anxiety and her recovery journey. She has spoken about different types of therapy and self-healing in the hope that it would inspire others to seek help. In 2011, she shared her life mottos: "love brings love" and "love is the greatest power of all" as the youngest member of the board of MMA Foundation in NYC" She also supports World Wildlife Foundation, and Action Aid and is the founder of the Love Brings Love organization.

Tabloids have been interested in Rezan's romantic life since her teenage years when she dated Panos Mouzourakis. In 2009, she was thought to have dated The Durrells actor Alexis Georgoulis; in 2010, her Show Bitch co-star Nassos Papargyropoulos; and in 2011, Panagiotis Bougiouris. In 2014, she denied rumors that she and Alexander Payne had a romantic relationship. but she stated that he is a friend that she admires. In August 2023 Rezan was spotted on vacation with Yorgo Constantine on a Greek island.

== Filmography ==
=== Film ===
Year	Film	Actor (+ Role)	Director	Producer	Other crew	Ref
2005	Woman Is... a Tough Person	Young clubber				
2006	Eduart	Girl				
2007	Socrates: Lost in Olympia					
2008	The Sisterhood of the Traveling Pants 2	Beautiful student (uncredited)			Production runner	
2009	Katharsi (Κάθαρση)	Babe				
2010	La Commedia di Amos Poe	Sofia				
2010	Love at First Sight?	Sacha		Yes		
2010	Show Bitch	Chrysa			Performer	
2012	The Immature: The Trip	The dancer				
2012	The Story of My Life	Workaholic				
2012	Greenfish420					
2012	Ice Age: Continental Drift (Greek dub)	Mammoth Katie				
2013	Knights of Light	Knight of Light		Yes		
2013	We Love Cyprus	Self				
2014	The Secret of the Gods	Paola				
2015	Ever Been to the Moon?	Cinzia				
2015	MadWalk by Aperol Spritz: The Fashion Music Project	Self				
2017	Pame allios (Πάμε αλλιώς)	Self				
2018	Dance Fight Love Die: With Mikis on the Road	Maria			Performer	
2020	Celebrating Life	Rapunzel	Yes	Yes	Performer, writer, editor, cinematographer	
2021	Naptorun Pansiyon	Katrin				
2023	My People		Yes	Yes	Narrator, director, music supervisor, writer, editor, additional cinematography, visual effects artist, sound designer	
2023	Post-production	The Re Education Camp			Yes	Producer, Still photographer
Pre-Production	African Mystique	Actress				
2024	Mr Blue Shirt: The Inspiration	Aphrodite		Yes		
2025	City Rush 4	Nea				
Post-Production	An Irish American Horror	Natasha O'Conell		Yes		
Post-Production	The Water Thief	Max				
"Filming"	1209 Covenstead	Sadie		Yes		

=== TV series ===
Year	Series	Role	Notes	Ref	
2003	Omorfos kosmos to proi (Όμορφος κόσμος το πρωί)	Self			
2005	I dada (Η Νταντά)	Ballet dancer	Greek version of The Nanny; 2 episodes		
2007	Zoi xana (Ζωή ξανά)	Joy	1 episode		
2007	An ypirhes tha se horiza (Αν υπήρχες θα σε χώριζα)	Stella	1 episode		
2007	Ta koritsia tou baba (Τα κορίτσια του βαβα)	Supermodel	2 episodes		
2007	Eythismenoi Mazi (Ευτυχισμένοι μαζί)	Suzanna	2 episodes		
2008	Yungermann (Γιούγκερμαν)	Zizi	4 episodes		
2008	Ihni (Ίχνη)	Agni	2 episodes		
2008	Latremenoi mou geitones (Λατρεμένοι μου γείτονες)	Dancer	1 episode		
2008	Matomena homata (Ματωμένα χώματα)	Artemitsa	4 episodes		
2008	To kokkino domatio (Το κόκκινο δωμάτιο)	Svetlana	2 episodes		
2008	Loufa kai Paralagi: I seira (Λούφα και Παραλλαγή)	Marianne	1 episode		
2008	Dady's Girls	Supermodel			
2009	Lola (Λoλα)	Nadea	12 episodes		
2009	Litsa.com (ΛΙΤΣΑ.COM)	Athina	1 episode		
2009	Sex Shop TV	Bella			
2010	I zoi tis allis (Η Ζωή της Άλλης)	Sonia	11 episodes		
2012	Rantevou gia sinema	Self			
2015	The Good Wife	Young lawyer (uncredited)	1 episode		
2017	Open House	Kate Mosscowitz			
2020	Emily in Paris	Influencer (uncredited)			
2022	Beauty Before Age	Tina	Yes	Yes	Writer, creative director
2023-2026	Great Kills (TV series)	Lizzy	Co-star		

== Stage ==
Year	Title	Role	Director	Ref
2003	The Hall of Fame of the Moon	Queen Night		
2007	Assemblywomen	Young girl		
2009	The 300 Spartans on Stage (The Rock Opera)	Aphrodite		
2016	Hellas Film Box Awards ceremony	Comedian		
2020	Performance Art	Ernesto Guevara		
2021	Peace (play)	Hermes		
2023	Performance Art by Asteris Kutulas	Giannis Ritsos		
2023	I am Calling my Old Friends	Joker	Yes	

== Discography ==
Year	Title	Type	Label	Music video	Music video notes	Notes	Ref
2011	"Let There Be Rain"	Single	Equinox Records, Moda Records	Yes	Directed by Aksel Stasny	Show Bitch Film Original Soundtrack	
2015	"Happiness Is a Warm Gun"	Cover		Yes	Role: The boy, the girl	PSA by Amos Poe	
2016	"Let There Be Love"	Single	Universal Music Group and Minos EMI	Yes	Directed by Antreas Stavrinides		
2017	"My Summer Night" (feat. Barbara Sassari)	Single	Universal Music Group and Minos EMI	Yes	Directed by Christos Daskalothanasis		
2017	"The Honeymoon Song"	Cover (The Beatles version)		Yes	Directed by Asteris Koutoulas	From Asteris Koutoulas' Dance Fight Love Die: With Mikis On the Road	
2018	"The Bells Will Ring"					From Asteris Koutoulas' Dance Fight Love Die: With Mikis On the Road	
2018	"Day in May"					From Asteris Koutoulas' Dance Fight Love Die: With Mikis On the Road	
2020	"Like a Summer Night" (feat. Barbara Sassari)	Single	Universal Music Group and Minos EMI	Yes	Director, producer, singer; role: Mermaid		
2020	"Celebrating Life" (feat. Barbara Sassari)	Single	Universal Music Group and Minos EMI	Yes	Director, producer, singer		
2022	"Everything I Say To You" (Oti Sou Leo)	Music video appearance	Yes			Song by Vassilis Dimas	
2023	"Baila Morena" (feat. Taavi Vartia)	Cover	Universal Music Group and Minos EMI	Yes	Director, producer, singer	in collaboration with Julio Iglesias	
