= The Testimony (2015 film) =

- Film poster
- Directed by: Vanessa Block
- Produced by: Vanessa Block; Steve Tisch; Mitchell Block
- Cinematography: Vanessa Block
- Edited by: Michael Sarnoski
- Music by: Nathan Pangrazio
- Production companies: Atria Film; Escape Artists; BlockBox Entertainment
- Release date: August 21, 2015
- Country: United States

The Testimony is a 2015 American short documentary film about the "Minova Trial", conducted in 2014 by the army of the Democratic Republic of the Congo to prosecute government troops' rapes and atrocities committed against women in Minova in 2012. It was the largest rape trial in DRC history.

The film is directed and shot by Vanessa Block and produced by Block, Steve Tisch and Mitchell Block, and executive produced by Michael Sarnoski. The Testimony was shortlisted with ten other documentaries from 74 entries submitted to the 88th Academy Awards in Documentary Short Subject category.

== Plot ==
Following the Second Congo War, hostilities soon broke out again in 2004 in the eastern part of the country. Tutsi-allied rebels fought against government troops and UN forces. The warfare in the Democratic Republic of the Congo has involved troops and insurgents from numerous countries and resulted in more deaths than any other war since World War II.

In November 2012, the M23 rebellion drove the Congolese Army out of the eastern city of Goma. After retreating to Minova, the humiliated government soldiers systematically raped hundreds of civilian women for the next three days. There were reports that officers encouraged the men to attack the women. The atrocity drew international outrage, and the "UN condemned the atrocity as “horrifying” in its scale and systematic nature."

The global community promised intervention. William Hague, then foreign secretary in the United Kingdom, and the film star Angelina Jolie, a UN special envoy for refugees, visited a refugee camp and later pledged "to eradicate sexual violence in war zones, with its lead focus on eastern Congo."

This attention galvanized the DRC Army, which began to organize prosecution of the rapes. The documentary chronicles what became known as the Minova Trial of 2014, the largest rape trial conducted in Congo's history. It is focused on the women of Minova. Fifty-six women testified, with their heads covered by hoods to preserve their anonymity.

== Reception ==
The film was widely praised for revealing the strength of the human spirit among the women. It was shortlisted for an Academy Award for Short Documentary.

== Aftermath ==
The Guardian has since revealed military and governmental efforts to limit prosecution in the trial, and no senior officers were prosecuted. "Of the 39 Congolese soldiers who eventually appeared in court, only two junior soldiers were convicted of rape." The UN recorded 126 women and girls had been raped, but the American Bar Association's office in Goma listed 1,014 victims.

A London global summit took place later in 2014, with some 1700 attendees, but none of the women from Minova nor their representatives were invited.

=== Accolades ===
| Year | Award / Film Festival | Category | Result | Ref(s) |
|---|---|---|---|---|
| 2015 | Academy Awards | Best Documentary Short Subject | Nominated | |
| 2016 | Los Angeles International Culture Film Festival | Best Documentary | Nominated | |

== See also ==
- Sexual violence in the Democratic Republic of the Congo
