= Great Kills (TV series) =

2023 American Dark Comedy thriller television series

- Official poster
- Genre: Dark Comedy Thriller (genre)
- Created by: James Merendino Lisa Hammer
- Based on: '’The Invisible Life of Thomas Lynch’'
- Directed by: James Merendino
- Starring: Steve S. Stanulis; James Merendino; Lisa Hammer; Levi Wilson; John Bianco; Christina Mavronas; Bari Hyman; Eric Roberts; Anna Rezan; Anthony Mangano
- Music by: Bridge City Sinners
- Original language: English
- No. of episodes: 8

Production
- Executive producers: Steve S. Stanulis; James Merendino; Jennifer Dilandro
- Cinematography: Levi Wilson; Lisa Hammer
- Running time: 25 minutes
- Production companies: Stanulis Films; Ross Productions

Original release
- Network: Tubi
- Release: March 25, 2023

Great Kills is an American dark comedy crime drama television series created by James Merendino and Lisa Hammer with Producer and Star Steve S. Stanulis that premiered on Tubi on March 25, 2023.

== Premise ==
Great Kills is a dark comedy, mockumentary satire about a documentary crew that follows a lonely contract killer, Tom Lynch (Steve Stanulis), from Great Kills, Staten Island. The show portrays Tom as a lonely but likable individual as he navigates his secret life as a contract killer. Meanwhile, the filmmakers behind the documentary are cynical, dispassionate people, unaffected by the violence they document. Tom's world is thrown into chaos as it becomes clear that someone is on to him. The documentary crew become entangled in Tom's plight and their need to ’stay objective’ goes out the window as they are all the target of a mysterious plot.
