= La commedia di Amos Poe =

- Film poster
- Directed by: Amos Poe
- Written by: Amos Poe
- Based on: Divine Comedy by Dante Alighieri
- Produced by: Ben Bindra; Amos Poe; Elena Santamaria; J.R. Skola
- Starring: Loretta Mugnai; Roberto Benigni; Anna Rezan; Sandro Lombardi; Chrysa Avrami
- Cinematography: Amos Poe
- Edited by: Amos Poe; Ben Bindral
- Music by: Michael DuClos; Brenda Elthon; Hayley Moss
- Production companies: The Bousis Film Company; Rain Film
- Release date: September 1, 2010 (Venice Film Festival)
- Countries: United States; Italy
- Language: Italian

La commedia di Amos Poe (lit. 'The Comedy of Amos Poe') is a 2010 experimental documentary film by Amos Poe. The film had its world premiere on 1 September 2010 at the Venice Film Festival. The film is a new translation of Dante's Divine Comedy and stars Roberto Benigni and Sandro Lombardi. The film's poster was designed by William Bisgrove.

== Cast ==
- Sandro Lombardi as Face
- Loretta Mugnai as Beatrice
- Roberto Benigni
- Anna Rezan
- Alfonso Santagata
- Chrysa Avrami
