= Marianna Yarovskaya =

Russian-American documentary filmmaker

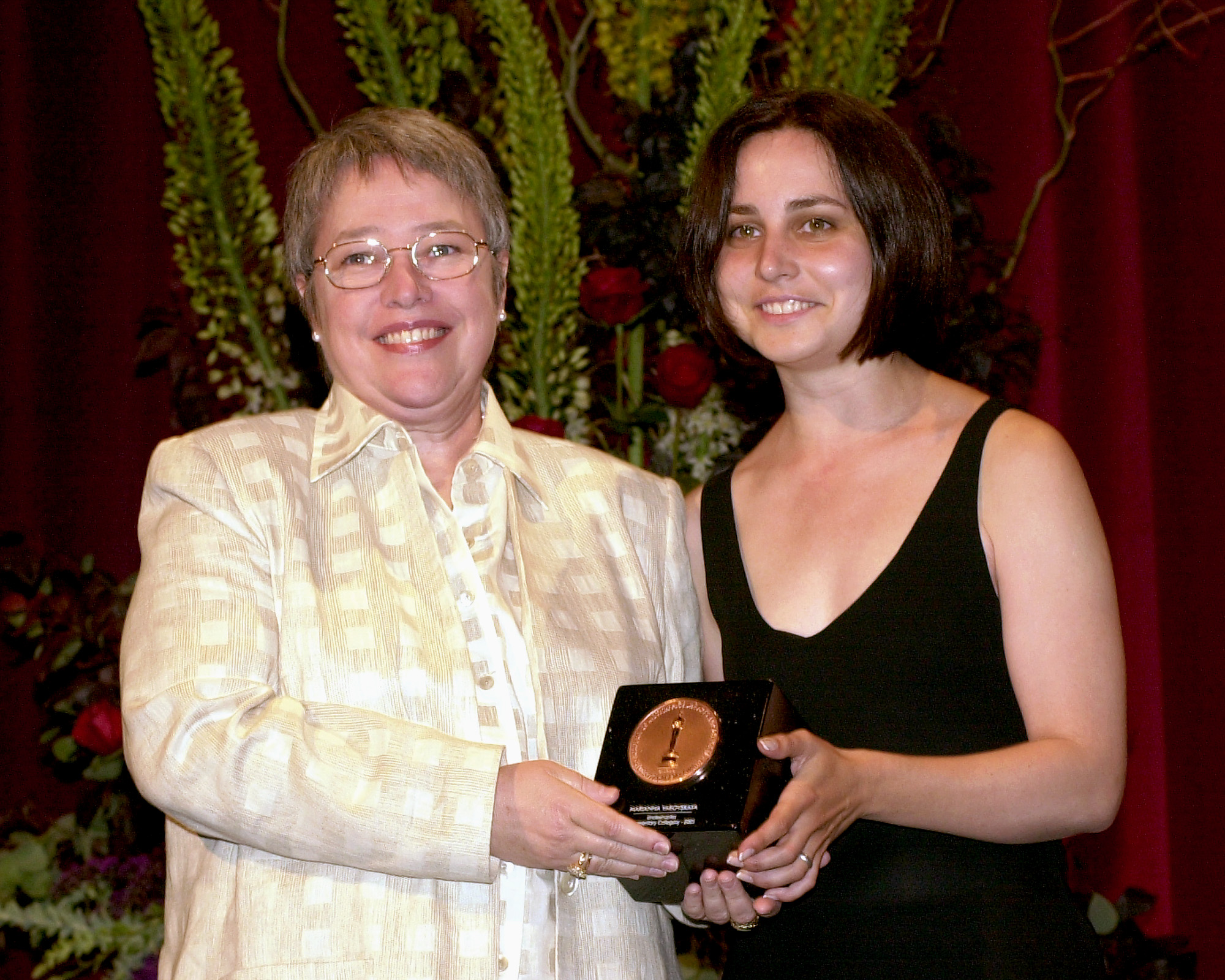
- Marianna Yarovskaya receiving 2001 Student Academy Award from Kathy Bates
- Born: December 1, 1971 (age 54); Moscow, Russia
- Occupation: Documentary filmmaker
- Years active: 1991–present
- Notable work: Women of the Gulag

Marianna Yarovskaya is a Russian-American documentary filmmaker who is the director and producer of the 2018 Academy Award short-listed documentary film Women of the Gulag based on the book Women of the Gulag: Stories of Five Remarkable Lives by Paul Roderick Gregory (2013). She also produced Greedy Lying Bastards (2012).

== Early life and education ==
Yarovskaya is the daughter of Russian actor and director Marianna Yablonskaya and a rocket scientist, Arkady Yarovsky.

She first studied journalism at Moscow State University, before moving to California and studying film at the USC School of Cinematic Arts.

== Filmography ==
In 1998, Yarovskaya directed Undesirables (Student Academy Award, 2001). Her documentary film Holy Warriors, a study of soldiers who found religion, has played in 35 countries worldwide. In 2006, she was a head of research on An Inconvenient Truth which won an Academy Award for Best Documentary Feature. She produced feature films Greedy Lying Bastards (2012) and Pussy Riot: the Movement (2013). Yarovskaya worked in the research department on Into the Arms of Strangers: Stories of the Kindertransport (2001), and on award-winning feature documentaries Countdown to Zero (2010), Samsara (2012), Spirit of the Marathon II (2013), Last Days in Vietnam (2014), Vessel (2014), Merchants of Doubt (2014), Red Army (2014), Swift Current (2016), Betting on Zero (2016), Boston (2017), Blood Road (2017), "Big Lies" (2018), "Skid Row Marathon" (2019), "Oleg" (2021), and Selena Gomez: My Mind & Me (2022).

Since 2000, she has also worked for Discovery Channel, National Geographic, the History Channel, Greenpeace and Netflix as Producer and Senior Editor.

Yarovskaya produced Women of the Gulag with historian Paul Roderick Gregory and executive producer Mitchell Block. The film premiered at the 41st Moscow International Film Festival in 2018. The film was shortlisted for an Academy Award in the "best documentary short" category. It won festivals in Iceland, US/California, South Korea, Hong Kong, France, Canada, Croatia, and Russia. The film's Russian TV premiere took place in May 2021, but the film was censored.

Select Filmography of Marianna Yarovskaya
S. No.	Film/Documentary	Year	Role
1	Undesirables	1999	Director, Producer
2	An Inconvenient Truth	2007	Head of Research
3	Holy Warriors	2007	Director, Producer
4	Samsara	2011	Researcher
5	Greedy Lying Bastards	2012	Producer
6	Pussy Riot: The Movement	2013	Executive Producer
7	Women of the Gulag	2018	Director, Producer
8	Big Lies	2019	Producer
9	Oleg: The Oleg Vidov Story	2021	Producer
10	How to Become a Tyrant	2022	Associate Producer
11	Selena Gomez: My Mind & Me	2022	Archive Researcher
12	Vishniac	2023	Archive Researcher
13	Yours in Freedom, Bill Baird	2023	Archive Producer
14	999	2024	Archive Producer
15	Magazine Dreams	2025	Archive Researcher
16	Heist	2025	Archive Producer
17	Lyuba's Hope	2026	Director, Producer

== Awards and recognition ==
1. Marianna directed and produced Undesirables, which won a Student Academy Award (Student Oscar) and a College Television Award and was screened at Cannes.
2. An Inconvenient Truth won an Academy Award for Best Documentary Feature.
3. She is a recipient of the National Endowment for the Humanities (NEH) Bridging Cultures Through Film grant.
4. Women of the Gulag was short-listed for Academy Award Documentary Nomination in 2019.
5. Yarovskaya is the first female director from Russia short-listed for the Oscars.
