= Kevin Weisman =

American actor (born 1970)

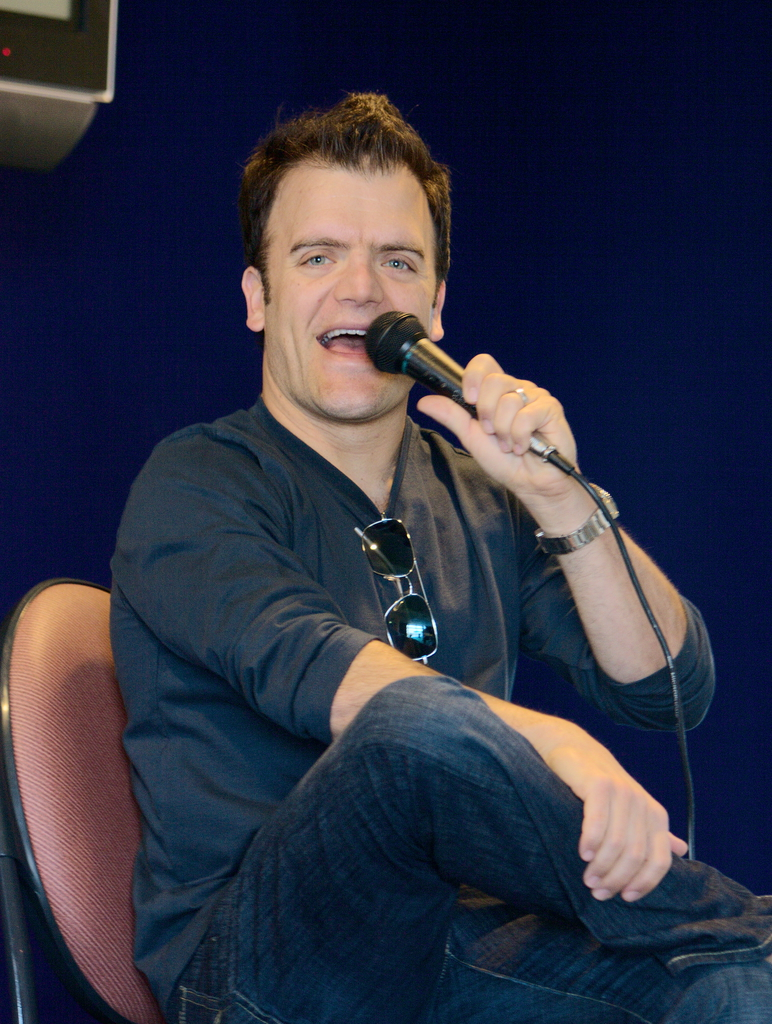
- Weisman at Sydney Supanova 2006
- Born: Kevin Glen Weisman; December 29, 1970 (age 55); Los Angeles, California, U.S.
- Education: Bachelor of Fine Arts
- Alma mater: UCLA
- Occupation: Actor
- Years active: 1988–present
- Spouse: Jodi Tanowitz (m. 2005; div. 2011)
- Children: 2
- Website: www.kevinweisman.com

Kevin Glen Weisman (born December 29, 1970) is an American actor. He is known for portraying Marshall Flinkman in the ABC action thriller series Alias (2001–2006), Ray Spiewack in the CBS action drama series Scorpion (2015–2017), and Ned Berring in the Amazon Prime Video legal drama series Goliath (2016). In 2017, Weisman began a three-year stint as Dale Yorkes on the Hulu series Marvel's Runaways, before starring as Lester Thompson in the 2025 NBC drama Suits LA.

== Early life ==
Weisman was born to a Jewish family in Los Angeles, California. He pursued acting at a young age, first appearing as The Professor in a fourth grade production of Gilligan's Island. While at Taft High School In Woodland Hills, California (a neighborhood of Los Angeles), Weisman participated in local drama festivals in and around the Los Angeles area (DTASC), performing work from the likes of William Shakespeare and Neil Simon.

He went on to receive a BA from the University of California, Los Angeles School of Theater, Film and Television, and then to further his study of the craft of acting at New York's prestigious Circle in the Square Theatre. Weisman is a founding member of the multi-award-winning Los Angeles based theater troupe, Buffalo Nights Theater Company.

== Stage credits ==
In 2015, Weisman was awarded a Lead Actor Award (Stage Raw) for his work as Francois Villon in Murray Mednick's Villon, which premiered at the Odyssey Theater in Los Angeles. The show was produced by the Padua Playwrights.

Prior Los Angeles productions include tackling the role of frustrated writer Arthur Kellogg in Jaime Pachino's 2012 West Coast premiere of The Return to Morality with the Production Company in Los Angeles.

A founding member of Buffalo Nights Theatre Company, Weisman has produced, directed, and acted in over 25 productions in and around the Los Angeles area. Highlights include the title role of Anatol in Arthur Schnitzler's Anatol, and as Los Angeles philanthropist and convicted felon Griffith J. Griffith in the award- winning Crazy Drunk at the John Anson Ford Theatre in Los Angeles. Other notable productions with the company include Jean Giraudoux's Apollo of Bellac (LA Weekly Production of the Year); Madman and the Nun, The Firebugs, Suburban Motel, Ethan Lipton's Hope on the Range, Arthur Miller's Incident at Vichy, Oscar Wilde's Salome, and the West Coast Premiere of Jonathan Marc Sherman's Sophistry.

Other theatrical turns include stand out performances at The Odyssey Theater and the Mark Taper Forum in masterworks such as 'Tis Pity She's a Whore, The Greeks (Ovation Award for Production of the Year) and The Goldoni Trilogy . Weisman has also treaded the boards at the La Mirada Theatre for the Performing Arts, where he appeared as Uncle Louie In Neil Simon's Lost in Yonkers, and as Gabe in Donald Margulies' Pulitzer Prize winning play, Dinner with Friends, directed by Brian Kite.

== Other work ==
Internationally known for his portrayal of Marshall J. Flinkman for five seasons on the critically acclaimed ABC series Alias, Weisman was later cast as series regular, Kives, in the 2013 Stephen Merchant/HBO project Hello Ladies, in which TV.com named Weisman one of the "season's best new characters". In 2015, Weisman joined the cast of the David E. Kelley Amazon series, Goliath, as agoraphobic recluse Ned Berring.

Later that year, Weisman appeared as Stevie in a first-season episode of AMC's Better Call Saul entitled Hero, and landed the recurring role of Dr. Jeffrey Maynard on NBC's hit drama, The Blacklist. That same year, Weisman was tapped to play bon vivant Ray Spiewack on the CBS drama Scorpion, which resulted in a raucous three season arc. Other fan favorites include the recurring Assistant DA, Todd Erlich, on TNT's Perception, and a memorable turn as Anson Stokes in The X-Files (Season 7) episode "Je Souhaite", written and directed by Vince Gilligan. In 2006, director Kevin Smith called on Weisman to appear in his now cult classic film, Clerks II, and in 2010, director Rob Reiner hired him to play Aidan Quinn's character's younger, mentally challenged brother, Daniel Baker, in Flipped. In 2012, Weisman played the recurring role of the mysterious Mr. Blonde, opposite Jason Issacs in the NBC show Awake. Other television work includes the recurring role of the deferential minion, Dreg, on Joss Whedon's Buffy the Vampire Slayer, Roswell, ER, Frasier, JAG, The Pretender, The Drew Carey Show, Just Shoot Me, Chuck, Miami Medical, Ghost Whisperer, Moonlight, Fairly Legal, Felicity, Human Target, The Forgotten, The Glades, CSI, CSI: Miami, CSI: New York, Fringe, and October Road. Additional film work includes The Rock, Gone in 60 Seconds, Space Buddies, Unicorn City, Bending The Rules, and Undocumented.

In 2004, Weisman produced and acted in the independent feature film The Illusion, directed by Emmy Award winner Michael Goorjian, and starring Hollywood legend Kirk Douglas. Illusion won the "Best Screenplay" award at the 12th Annual Hamptons International Film Festival, and was an official selection of the 16th Annual Palm Springs International Film Festival. An avid poker player, Weisman appeared on Bravo's Celebrity Poker Showdown. A drummer since age 12, Weisman has kept the back-beat for the band Trainwreck, with Kyle Gass of Tenacious D (with Jack Black).

Weisman's voice was featured in radio and television ads for such companies as Nike, Coca-Cola, and AT&T. He was also the voice of Honda cars and trucks for over three years.

Weisman has appeared on both the Entertainment Weekly "Must List" (2006), and on the TV Guide "Top 10 Scene Stealers" list a total of three times. He has been nominated for a Teen Choice Award twice for his work on Alias (best side-kick), and Marvel's Runaways once (Best Drama). He and the cast of Alias took home a People's Choice award after their first season for Best New Show. In 2002, Weisman and the rest of the Alias cast were nominated for a Best Drama Golden Globe Award.

In 2021, Weisman started the 'Did We Do It' podcast alongside former Trainwreck bandmate Kyle Gass.

== Philanthropy ==
In 2004, Weisman was a participant in the first-ever national television advertising campaign supporting donations to Jewish federations. The program featured "film and television personalities celebrating their Jewish heritage and promoting charitable giving to the Jewish community". Additional charities Weisman is actively involved in include The Children's Defense Fund, the DMD Fund (supporting the fight against Duchenne Muscular Dystrophy), Save The Children, Broadway Cares, Wheels For Humanity, Bet Tzedek (a non-profit law-firm that provides free legal services to low-income, disabled and elderly residents of Los Angeles Country), The Melanoma Research Foundation, and The Clear View Treatment Center, which provides a residential treatment program for adolescent boys who have been neglected, abused and abandoned.

== Personal life ==
Weisman lives in Los Angeles in the Hollywood Hills (not far from his childhood home in Encino), and has three sisters. He is a vegan, and has been practicing yoga for over twenty years. In 2005, he married Jodi Tanowitz, a preschool teacher, in a Jewish ceremony, with whom he had two daughters; Maya Rose Weisman (b. 2006) and Ellie Samantha Weisman (b. 2008). The couple divorced in 2011, and co-parent their daughters.

== Filmography ==
=== Television ===
Year	Title	Role	Notes
1995	Frasier	Painter	Episode: "Kisses Sweeter Than Wine"
1997	The Weird Al Show	Spike	Episode: "Bad Influence"
1997	Pauly	Burger	8 episodes/series regular
1997	Just Shoot Me!	Neil	Episode: "The Experiment"
1997	Beverly Hills Family Robinson	Brinx	TV movie
1998	ER	Glenn Karkowski	Episode: "Exodus"
1998	The Drew Carey Show	Carl	Episode: "Drew and the Conspiracy"
1998	Maggie Winters	Harold	Episode: "Dinner at Rachel's"
1999	JAG	Jerry Kemp	Episode: "The Adversaries"
1999–2000	Roswell	Larry Trilling	4 episodes/recurring
2000	Felicity	Earl	3 episodes/recurring
2000	Love & Money	Eddie	Episode: "Puff the Magic Sister"
2000	The Pretender	Mr. Abel	Episode: "Meltdown"
2000	The X-Files	Anson Stokes	Episode: "Je Souhaite"
2001	Gideon's Crossing	Mr. Ryan	Episode: "The Crash"
2001	Charmed	Lukas	Episode: "Sin Francisco"
2001	Two Guys, a Girl and a Pizza Place	Lost & Found employee	Episode: "An Eye for a Finger"
2001	In a Heartbeat	Distressed Man	Episode: "Star Struck"
2001	First Years	PI Richard Wad	3 episodes/recurring
2000–2001	Buffy the Vampire Slayer	Dreg	4 episodes/recurring
2001–2006	Alias	Marshall Flinkman	105 episodes Nominated–Teen Choice Award for Choice TV Sidekick (2003, 2005)
2006	Ghost Whisperer	Dennis Hightower	Episode: "The Ghost Within"
2007	Moonlight	Steve Balfour	4 episodes/recurring
2007	Chuck	Reardon Paine	Episode: "Chuck Versus the Truth"
2007	October Road	Duncan Bow	Episode: "How to Kiss Hello"
2007	Business Class	G. Glenn Ross	TV movie
2008	CSI: NY	Mike Hess	Episode: "The Box"
2009	Numb3rs	Bus Driver	Episode: "Jacked"
2010	The Forgotten	Ziipper	Episode: "Double Doe"
2010	Human Target	Martin Gleason	Episode: "Lockdown"
2010	CSI: Miami	Ricky Spano	Episode: "Meltdown"
2010	Miami Medical	Moose	Episode: "Man on the Road"
2010	Fringe	Gemini	Episode: "6955 kHz"
2011	CSI: Crime Scene Investigation	Craig Higgins	Episode: "Man Up"
2011	The Glades	Ben Pershing	Episode: "Welcome to Gibtown"
2012	Fairly Legal	Danny Martin	Episode: "Shine a light"
2012	Awake	Ed Hawkins	4 episodes/recurring
2013	Perception	AUSA Todd Erlich	Recurring
2013	Hello Ladies	Kives	Main cast/series regular
2014	Hello Ladies: The Movie	Kives/main cast	TV movie
2015	Better Call Saul	Stevie	Episode: "Hero"
2015	The Blacklist	Dr. Jeffrey Maynard	4 episodes/recurring
2015	Kingdom	Eddie Rayburn	Episode: "New Money"
2015–2017	Scorpion	Ray Speiwack	12 episodes/recurring
2016	The Blacklist	Dr. Jeffrey Maynard	2 Episodes : "The Vehm" "Quon Zhang"
2016	Heartbeat	Dr. Brenneman	Episode: "What Happens in Vegas...Happens"
2016	Goliath	Ned Berring	6 episodes/recurring
2017–2019	Runaways	Dale Yorkes	Main cast
2020	The Insiders	Randall	Episode: "Tiger Forum"
2025	Suits LA	Lester Thompson	Recurring role
2026	Reacher	Russell Plum	Recurring role

=== Film ===
Year	Film	Role	Notes
1994	Ollywoo	Brad Resnick	
1994	Cage II	Cab Driver	
1996	The Rock	Tourist	Uncredited
1999	Man of the Century	Squibb	
2000	Robbers	Director	
2000	Gone in 60 Seconds	Intern #2	
2000	More Dogs Than Bones	Arlo	
2001	Lip Service	Jade	
2002	Buying the Cow	Cabdriver	
2004	Sweet Underground	Film Director	
2004	Illusion	Kay	
2006	Clerks II	Hobbit Lover	
2008	Bohica	Nasty	
2009	Space Buddies	Dr. Finkel	Video
2009	Level 26: Dark Origins	Josh Banner	Short
2009	Undocumented	Jim	
2010	Flipped	Daniel Baker	
2011	Unicorn City	Jeff	
2012	Bending the Rules	Gil	
2016	The Trust	Roy	
2022	Call of the Clown Horn	Xander	Short
