= Koutoulas =

Koutoulas is a surname. Notable people with the surname include:

- Georgios Koutoulas, Greek footballer and a coach
- Asteris Koutoulas, Greek-Romanian event/music producer, publicist, translator, filmmaker and author
