= Casey Tebo =

American film producer and director

- Born: Casey Patrick Tebo; New Bedford, Massachusetts
- Occupations: Screenwriter, director, film producer

Casey Tebo is an American film producer and director from Boston, Massachusetts. He began his career directing music videos and live concert films, working extensively with major artists including Aerosmith, Mötley Crüe, Judas Priest, Radiohead, Velvet Revolver, Run-DMC, Jennifer Hudson, The Avett Brothers, Stevie Nicks, Jason Aldean, Bob Seger and more. He has also directed live broadcast segments and specials for Disney/ESPN, the NFL, MTV, VH1, and ABC, including Dick Clark’s Rockin’ Eve, Fashion Rocks, and Hard Rock Cafe’s London Calling.

In 2016, Tebo wrote and directed the dark comedy thriller Happy Birthday. He followed with the documentary Steven Tyler: Out on a Limb (2018), an intimate portrait of Aerosmith frontman Steven Tyler. In 2019, he co-produced Changeland, the directorial debut of Seth Green. In the fall of 2021, Tebo directed the sci-fi horror action film Black Friday, starring Bruce Campbell and Devon Sawa; the film received mostly positive reviews and holds a 65% rating on Rotten Tomatoes, with praise from The New York Times, IGN, and several genre publications. In 2024, he directed Megadeth: Behind the Mask, a feature documentary exploring the legacy of the heavy metal band Megadeth, released in cinemas on January 22, 2026 selling over 70,000 tickets and generating close to 1 million in ticket sales in one night.

== Career ==
A graduate of Apponequet Regional High School who later studied filmmaking at Southern Connecticut State University, and the now closed BFVF in Boston, Tebo was working as a graphic artist and designed some of Aerosmith's official shirts as he was discovered by the band's singer Steven Tyler, who invited him to film one of their upcoming concerts. The footage was eventually approved to be used on the live album Rockin' the Joint, which Tebo edited alongside English music director Dick Carruthers. Tyler was impressed and asked Tebo to become their road documentarian.

Prior to becoming a director, Tebo was a graphic artist, collaborating with Outkast, Radiohead, Deep Purple, Kid Rock, Slash and Stone Temple Pilots. He's been published in Rolling Stone, Spin, and Playboy.

His first narrative short film entitled The Captivus 2.0 was released in March 2011, and played at the 2012 Cannes Film Festival and the Seattle International Film Festival. The sets and costumes were constructed entirely of recycled materials. The short gained attention online, receiving praise and social media attention from Joss Whedon, Seth Green, Zachary Levi, and producer Adi Shankar.

In 2013 Tebo's first feature film was released, a concert film entitled Rock For The Rising Sun. The film tells the story of Aerosmith's journey to Japan shortly after the Fukushima Daiichi nuclear disaster of 2011. Tebo knew it would be a hard sell to Sony Music and Aerosmith management as the band was notorious for not releasing long form videos. Tebo shot the documentary footage while on tour with the band, combined with the live performances, and put the film together without telling anyone. He flew to Los Angeles and screened the film for Steven Tyler and Joe Perry, who insisted it immediately be put out for release.

In 2014, Tebo wrote and directed his first narrative feature film entitled Happy Birthday, released in 2016.

In the spring of 2015, Tebo won an Emmy as a segment director for his work on ESPN2's E: 60 Special Dream On: Stories of Boston’s Strongest.

Tebo has directed 8 episodes of the TV series CMT Crossroads: "Randy Travis and The Avett Brothers", "Lady Antebellum and Stevie Nicks", "The Band Perry and Fall Out Boy", "Dierks Bentley and One Republic", "Kacey Musgraves and Katy Perry", "John Legend and Lee Ann Womack", and "Bob Seger and Jason Aldean".

=== Recent projects ===
In 2017–2018 Tebo wrote two feature-length scripts, Mad Bastard from an original story by British writer, Christopher Bell. The film was in development at Millennium Films. In the spring of 2017, Tebo partnered with Producer Paul Schiff on an original science fiction script The Carrier that he wrote.

In 2019 Tebo and Thompson's Vermilion Entertainment secured their first scripted television show at Universal Cable Productions, a reimagining of Alfred Hitchcock Presents written by Patrick Macmanus.

In 2019 Tebo was credited as a producer on his friend Seth Green's directorial debut, Changeland, though in press Tebo has said he offered little more than "moral support"

In 2020 Tebo directed a feature documentary on the troubling state of legal cannabis and CBD industries in the United States entitled Barely Legal. It was produced by Michael Thompson, the younger brother of Tebo's producing partner Todd Thompson.

In 2020 via Instagram Tebo announced he had signed a contract to direct the alien invasion thriller Black Friday starring Bruce Campbell, Michael Jai White, and Devon Sawa. Filming took place in Boston in the fall/winter of 2020.

In the spring of 2024, Tebo was asked by his friend and Cross Creek Pictures owner, Tyler Thompson, to start developing smaller niche and genre titles (more aligned with Tebo's sensibilities) for the company. Via Twitter, Tebo said he was actively looking for the best genre projects, and hoped to bring exciting directors and actors to the table.

== Sources ==
- Variety
- Deadline
- Fox Boston.
- Website
- GeekNation
- IMDB
