= No Lie =

No Lie may refer to:

- "No Lie" (2 Chainz song), 2012
- "No Lie" (Sean Paul song), 2016
- "No Lie", a 2020 song by Everglow from Reminiscence

== See also ==
- No Lies, a 1973 short film by Mitchell Block
