= Marianna Yablonskaya =

Soviet writer, playwright, and theater actress and director

- Born: February 9, 1938; Leningrad, Soviet Union
- Died: 10 November 1980 (aged 42); Moscow, Russia
- Occupations: Theater actor, theater director, writer, playwright
- Writing career
- Genres: Fiction, drama, plays

Marianna Yablonskaya (Russian: Марианна Викторовна Яблонская) (1938–1980) is a Russian/ Soviet writer, playwright, theater actress and theater director. She was an actress at the Mayakovsky Theatre and the Lensoviet Academic Theatre.

== Biography ==
Yablonskaya was born in Leningrad in 1938, daughter of Viktor Yablonsky (Виктор Яблонский), a Moscow Art Theater actor and director. In 1959 she graduated from A. N. Ostrovsky Leningrad Theatrical Institute, L. F. Makarev's course. She was one of the leading actors of Lensovet Theater in Leningrad,

Her most notable role in theatre is Negina in "Talents and Admirers" by Alexander Ostrovsky, staged by Maria Knebel at the Mayakovsky Theater in Moscow.

Her most famous play, Plush Monkey in a Crib (The Role) was staged at the Gogol Theatre in Moscow.

== Personal life ==
Yablonskaya married a rocket scientist, Arkady Yarovsky. Their daughter, Marianna Yarovskaya, is a filmmaker who works in the United States. Her 2018 short documentary film, Women of the Gulag, was nominated for an Oscar.

== Selected works ==
She wrote 11 plays and two books of short stories, including:

=== Books ===
- (1984). Focusi/ Tricks. Moscow: Soviet Writer. 30,000 copies. 216 pages.(in Russian)
- (1992). Summer is Over/ Leto Konchilos. Short stories, play. Afterword by Sergey Yursky. - Moscow: Olimp/ Soviet Writer. 339 pages. ISBN 5-265-02498-0 (in Russian)
- (2016). Sdaeshsia?/Surrender? Ripol Classic. Foreword by Sergey Yursky, articles by Marianna Yarovskaya and Yuri Nagibin. ISBN 538608965X (in Russian)

=== Plays ===
- Ozhog (in Russian)
- Plushevaia Obeziana v Detskoi Krovatke (in Russian)
- Black April (in Russian)
