= Punk's Dead =

2016 American Drama/Comedy film directed by James Merendino

- Poster
- Directed by: James Merendino
- Written by: James Merendino
- Produced by: Andrea Kreuzhage
- Starring: Ben Schnetzer; Hannah Marks; Colson Baker; Sarah Clarke; Devon Sawa; Michael A. Goorjian; Adam Pascal; James Duval
- Cinematography: Thomas L. Callaway
- Edited by: James Merendino
- Production company: Liberty Spikes Productions
- Distributed by: Cinedigm
- Release date: February 11, 2016
- Running time: 75 minutes
- Country: United States
- Language: English

Punk's Dead (also known as Punk's Dead: SLC Punk 2) is a 2016 American comedy-drama film written and directed by James Merendino. It is a sequel to the 1998 film SLC Punk! and was released on February 11, 2016.

Set 19 years after the events of the first film, the plot deals with unresolved conflict and family strain, and also has elements of a coming-of-age story. Michael Goorjian reprises his role of Heroin Bob, acting as a narrator for the film, both in voice-over as well as sporadically intercut scenes of him in the afterlife.

== Plot ==
Ross is the child of Trish and Heroin Bob, having been conceived shortly before Bob's drug overdose. He has been raised alone by Trish, above her steam punk curio and clothing boutique. As a result of his mother's adoration of the macabre, as well as his immersion in the concept of death from a young age (his father's), he develops into a Victorian Goth. Despite his obvious affiliation, Ross insists that he is part of no social cliques, which is stressed even further when he states that despite a lifelong abstinence from drugs, alcohol, and sex he is not straight edge either.

Upon having his heart broken by his first girlfriend, Ross attempts to drown his sorrows, as well as his lifelong espousal that romantic love is trivial, with the aid of beer and liquor. In an attempt to further help him take his mind off of things, he also begrudgingly goes on a road trip to a punk rock concert with his only friend, Crash, as well as Crash's friend Penny. Ross has a low opinion of punks, despite his association with them, as Crash and Penny are punk rockers like his father.

As Ross is on the road with Crash and Penny, the situation is made known to Trish by Crash's mother. After being told that her only son was being extremely emotional and went to get drunk with Crash and go to a punk show, Trish becomes consumed with genuine concern for her son. She also has overwhelming anxiety, being that the last time she saw Bob alive, he was crying and drunk. Bob also notes distress from the afterlife by pointing out that alcoholism runs in the men in his family, and it's never turned out well for any of them.

Trish calls around to see if anyone has seen Ross and ultimately enlists the help of John and Sean, former friends of his Bob's, to help find him. In the 19 years that have transpired, both men have changed drastically from the first film. John has become the frontman of a black metal band as well as owning a black metal record store. He also no longer goes by the nickname of "John the Mod", instead going by his stage name of Johnny Jackyll. Sean voluntarily checked himself into a psychiatric rehabilitation center after the first film’s events left him homeless and psychologically fractured by drug use. Since his release, he has found work with a Utah state senator, though he still retains his punk mentality and love of punk music.

After some debate as to where Ross may have gone, Sean points them in the direction of the concert that he believes they may be going to, and they are picked up by Eddy, another of Bob's old friends. Tensions flare between Sean and Eddy en route concerning the latter's profession. Eddy has become the proprietor of a very successful strip club as well as owning and operating a "tease" website, that is modeled after Suicide Girls. Sean accuses Eddy of being a parasite who exploits women for profit and says he is no different than a common pimp.

Along the way to the show, Ross is made aware of his outwardly callous and pompous attitude towards others by Penny, which unsettles him, and he decides to change. He spots a man by the side of the road and has Penny pull over to offer him a ride, showing a consideration for others. They approach the man, a Rastafarian named William, who accepts their offer and proceeds to tell them that he is standing there as a result of a "pick up.” As Ross is preoccupied, William opens his backpack and reveals to Crash and Penny several pounds of hallucinogenic mushrooms within. Ross approaches, and a combination of hunger, drunkenness, and complete ignorance of drugs leads him to grab a large handful and consume them before anyone can stop him. William assures an immediately alarmed Crash and Penny that "Him won't die, but him will fly!”They proceed to head down the road as the mushrooms kick into gear for Ross, Crash, and William. Penny begrudgingly abstained so she could drive.

Later in the day, Ross is roused from his drug-induced sleep by Crash as they are parked at a gas station. William has departed before Ross comes to, and he regrets not saying goodbye to him. As the three are talking, a voice shouts to them, and Penny snaps her head around to see her father who has stopped for gas. After a violent encounter ensues between the two, Penny destroys her father's truck and exposes his sexual abuse of her. The three then speed off without further incident.

Finally reaching the concert, Ross, who is still under the influence of mushrooms and alcohol, lets his inhibitions go; he joins Crash in the slam pit and interacts socially with the other punks in attendance. He continues to ride his feelings of excitation and decides to act on them by approaching Penny, who he has been growing feelings for, to ask her out. With her previous revelation of abuse, which has led to her own failures in otherwise healthy relationships, she rejects the possibility of anything happening between them. She sees Ross' true worth and affirms that if she were to let herself, she would fall in love with him, which scares her. As Ross is crushed but understanding, Penny rethinks her choice and kisses him passionately as Crash approaches excitedly to see his two friends both happy.

In his euphoria, Ross climbs onto the stage during Extreme Corporal Punishment's set, and after grabbing the microphone, tries to convey to the annoyed crowd that he loves all of them despite their differences. However, his attempt at unity comes out as an unintentional insult regarding his perceived redundancy and materialism of punk rock and punks in general, and he is pulled off the stage and attacked by the crowd. As Crash and Penny do their best to help Ross, John and Sean arrive and run to their aide, and they are successful in getting Ross outside where Trish and the others are waiting.

Ross and his mother have a confrontation wherein she demands to know why he is making such irregular and reckless decisions. Ross assures her that everything is alright and that he finally knows who he is. She rejects this and pushes further, comparing his actions to his father's, which spurs Ross to angrily disparage his father, causing Trish to slap him. Ross walks away with Penny and Crash after telling his mother that he is moving out. Sean intercedes and quells the situation by telling Trish that she has been overbearing on Ross his whole life, out of a fear of losing him like she lost Bob and has never let him be a kid. She has unknowingly forced Ross to fill his father's shoes in a sense, and he has never really been free to develop on his own. He alludes to the fact that it is her own post traumatic stress disorder that has led to a great deal of the conflict in that she has never been able to let Bob go and move on with her life. She resists but breaks down and admits that she wants to let Bob go, but she can't because he left her alone with Ross and broke her heart. Ross approaches, embraces his mother, and their relationship is repaired.

Bob ends the film by stating that even though everyone is letting go, moving on and living life, in the end, he's still dead, "So, fuck you!"

== Cast ==
- Ben Schnetzer as Ross
  - Canyon Canary as young Ross
- Hannah Marks as Penny
- Colson Baker as Crash
- Sarah Clarke as Trish
- Devon Sawa as Sean
- Michael A. Goorjian as Heroin Bob
- Adam Pascal as Eddie
- James Duval as John
- Jenny Jaffe as Shelly
- Emma Pace as Lilith
- Levi Wilson as Dorgon
- Errol Grant as William
- Jarrod Phillips as Penny's father
- Patrick Delvar as Jerry

== Production ==
=== Development ===
In April 2013, director James Merendino announced that a sequel to SLC Punk! titled Punk's Dead would begin filming later in the year and would be released in 2014 with most of the original cast reprising their roles. One scene of the film was successfully funded by an Indiegogo campaign for publicity launched on October 27, 2013, and completed on January 15, 2014. Merendino said of the sequel, "I made SLC Punk! when I was a kid, and accordingly, the story is naive, and, as just a coming of age story, not finished. The characters are facing big questions, 18 years later, as outsiders, punk rockers… What relevance do they have in a world where all statements have already been made? In the years since I made SLC Punk!, it has found a rather large and supportive following who have been very kind to me. So in making a sequel, I feel I owe it to those people to really do it right." Also in April, Jenny Jaffe confirmed she was cast in the film as Shelly.

=== Casting ===
In May 2014, the film was announced to be shooting in June, with its cast officially announced to include Devon Sawa, Michael A. Goorjian, Adam Pascal and James Duval returning as Sean, Heroin Bob, Eddie and John the Mod, respectively, with Ben Schnetzer appearing as Heroin Bob's son, Ross, Colson Baker as Crash, and Hannah Marks and Sarah Clarke will portray the female leads. Also in May, Matthew Lillard, who starred in the original film announced that he would not be reprising his role from the first film through social media.

=== Filming ===
Filming commenced in June 2014 in Salt Lake City, Utah and concluded on June 21, 2014. A trailer for the film was released in July 2014. In May 2015, the film distribution rights were sold at the Cannes Film Market.

The punk show that is portrayed in the film was an actual full length concert that was arranged specifically for filming, and took place on June 20, 2014, at The Complex, in downtown Salt Lake City. The bands that were featured on the bill, and appearing on screen are; Screeching Weasel, Ulteriors, Dog Party, Eight Bucks Experiment (as Extreme Corporal Punishment), as well as the Dwarves, whose song "Let's Fuck!" is featured prominently in the film during the concert, as well as their song "Salt Lake City" being used in most promotional trailers. The Complex was also the location that was used for the Goth club where Ross meets Lillith.

Trish's fictional steam punk boutique, Dearly Departed, as well as John's record shop, Warrior Music, was filmed within Crone's Hollow, a store which sells religious goods and other items. The store is located at 3834 Main Street in South Salt Lake, although it's portrayed as being within Ogden, which is 40 miles north of Salt Lake City.

Bob's apartment scenes were filmed on location at the Utah Arts Alliance, an art collective building, located at 663 100 S., in Salt Lake City, down the street from the Clark Planetarium. The location of Bob's grave was filmed within Rotary Glen Park, located at 2903 Kennedy Drive in Salt Lake City.

== Release ==
The film was released in one theater on February 11, 2016, at The Gateway in Salt Lake City. The film is available for digital download on February 16, 2016, and was released on home media on March 8, 2016. The film had commenced streaming on Netflix on August 5, 2016.
