= Show Bitch =

- Film poster
- Directed by: Nikos Zervos
- Screenplay by: Vera Dickey
- Produced by: Michalis Panagiotopoulos; Vassilis Alatas
- Starring: Anna Rezan; Renos Haralampidis; Nassos Pappas; Dimitris Poulikakos; Nikos Ziagos
- Cinematography: Odysseas Pavlopoulos
- Edited by: Filip Chalatsis
- Music by: Nikos Terzis; Billy Nikolopoulos; Giannis Zouganelis
- Production companies: The Greek Film Center; Metavision
- Release dates: 5 December 2010 (Thessaloniki); 7 December 2010 (Greece)
- Running time: 90 minutes
- Country: Greece
- Language: Greek

Show Bitch is a 2010 comedy musical film by Nikos Zervos. The film is a parody of show business starring Anna Rezan, Renos Haralampidis and Dimitris Poulikakos. The costumes of the film were made by Bianca Nikolareizi.

The film premiered at the 2010 Thessaloniki International Film Festival, and opened in Greek theatres on 7 December 2010.

== Plot ==
A teenage, beautiful and talented singer/songwriter Hrysa is discovered by a successful music industry guru Protonotarios who turns her into a star using media tricks and scandals, of which is that he tries to do a match making between her and his client Jay who is a pop idol, very handsome, young and not really talented.

== Cast ==
- Anna Rezan as Hrysa
- Renos Haralampidis as Protonotarios
- Nasos Pappas as Jay
- Nikos Ziagos as Stelios
- Dimitris Poulikakos as Chief
- Kostas Gousgounis as Solon
