= River Made to Drown In =

River made to Drown In
- DVD cover
- Directed by: James Merendino (Note: Credited as Alan Smithee.)
- Written by: Paul Marius
- Starring: Michael Imperioli; Richard Chamberlain; Ute Lemper; James Duval; Austin Pendleton
- Cinematography: Thomas L. Callaway
- Edited by: Esther P. Russell
- Distributed by: Picture This! Entertainment
- Release date: 1997
- Running time: 98 minutes
- Country: United States
- Language: English

River Made to Drown In is a 1997 drama film starring Michael Imperioli, Richard Chamberlain, Ute Lemper and James Duval. Although directed by James Merendino, Merendino had his name removed, and the film is credited to Alan Smithee. River Made to Drown In failed to secure U.S. theatrical distribution, and it was released on DVD and has appeared on here! television.

== Plot summary ==
Allen is a struggling artist who had formerly worked as a male prostitute. He has left that life behind and is involved with Eva his art dealer. His life is upset by the arrival of Thaddeus, a wealthy lawyer near death from AIDS. Allen had for a time been Thaddeus's "kept boy" and Thaddeus has come to Allen to die. Before he dies, however, he wants Allen to help him find Jaime, another young hustler who had taken Allen's place with Thaddeus. Thaddeus is worried that he's infected Jaime with HIV and says he wants to care for him financially.

The film follows Allen's efforts to fulfil Thaddeus's final wishes while struggling to maintain his relationship with Eva and avoid the temptation of being drawn back into his former life on the streets.

== Cast ==
- Richard Chamberlain as Thaddeus MacKenzie
- Michael Imperioli as Allen Hayden
- Ute Lemper as Eva Kline
- James Duval as Jaime
- Austin Pendleton as Billy
- Talia Shire as Jaime's Mother
- Mike Starr as Frank
- Richard Riehle as Heavyset Man
- Michael Saucedo as Luis
- James Karen as Ray
- Michael Kearns as Arthur
- Michael O'Hagan as Jack
- Lewis Arquette as Vagabond
- Paul Marius as Turk
- Jon Powell as Martin

== DVD release ==
River Made to Drown In was released on Region 1 DVD on July 1, 2003.
