= Black Friday (2021 film) =

- Theatrical release poster
- Directed by: Casey Tebo
- Written by: Andy Greskoviak
- Produced by: Bruce Campbell; Warner Davis
- Starring: Devon Sawa; Ivana Baquero; Ryan Lee; Stephen Peck; Michael Jai White; Bruce Campbell
- Cinematography: David Kruta
- Edited by: Chris Tonick
- Music by: Patrick Stump
- Production companies: MFW Manufacturing; The Warner Davis Company
- Distributed by: Screen Media Films
- Release date: November 19, 2021
- Running time: 84 minutes
- Country: United States
- Language: English
- Box office: $1,581

Black Friday is a 2021 American horror comedy film written by Andy Greskoviak and directed by Casey Tebo. It stars Devon Sawa, Ivana Baquero, Ryan Lee, Stephen Peck, Michael Jai White, and Bruce Campbell (who serves as producer).

== Plot ==
A parasitic organism attacks All-Mart employee Monty as he prepares the store for its Black Friday sale. Monty mutates into a monster and attacks two coworkers.

Because he has to work on Thanksgiving, Ken Bates drops off his daughters Lyla and Gracie for dinner with their mother and her new husband Grant. Ken then picks up his nebbish coworker Chris Godecki and drives to their late shift at We Love Toys. While anxious shoppers assemble outside, Ken and Chris join coworkers Marnie, Brian, Archie, Ruth, Emmett, Anita, and Bircher as they get ready to open the store for Black Friday. Bircher accidentally locks himself outside the building while smoking a cigarette. Possessed by a parasite, a rabid shopper mauls Bircher, causing him to transform into a creature too.

Store manager Jonathan Wexler has his employees open the doors. Shoppers pour in, but they gradually turn violent as the parasitic mutation spreads. Everyone eventually realizes that the shoppers are transforming into murderous creatures as they are attacked and forced to fight back. Possessed by a parasite, Emmett emits a tentacle that kills Anita. Emmett turns into a creature before fleeing toward the store's Santa's Village display.

Ruth holes up in the office while Archie leads Chris and Brian through a mutant horde to close an exit door before more shoppers get inside. Jonathan and Ken battle a creature in the bathroom. Marnie sneaks into Santa's Village and sees that transformed shoppers are being assimilated into a growing sac. Once the exit door is secured, Jonathan, Ken, Chris, Marnie, Brian, Archie, and Ruth regroup on the store floor. Driven by a possessed officer, a speeding police car crashes through the front window. The car runs over Ruth. Mutating shoppers begin pouring inside again. After he rescues Chris, one of the monsters kills Archie.

Ken, Marnie, Chris, Brian, and Jonathan barricade themselves in the storeroom. While talking about their various tenures at the store, the coworkers bond over sliced turkey meat. However, the group conversation turns confrontational when Ken and Chris argue about their disappointing stations in life and Marnie calls out Ken for not having a real romance with her. A mutant breaches the storeroom. Ken gets bitten in the commotion. Presuming he is now infected and will soon transform, Ken stays behind while Chris, Marnie, Jonathan, and Brian go to the loading dock to obtain a truck for escaping. With Chris unable to start the truck, he and the others fight off another mutant before making their way to the roof. Meanwhile, the building catches fire as the main sac continues growing into a massive monster that soon fills the entire store. Jonathan sacrifices himself to a horde so Chris, Marnie, and Brian can escape back down to the ground.

Brian confesses he bit Ken in the earlier commotion, so Ken is not actually infected. Having assimilated all of the mutated shoppers, the massive monster breaks through the store's roof. Brian tries to confront the creature, but it kills him. Ken rejoins Chris and Marnie outside. Ken acts as a distraction while Chris tricks the monster into swallowing a forklift, which causes the injured creature to collapse into the fire. Ken, Chris, and Marnie escape in Ken's car. However, more massive monsters are seen emerging from other stores in the distance.

== Cast ==
- Devon Sawa as Ken
- Ivana Baquero as Marnie
- Ryan Lee as Chris
- Stephen Peck as Brian
- Michael Jai White as Archie
- Bruce Campbell as Jonathan
- Louie Kurtzman as Emmett
- Celeste Oliva as Anita
- Ellen Colton as Ruth
- Peg Holzemer as Angry Gran
- Mark Steger as Monster Angry Gran
- Christopher Mikael as Lou
- Stanley Bruno as Bircher
- Lonnie Farmer as Monty
- Ripley Thibeault as Lyla
- Matea Thibeault as Gracie
- Seth Green as Dour Dennis (voice)

== Production ==
On November 17, 2020, Bruce Campbell, Devon Sawa and Michael Jai White joined the cast. Filming took place between November 16 – December 16, 2020, in Babies R Us North Attleboro, MA.

== Release ==
Black Friday was theatrically released on November 21, 2021, by Screen Media Films.

=== Critical reception ===
On the review aggregator website Rotten Tomatoes, 65% of 17 critics' reviews are positive, with an average rating of 5.70/10. Brian Tallerico from RogerEbert.com gave it two stars out of four and wrote, "It's an easy watch in a B-movie marathon but you'll have forgotten it by the time you're done with the Thanksgiving leftovers." Lena Wilson, writing for The New York Times, said "this is exactly the kind of thing horror lovers should watch with like-minded friends as the holidays roll".

Worldwide, Black Friday was the seventh most pirated film online between November 22 and November 28, 2021.

=== Box office ===
As of April 7, 2024, Black Friday grossed $1,581 in the United Arab Emirates.
