= Steve Stanulis =

American film director

- Born: Staten Island, New York, U.S.
- Occupations: Actor, director, and producer

Steve Stanulis (born November 25, 1971) an American actor, director, producer, and podcast host. A former New York City police officer and Chippendales performer, his screen credits include The Sopranos, The Deuce, Great Kills, Fifth Borough, and Lazarus Syndrome. He directed Monica, which won at the Venice Film Festival, and is associated with the podcasts Screw the Clout and Bulletproof True Crime.

== Early life and education ==
Stanulis was born in Staten Island, New York. He went to New Dorp High School and went on to graduate from Wagner College.

He studied acting at Manhattan's HB Studios.

== Career ==
Stanulis is a former NYPD policeman. He retired from the force in 2002. He was a Chippendales dancer at Savage Men Dance Troupe. He made his name by writing about his time as the bodyguard of Kanye West from 2016 to February 2021. Stanulis is of Italian-Lithuanian descent. He was the bodyguard of Kanye West from 2016 – February 2021. He also worked with Kanye West at his "SNL" meltdown and events in New York Fashion Week and the Met Gala.

As a producer, Stanulis produced short films like Dick & Jane, Because of You, and the feature film The Invisible Life of Thomas Lynch.

Stanulis produced the comedy-drama The Networker.

As an actor, he was cast in The Replacements and Gangs of New York, The Interpreter, I Now Pronounce You Chuck & Larry, Cupidity, and Over the GW. He has also appeared in TV shows like The Sopranos and The Deuce.

As a director, Stanulis directed Wasted Talent in 2018. It won Best Documentary at the NYCIF. He then directed a horror film called Clinton Road. The film won Best Horror in both the Golden Statuette International Film Festival (GSIFF) and the Philadelphia Independent Film Festival. It was picked up by Midnight Releasing and had a 15 state theatrical release. He also directed a controversial documentary called Race Against Time.

Stanulis also directed and produced films like 5th Borough and Chronicle of a Serial Killer.

As of March 2023 Stanulis continues to produce and star in Great Kills directed by James Merendino.

== Controversy ==
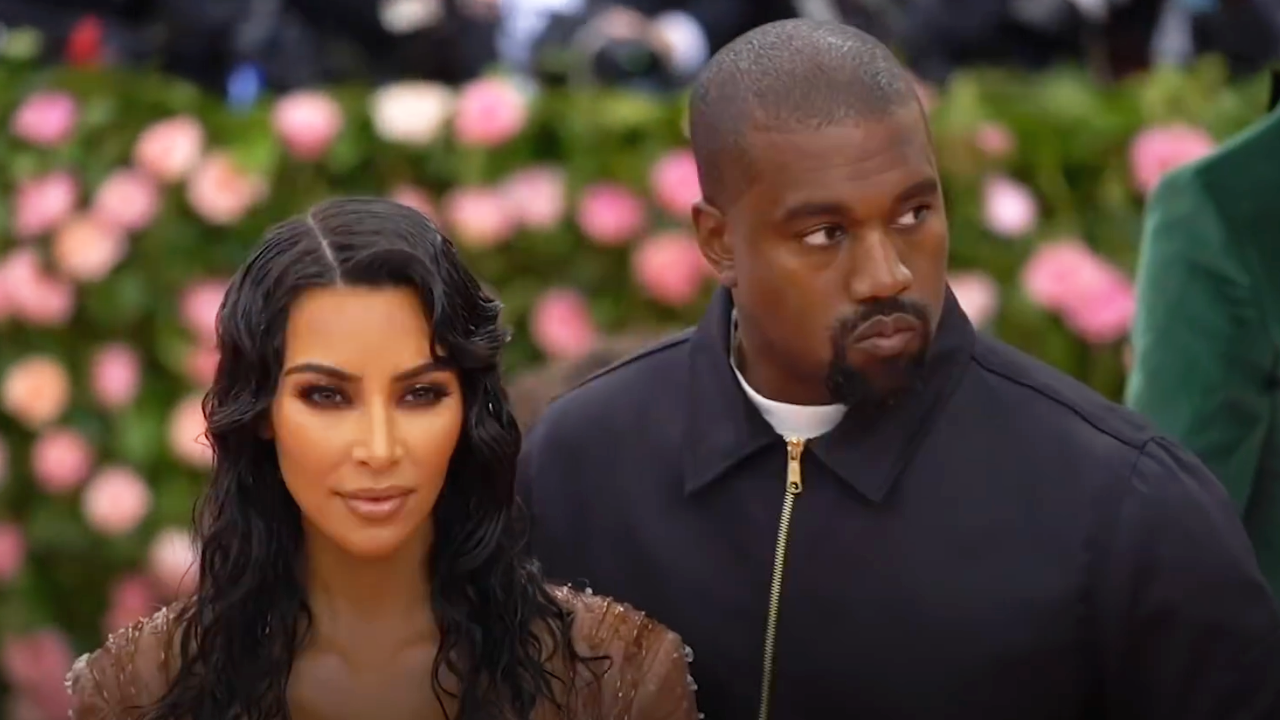
Kim Kardashian with then-husband Kanye West in 2019

Stanulis was involved in a controversy that involved Kim Kardashian and Kanye West. West accused him of flirting with Kardashian. West threatened him with a $30 million suit, which he claimed that Stanulis agreed to confidentially.

The former couple gave him a cease-and-desist letter that claimed he made false and defamatory statements, but Stanulis' legal team threatened to countersue.
