= Paul Roderick Gregory =

American economist (born 1941)

Paul Roderick Gregory (born 10 February 1941 in San Angelo, Texas) is a professor of economics at the University of Houston, Texas, a research fellow at the Hoover Institution and a research fellow at the German Institute for Economic Research. He has written about Russia and the Soviet Union.

He received his B.A. in 1963 and M.A. in 1964 from University of Oklahoma and his Ph.D. in economics from Harvard University in 1969. Gregory's book Women of the Gulag inspired an Oscar-shortlisted film of the same name, directed by Marianna Yarovskaya.

== Publications ==
- Women of the Gulag: Stories of Five Remarkable Lives, Hoover Institution Press, 2013
  - Histories of five women of diverse geographical, social, and ethnic origins: Agness Argipopulo, Maria Senotrusova, Evgenia Feigenberg, Adile Abbas-ogly, and Fekla Andreeva.
- Politics, Murder and Love in Stalin's Kremlin: The Story of Nikolai Bukharin and Anna Larina, Hoover Institution Press, 2010
- Terror by Quota: State Security from Lenin to Stalin, Yale University Press, 2009
- (co-editor) "ГУЛАГ: Экономика принудительного труда", Moscow, Rosspen Publishers, 2008.
- Lenin’s Brain and Other Tales from the Secret Soviet Archives, Hoover Institution Press, 2008
- The Political Economy of Stalinism, Cambridge University Press, 2004 (Ed A Hewett Book Prize)
- Russian and Soviet Economic Performance and Structure, Addison-Wesley, 2001, with Robert C. Stuart
- Principles of Macroeconomics, Addison-Wesley, 2001, 7th edition, with Roy J. Ruffin
- Before Command: An Economic History of Russia from Emancipation to First Five-years Plan, Princeton University Press, 1994
- Restructuring the Soviet Economic Bureaucracy, Cambridge University Press, 1990.
- Russian National Income. 1885-1913, Cambridge University Press, 1982

== See also ==
- Women of the Gulag
