= James Merendino =

American film director and screenwriter (born 1969)

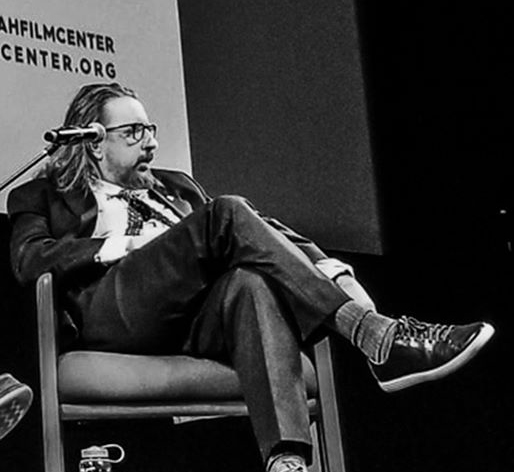
- Merendino at a Q&A in September 2019
- Born: James Anthony Merendino; January 11, 1969 (age 57); Long Branch, New Jersey
- Occupations: Film director, film producer, screenwriter actor
- Years active: 1991–present
- Notable work: SLC Punk!
- Partner: Severine Ferarri

James Anthony Merendino (born January 11, 1969) is an American film director and screenwriter. He is best known for writing and directing the dramedy film SLC Punk!.

== Life ==
Merendino was born in Long Branch, New Jersey, and moved to Salt Lake City when he was six years old. He graduated from Judge Memorial Catholic High School in 1985 and went to college in Rome and Los Angeles where he studied Western philosophy and film. Merendino moved to Hollywood when he was 21 and found work with Hollywood mogul Dan Melnick.

In 2008 Merendino moved to New York City where he currently lives with his partner Severine Ferarri.

== Career ==
In 1991, Merendino was hired to direct Witchcraft IV: The Virgin Heart. His fourth film, Toughguy (1995), is a psychological thriller starring Heather Graham. His next film was A River Made to Drown In (1997). Merendino's most successful film, SLC Punk!, was released in 1998, and was a semi-autobiographical telling of his growing up in Utah. The screenplay was nominated for an Independent Spirit Award.

The 2000 film Magicians was a European co-production with Alan Arkin and Claire Forlani. Amerikana was part of the Dogma 95 movement by Lars Von Trier. Merendino directed (with Lisa Hammer) the drama film The Invisible Life of Thomas Lynch in 2009. He wrote and directed the sequel to 1998's SLC Punk!, Punk's Dead, which was released in February 2016.

In 2022, James Merendino created and directed the television series Great Kills produced by and starting Steve S. Stanulis. The dark comedy mockumentary about a small time hit man on Staten Island was co-created with Lisa Hammer and released on Tubi in March of 2023. The series was renewed for another season shortly after it aired.

== Filmography ==
=== Film ===
| Year | Film | Director | Writer | Producer |
|---|---|---|---|---|
| 1992 | Witchcraft IV: The Virgin Heart | Yes | Yes | No |
| 1993 | Witchcraft V: Dance with the Devil | No | Yes | No |
| 1993 | Beware of Dog | No | Yes | No |
| 1994 | Hard Drive | Yes | Yes | No |
| 1994 | The Upstairs Neighbour | Yes | Yes | No |
| 1995 | Terrified | Yes | Yes | No |
| 1996 | Livers Ain't Cheap | Yes | Yes | No |
| 1996 | The First Man | No | No | Yes |
| 1997 | River Made to Drown In | Yes (Note: Credited as Alan Smithee) | No | No |
| 1998 | SLC Punk! | Yes | Yes | No |
| 2000 | Magicians | Yes | Yes | No |
| 2001 | Amerikana | Yes | Yes | No |
| 2004 | Evil Remains | Yes | Yes | No |
| 2008 | Death Club | Yes | Yes | No |
| 2009 | The Invisible Life of Thomas Lynch | Yes | Yes | No |
| 2011 | Pox | No | No | Yes |
| 2016 | Punk's Dead: SLC Punk! 2 | Yes | Yes | No |
| 2018 | Double Proposal | No | No | Yes |
| 2020 | Ashes | No | Yes | No |
| TBD | Cat in a Box | Yes | Yes | No |
| TBD | Arthur Kill Road | Yes | Yes | No |

=== Television ===
| Year | Series | Director | Writer | Producer | Actor | Notes |
|---|---|---|---|---|---|---|
| 1998 | Alexandria Hotel | Yes | Yes | Yes | No | 8 episodes |
| 2023 | Great Kills | Yes | Yes | Yes | Yes | 8 episodes |

== Awards ==
2000 Nominated Independent Spirit Award Best Screenplay for: SLC Punk! (1998)
