= Amerikana =

- Directed by: James Merendino
- Written by: James Merendino; Michael A. Goorjian
- Story by: Drew Hammond
- Produced by: Peter Aalbæk Jensen; Sisse Graum Jørgensen; Sonya Chang; Katrina Fernandez
- Starring: Michael A. Goorjian; James Duval
- Cinematography: Isabell Spengler
- Music by: Robyn Hitchcock; Elmo Weber
- Production companies: Cologne Filmproduction; ApolloMedia; Gemini Film; Zentropa Film ApS
- Distributed by: Olive Films
- Release date: May 15, 2007
- Running time: 95 minutes
- Countries: United States; Germany; Denmark
- Language: English

Amerikana is a comedy-drama film written and directed by James Merendino. A sort of free homage-remake of Easy Rider (1969), it was the thirteenth film created under Dogme 95 rules. Although produced in 2001, it wasn't released until 2007.

== Plot ==
When philosophy student Peter (Goorjian) is abandoned by his Danish girlfriend in Los Angeles, his friend Chris (Duval) invites him to South Dakota to claim a Harley Davidson he has inherited from an uncle. After he finds out it is an Italian Vespa, Chris decides to take it to L.A. anyway with a reluctant Peter, and they embark on a cross-country journey that allows them to explore the US and discover the nature of people and their own contradictions.

== Production ==
A low-budget production, the film was shot on a cross-country, 3 and a half week shoot on digital video.
