= Poster Girl (film) =

2010 American short film

- Directed by: Sara Nesson
- Produced by: Mitchell Block and Sara Nesson
- Starring: Robynn Murray
- Cinematography: Sara Nesson
- Edited by: Geof Bartz
- Music by: Miriam Cutler
- Production company: Portrayal Films
- Distributed by: Virgil Films and Entertainment
- Release date: September 3, 2010 (Telluride)
- Running time: 38 minutes
- Country: United States
- Language: English

Poster Girl is a 2010 American short documentary film about an American soldier's experience with posttraumatic stress disorder after returning from the Iraq War. The film showed at the 37th Telluride Film Festival on September 3, 2010. It was named as a nominee for the Academy Award for Best Documentary (Short Subject) at the 83rd Academy Awards on January 25, 2011, but lost to Strangers No More.

The film is a production of Portrayal Films and was conceived and produced by Mitchell Block and directed and photographed by Sara Nesson.
