= Greedy Lying Bastards =

- Directed by: Craig Rosebraugh
- Written by: Craig Rosebraugh; Patrick Gambuti, Jr.
- Produced by: Jeremy Chilvers; Patrick Gambuti, Jr.; Craig Rosebraugh; Marianna Yarovskaya
- Narrated by: Craig Rosebraugh
- Cinematography: Carl Bartels
- Edited by: Patrick Gambuti, Jr.
- Music by: Michael Brook
- Production company: One Earth Productions
- Distributed by: One Earth Productions/Lambert Releasing
- Release dates: October 19, 2012 (United Nations Association Film Festival); March 8, 2013 (United States)
- Running time: 89 minutes
- Country: United States
- Language: English
- Box office: $45,000

Greedy Lying Bastards is a 2012 American documentary film directed by Craig Rosebraugh. The film explores the phenomenon of climate change denial.

== Content ==
Greedy Lying Bastards investigates the climate change misinformation campaign waged by the petroleum industry and its funded think tanks. The film exposes how a small number of well-paid spokespeople have worked to confuse the public and lawmakers on the issue. Both ExxonMobil and Koch Industries are identified in the film as two of the worst culprits funding the denial campaign. In addition to exposing the denial campaign, Greedy Lying Bastards tells the stories of those currently impacted by changing climate. These include residents of Kivalina, Alaska who are faced with relocation due to erosion of shorelines caused from rising temperatures and those in Tuvalu facing sea level rise. "The film also covers the 2012 Colorado wildfires, drought in Kansas [part of the wider 2010–13 Southern United States and Mexico drought] and Hurricane Sandy."

== Production ==
Greedy Lying Bastards was directed, produced and narrated by Craig Rosebraugh. He co-wrote the film with two-time Emmy Award winning editor Patrick Gambuti, Jr., who also served as editor. Daryl Hannah was an executive producer and Michael Brook, who wrote the score for An Inconvenient Truth, was the composer.

In making the film Rosebraugh sought to "undertake a project that would uncover the hidden agenda of the oil industry and provide answers as to why we as a nation fail to implement clean energy policies and take effective action on important problems such as climate change."

The film began production in 2009 and finished late in 2012.

== Release ==
Greedy Lying Bastards was released theatrically in North America on March 8, 2013, where it grossed $45,000. Disinformation released it on home video January 14, 2014, and it grossed another $73,537 in North American sales.

== Reception ==
Rotten Tomatoes, a review aggregator, reports that 67% of 36 surveyed critics gave the film a positive review; the average rating is 6.2/10. The site's consensus reads: "It's not particularly subtle, but Greedy Lying Bastards is effective in questioning the motives of climate change deniers." Metacritic rated it 56/100 based on 14 reviews.

=== Awards ===
- 2012 Burbank Film Festival Best Documentary Feature
- 2012 Boston Film Festival Eco Award

=== Other festivals ===
- 2013 Reykjavik International Film Festival, Official Selection
- 2013 Beijing International Film Festival, Official Selection
- 2013 Environmental Film Festival (Washington D.C.), Official Selection
- 2012 United Nations Association Film Festival, Official Selection
- 2012 Bahamas International Film Festival, Official Selection
- 2012 Costa Rica International Film Festival
