= SLC Punk! =

1998 film by James Merendino

- Theatrical release poster
- Directed by: James Merendino
- Written by: James Merendino
- Produced by: Sam Maydew; Peter Ward
- Starring: Matthew Lillard; Michael Goorjian; Annabeth Gish; Jennifer Lien; Christopher McDonald; Devon Sawa; Adam Pascal; Jason Segel; Til Schweiger
- Cinematography: Greg Littlewood
- Edited by: Esther P. Russell
- Music by: see below
- Production companies: Beyond Films; Blue Tulip Productions; Straight Edge
- Distributed by: Sony Pictures Classics
- Release dates: September 24, 1998 (German); April 16, 1999 (US)
- Running time: 98 minutes
- Country: United States
- Language: English
- Box office: $299,569

SLC Punk! is a 1998 American comedy-drama film written and directed by James Merendino. The film centers around Steven "Stevo" Levy, a college graduate and punk living in Salt Lake City during the mid-1980s.

SLC Punk! was chosen as the opening-night feature at the 1999 Sundance Film Festival.

Merendino created the film based on his experience growing up in Salt Lake City. Although the film is not autobiographical, Merendino has said that many characters were based on people he knew.

== Plot ==
The film outlines the daily life of a punk named Stevo in Salt Lake City, Utah, in the fall of 1985. Stevo's best friend, "Heroin" Bob, is also a punk. The nickname "Heroin" is ironic, as Bob is afraid of needles and actually believes that any drug (with the notable exception of alcohol and cigarettes) is inherently dangerous.

Stevo and Bob go from party to party while living in a dilapidated apartment. They spend much of their time fighting with members of other subcultures, particularly rednecks. Stevo has a casual relationship with a girl named Sandy, while Bob is in love with Trish, the owner of a head shop.

The two of them are shaped by their experiences with their parents. Stevo's parents, now divorced, are former hippies who are proud of their youthful endeavors; however, Stevo is revolted by what he perceives as their "selling out" by becoming affluent professionals, which they try to justify. Stevo's grades are excellent, and when his father sends an application to Harvard Law School and Stevo is accepted, he nevertheless rejects it because of his beliefs. By contrast, Bob's father is a mentally ill alcoholic who mistakes his son and his friend for Central Intelligence Agency operatives and chases them away with a shotgun when they visit him on his birthday.

Stevo begins to see the drawbacks of living the punk life. Sean, a fellow punk, was a drug dealer who once attempted to stab his mother while under the influence of an entire 100-dose sheet of acid; in the present, Stevo finds him panhandling on the street with some obvious mental issues.

While Stevo understands that his relationship with Sandy is casual, he is still enraged when he discovers her having sex with another man and savagely beats him, later loathing himself because his action contradicts his own belief in anarchism. His social circle also begins to drift away, as his dealer, Mark, and his friend, Mike, both leave Salt Lake City (Mark to return to Miami, Mike to attend the University of Notre Dame). Soon after, Stevo attends a party and falls in love with a rich girl named Brandy, who points out that his clothing and hair are fashion as opposed to true rebellion. Rather than being offended, Stevo takes the criticism thoughtfully, and they passionately kiss.

At the same party, Bob complains of a headache (induced by Spandau Ballet's "She Loved Like Diamond" playing on a stereo), and is given Percodan, which he consumes with alcohol after being told the pills are simply "vitamins" that will help his headache. The accidental drug overdose kills him in his sleep. When Stevo discovers Bob's body, he breaks down completely. At the funeral, he appears with a shaved head and changed clothing, having decided he is done with being a punk. He plans to go to Harvard, and earlier narration suggests that he eventually marries Brandy. He notes in his closing narration that his youthful self would probably kick his future self's ass, wryly describing himself as having been ultimately just another poser.

== Cast ==
- Matthew Lillard as Steven "Stevo" Levy
  - Christopher Ogden as Young Steven "Stevo" Levy
- Michael Goorjian as Bob "Heroin Bob" Williams
  - Francis Capra as Young Bob "Heroin Bob" Williams
- Jason Segel as Mike
- Annabeth Gish as Trish
- Jennifer Lien as Sandy
- Christopher McDonald as Mr. Levy
- Devon Sawa as Sean "The Beggar"
- Adam Pascal as Eddie "Mod Eddie"
- Til Schweiger as Mark
- James Duval as John "The Mod"
- Summer Phoenix as Brandy

== Production notes ==
The film was shot primarily on location in Salt Lake City, Utah, with one sequence filmed in Evanston, Wyoming.

Director James Merendino employed a kinetic visual style, including sweeping crane shots, rapid dolly moves, and jump cuts, to reflect the chaotic energy of the punk subculture portrayed in the film.

Notable Salt Lake City landmarks featured in the film include:

- West High School, standing in for the fictional “Southeast High.”
- Presidents Circle at the University of Utah, used in a confrontation scene.
- The Cottonwood Mall (since demolished), where Stevo delivers his "Who Started Punk Rock?" monologue and Sean interviews for a job.
- Memory Grove Park, where Stevo and Sandy take LSD.
- The Cathedral of the Madeleine, which appears in Heroin Bob’s funeral sequence.
- Several downtown locations, including Market Street near the Frank E. Moss Federal Courthouse, were used for exterior shots.

== Soundtrack ==
SLC Punk!

Soundtrack album by Various
- Released: March 16, 1999
- Genre: Punk rock
- Label: Hollywood Records

1. "I Never Promised You a Rose Garden" - The Suicide Machines (originally performed by Billy Joe Royal)
2. "Sex and Violence" - The Exploited
3. "I Love Livin' in the City" - Fear
4. "1969" - The Stooges
5. "Too Hot" - The Specials
6. "Cretin Hop" - Ramones
7. "Dreaming" - Blondie
8. "Kiss Me Deadly" - Generation X
9. "Rock N' Roll" - The Velvet Underground
10. "Gasoline Rain" - Moondogg
11. "Mirror" - Fifi (originally performed by The English Beat)
12. "Amoeba" - The Adolescents
13. "Kill the Poor" - Dead Kennedys

Eight Bucks Experiment, the band portraying fictional English band ECP, were featured on a European release of the soundtrack. The three songs they recorded live for the punk concert scene were sent back to the band after filming. They self-released the songs on the One Of These Days EP through their Blue Moon Recordings label website.

== Release ==
=== Box office ===
The film premiered in the United States at the Sundance Film Festival on January 22, 1999. It received a wide release on April 16, 1999, grossing $36,218 on its opening weekend and amassing a total domestic gross of $299,569 by the time it left theaters.

=== Critical reception ===
On review aggregator website Rotten Tomatoes, the film holds an approval rating of 65% on 57 reviews. The website's critics consensus reads: "Merging anarchic spirit with straightforward melodrama, SLC Punk is a hit-and-miss odyssey of youthful rebellion elevated by Matthew Lillard's dramatically potent star turn." Metacritic assigned the film a weighted average score of 50 out of 100, based on 21 critics, indicating "mixed or average reviews".

Roger Ebert of the Chicago Sun-Times gave the film three-out-of-four stars, praising Lillard's performance and writing that the film offers "a little something there for all of us". Janet Maslin, writing for The New York Times, called the film "likable for its outlandishness, less so when it shows a self-important streak". Dennis Harvey of Variety called it "energetic but poorly structured", writing that the film "doesn't quite grasp how its slick, flashy package undermines any actual punk cred". Nathan Rabin of The A.V. Club wrote that "S.L.C. Punk! takes a potentially fascinating subject and reduces it to a mawkish compendium of film-festival clichés". David Luty of Film Journal International wrote a mostly negative review of the film, stating that it "cannot quite reach the richer depths it grasps for, because it doesn't have the material to support the large dramatic distance Stevo has to travel".

== Sequel ==
In April 2013, director James Merendino announced that a sequel to SLC Punk! titled Punk's Dead would begin filming later in the year and would be released in 2014 with most of the original cast reprising their roles. The film was successfully funded by an Indiegogo campaign launched on October 27, 2013, and completed on January 15, 2014. Merendino said of the sequel, “I made SLC Punk! when I was a kid, and accordingly, the story is naive, and, as just a coming of age story, not finished. The characters are facing big questions, 18 years later, as outsiders, punk rockers… What relevance do they have in a world where all statements have already been made? In the years since I made SLC Punk!, it has found a rather large and supportive following who have been very kind to me. So in making a sequel, I feel I owe it to those people to really do it right."

In May 2014, the film was announced to be shooting in June, with its cast officially announced to include Devon Sawa, Michael Goorjian, Adam Pascal and James Duval returning as Sean, Heroin Bob, Eddie and John the Mod, respectively, with Ben Schnetzer appearing as Heroin Bob's son, Ross, Machine Gun Kelly as Crash, and Hannah Marks and Sarah Clarke portraying the female leads. Also in May, Matthew Lillard and Jason Segel, who starred in the original film, announced through social media that they would not be reprising their roles.

== Comic book adaptation ==
In 1998, SLC Punk! was adapted into a comic book, illustrated by Dean Haspiel.
