= Michael A. Goorjian =

American actor and director (born 1971)

- Born: February 4, 1971 (age 55); San Francisco, California, U.S.
- Occupations: Actor, film director, writer
- Years active: 1991–present

Michael A. Goorjian (born February 4, 1971) is an American actor, filmmaker, and writer. Goorjian won an Emmy Award for Outstanding Supporting Actor in a Miniseries or Special for his role as David Goodson in the television film David's Mother (1994). He is also known for his role as Justin, Neve Campbell’s love interest on the series Party of Five (1994–2000), as well as Heroin Bob in the film SLC Punk! (1998) and its sequel, Punk's Dead (2016). As a director, Goorjian achieved recognition for his first major independent film, Illusion (2004), which he wrote, directed and starred in alongside Kirk Douglas. In 2022, Goorjian wrote, directed, and starred in Amerikatsi, an Armenian-language feature that premiered to strong critical acclaim and was selected as Armenia’s submission for the Best International Feature Film category at the 96th Academy Awards.

== Biography ==
=== Acting ===
Goorjian was born and raised in the San Francisco Bay Area. His father, Peter, is Armenian, with his paternal grandparents being survivors of the Armenian genocide; his mother, Sarah, is of Scottish-American descent. Goorjian grew up in Oakland, California, and attended Bishop O'Dowd High School, which had a strong drama program. At the age of 14, he decided to audition for a local theatre company, thinking it was a ‘cool way’ to skip class; after successfully landing the lead role in a 'not-so-cool' play called Computer Crazy, Goorjian soon found out that the rest of the cast were all senior citizens and that he would have to perform the play at his own junior high school. Despite this seemingly rather humiliating experience, Goorjian stuck with acting, eventually training at UCLA’s School of Theatre, Film and Television.

Goorjian won an Emmy Award for Outstanding Supporting Actor in a Miniseries or Special for the TV movie David's Mother (starring Kirstie Alley). Ray Loynd commented that Goorjian contributed "a wealth of physical and emotional detail that underscores the familial havoc".

Goorjian’s first big Hollywood break came as a dancer when, in 1992, he was cast as ‘Skittery’ in the Disney film Newsies (starring Christian Bale and Robert Duvall). What followed were roles in numerous subsequent films, including Chaplin (with Robert Downey Jr.), Forever Young (with Mel Gibson), the Oscar-nominated Leaving Las Vegas, Hard Rain (with Morgan Freeman and Christian Slater), SLC Punk! (with Devon Sawa), The Invisibles (with Portia de Rossi), Broken (with Heather Graham) and Conversations with God.

Goorjian has also guest-starred in a number of television series, including Lie to Me, House, Alias, Monk, CSI: Crime Scene Investigation, Without A Trace, and Chicago Hope, as well as a recurring role on Life Goes On (as Ray Nelson).He had a recurring role on Party of Five as Justin Thompson.He also appeared in the 2005 TV film Reefer Madness, a satirical musical adaptation of the anti-marijuana propaganda film from the 1930s.

=== Theater ===
Goorjian is a founding member of the Los Angeles-based theater group Buffalo Nights, and starred in the West Coast-premiere of Dennis McIntyre’s drama Modigliani (which won him an L.A. Weekly Theater Award nomination for Best Lead Actor). He played the title roles in both productions of The Apollo of Bellac (by Jean Giraudoux) and J.B. (by Archibald MacLeish). Goorjian also won at the L.A. Critics’ Choice Awards and the Garland Backstage West Awards for his original choreography for the L.A. production of the musical Reefer Madness.

=== Director ===
Goorjian made his first real foray into directing with the mock-documentary Oakland Underground, a comedy about an underground occult music scene in Oakland, CA. From there, Goorjian made Illusion with Kirk Douglas, which was released theatrically in 2006 after racking up over a dozen festival awards, including Best Screenplay at The Hampton’s International Film Festival, Best Feature at the Lake Tahoe International Film Festival and The Audience Award at the Sonoma International Film Festival. With Illusion Goorjian was critically lauded for his ability to blend great filmmaking with philosophical depth. Soon after Illusion, Goorjian began collaborating with the publishing company Hay House to produce and direct a number of films including the documentary You Can Heal Your Life (2007), starring metaphysical author and teacher, Louise L. Hay and The Shift, starring author Dr. Wayne Dyer, along with Michael DeLuise and Portia de Rossi. His most recent work with Hay House is an original film anthology called Tales of Everyday Magic, which explores meaningful philosophical ideas through intimate character-driven stories.

Additional directing credits include the short film Players’ Club, which swept the 2006 Elevate Film Festival in Los Angeles, including Best Director and The War Prayer, an adaptation of Mark Twain’s short story by the same title starring Jeremy Sisto. Occasionally, Goorjian also moonlights directing a circus/cabaret show in Eastern Europe called Palazzo.

=== Writing ===
Goorjian debuted as a novelist with his work What Lies Beyond the Stars, the first book in an intended trilogy commissioned by Hay House Publishing. The second book in the series, Beyond the Fractured Sky, will be released in the fall of 2018.

In the 2020s, Goorjian returned to feature filmmaking with Amerikatsi (2022), a project he wrote, directed, and starred in. Shot on location in Armenia, the film follows an Armenian-American navigating life under Soviet rule in the postwar era. Amerikatsi screened at several international festivals, including the Seattle International Film Festival and the Woodstock Film Festival, and received positive reviews from outlets such as Variety and ScreenDaily. Armenia selected the film as its official submission for the Best International Feature Film category at the 96th Academy Awards.

== Filmography ==
=== Short film ===
Director

- Blood Drips Heavily on Newsies Square (1991)
- Call Waiting (1998)
- Players' Club (2006)
- The War Prayer (2007)

Actor

Year	Title	Role
1991	Shelf Life	Adam
1997	Screening	
2014	Green Thumb	Dad
2018	Pin-Up	Guy

=== Feature film ===
Year	Title	Director	Writer	Producer	Notes
1997	Oakland Underground	Yes	Yes	Yes	
1999	The Invisibles	No	No	Yes	
2002	The Mesmerist	No	Yes	No	
2004	Illusion	Yes	Yes	No	
2007	You Can Heal Your Life	Yes	No	No	Documentary film
2009	The Shift	Yes	No	No	Direct-to-video
2011	Part Time Fabulous	No	No	Yes	
2012	The Magic Hand of Chance	Yes	No	No	
2012	Tales of Everyday Magic	Yes	Yes	No	
2012	Painting the Future	Yes	No	No	
2012	My Greatest Teacher	Yes	Yes	No	
2022	Amerikatsi	Yes	Yes	Yes	

Actor

Year	Title	Role	Notes
1992	Newsies	Skittery	
1992	Forever Young	Steven	
1992	Chaplin	Charles Chaplin Jr	
1995	Leaving Las Vegas	College Boy #1	
1998	Hard Rain	Kenny	
1998	SLC Punk!	Bob	
1998	Art House	Danny Farthing	
1999	The Invisibles	Jude	
1999	Something More	Sam	
1999	Do Not Disturb	Billy Boy Manson	
1999	How to Get Laid at the End of the World	Michael	
1999	Here Lies Lonely	Sid	
1999	Deal of a Lifetime	Henry Spooner	
2001	Amerikana	Peter	
2002	The Mesmerist	Coroner #1	
2002	Go for Broke	Rome / Romie	
2003	Leisure	Barney	Direct-to-DVD
2004	Happily Even After	Stuart	
2004	Illusion	Christopher	
2005	Pomegranate	Jack	
2006	Conversations with God	Roy the Morning Boy	
2006	Broken	Thomas	
2008	Around June	Mr. Lewis	
2014	My Eleventh		
2016	Punk's Dead	Bob	
2022	Amerikatsi	Charlie	

=== Television ===
Year	Title	Role	Notes
1991	Growing Pains	Hank Miller	Episode: "Like Father, Like Son"
1991–1993	Life Goes On	Ray Nelson	8 episodes
1994	Sweet Justice	Jimmy	2 episodes
1994	Under Suspicion	Johnny	Episode: "Arson/Murder Story"
1994–2000	Party of Five	Justin Thompson	44 episodes
1997	Touched by an Angel	Budd Glaser	Episode: "Charades"
1998	Chicago Hope	Jacob Joffe	Episode: "Austin Space"
2001	CSI: Crime Scene Investigation	Aaron Pratt	Episode: "Caged"
2004	Without a Trace	Ricky Wilson	Episode: "Two Families"
2005	Alias	Andre Sterescu	Episode: "Nocturne"
2005	Monk	Jacob Carlyle	Episode: "Mr. Monk and the Kid"
2005	House	Sean Randolph	Episode: "Babies & Bathwater"
2005	Killer Instinct	Rafe Bradford	Episode: "Who's Your Daddy"
2006	CSI: Miami	John Stockman	Episode: "Darkroom"
2007	Eyes	Bobby Creech	Episode: "Innocence"
2009	Lie to Me	Franko James Vincent / Glen Welsh	Episode: "Secret Santa"
2014	Covert Affairs	Borz Altan	3 episodes
2016	Code Black	Emanuel	Episode: "The Fifth Stage"
2016	Lucifer	Elliot Richards	Episode: "Liar, Liar, Slutty Dress on Fire"
2023-2025	The Lincoln Lawyer	Alex Grant/Gazarian	Recurring Role (Seasons 2 & 4)

==== TV movies ====
Director

- Entanglement (2012)

Actor

Year	Title	Role	Notes
1991	Never Forget	Chuck	
1993	The Flood: Who Will Save Our Children?	Scott Chapman	
1994	David's Mother	David Goodson	Primetime Emmy Award for Outstanding Supporting Actor in a Limited Series or Movie
1994	Blind Justice	Soldier #1	
1999	Life in a Day	Dr. Peter Hamilton	
2005	Reefer Madness	Mickey Druther	
2007	Company Man	Jeff Greenwald	
2017	The Wizard of Lies	Dan Horwitz	
