= Happy Birthday (2016 American film) =

- Poster
- Directed by: Casey Tebo
- Written by: Casey Tebo
- Produced by: Sean McKittrick
- Starring: Matt Bush; Vanessa Lengies; Erik Palladino; Britne Oldford; Steven Tyler; Matthew Willig; Robert Miano
- Cinematography: Terry Hayes
- Edited by: Evan Schiff
- Music by: Robert DeLeo
- Production company: Darko Entertainment
- Distributed by: Orion Pictures; Momentum Pictures
- Release date: September 9, 2016
- Running time: 90 minutes
- Country: United States
- Language: English
- Budget: $500,000

Happy birthday

Happy Birthday is a 2016 American dark comedy horror-thriller film written and directed by Casey Tebo. The film stars Matt Bush and Riley Litman as two friends that travel to Mexico and end up getting kidnapped. Happy Birthday also stars Steven Tyler of Aerosmith as a shaman.

== Plot ==
Brady and Tommy have decided to travel to Mexico in search of drinks and debauchery to celebrate Brady's birthday and to help him get over his girlfriend's infidelity. Their vacation takes a dark turn after they pick up two American women, Katie and Lucia, who trick the two men and kidnap them as part of a scheme by the local drug lords to gain ransom money from their parents.

== Cast ==
- Matt Bush as Brady Baxter
- Riley Litman as Tommy Quinn
- Vanessa Lengies as Katie Elizondo
- Britne Oldford as Lucia Frankie Allen
- Erik Palladino as The Texican
- Matt Willig as El Caballo
- Steven Tyler as Kasape Sukka
- Robert Miano as El Gato Enfermo
- Tristin Mays as Janie
- Jeff Daniel Phillips as Frank Zappa
- Inanna Sarkis as Kasape Suka’s girlfriend

== Reception ==
The Los Angeles Times panned the film overall, writing that "Tebo brings some admirable ambition to this microbudget project" but that "from the overwritten, pop-culture-reference-laden dialogue to the incessant attempts to be shocking, “Happy Birthday” tries way too hard." The Hollywood Reporter also reviewed the movie, stating "A bizarre mixture of black comedy and horror/suspense, Happy Birthday is a juvenile effort that at least has the decency to make its American and Mexican characters look equally bad."

In contrast, the genre website Bloody Disgusting praised the movie and felt that "the sheer originality behind Happy Birthday makes up for most of its cinematic blunders" and that "Tebo’s direction and storytelling skills shine brightly in this flawed but compelling thriller."

== See also ==
- List of films featuring kidnapping
