= Illusion (2004 film) =

2004 film by Michael Goorjian

- Theatrical poster
- Directed by: Michael Goorjian
- Written by: Michael Goorjian; Ron Marasco; Chris Horvath; Tressa DiFiglia
- Based on: L'Illusion Comique by Pierre Corneille
- Produced by: James Burke; Scott Disharoon; Anahid Nazarian; Kevin Weisman
- Starring: Kirk Douglas; Michael Goorjian; Ron Marasco; Karen Tucker
- Cinematography: Robert Humphreys
- Edited by: Laurent Wassmer
- Music by: Chris Ferreira
- Production company: Entitled Entertainment
- Distributed by: Gaiam Media; Awakened Media; Slowhand Releasing
- Release dates: October 23, 2004 (HIFF); February 17, 2006 (United States)
- Running time: 106 minutes
- Country: United States
- Language: English

Illusion is a 2004 American drama film directed by Michael Goorjian in his feature directorial debut. The screenplay, written by Goorjian, Ron Marasco, Chris Horvath, and Tressa DiFiglia, is loosely based on Pierre Corneille's 17th-century play L'Illusion Comique. The film stars Kirk Douglas (in his final film role), Goorjian, Marasco, and Karen Tucker. It tells the story of a legendary film director who is shown three visions of the life of the son he never knew.

The film had its world premiere at the Hamptons International Film Festival on October 23, 2004, where it received the Screenwriting Award. It began a limited theatrical release in the United States on February 17, 2006.

== Plot ==
Film director Donald Baines lies dying alone in his private screening room, watching the films he has devoted his life to creating. Having isolated himself from family and friends, he now regrets many personal sacrifices. The rejection of his illegitimate child, Christopher, brings him the most pain, since Donald saw him only once, 30 years ago.

Late one night, Donald is awakened by the ghostly image of Stan, a favorite editor who has been dead more than 35 years. Suddenly Donald finds his deathbed transported to an old movie house. Stan informs Donald that he has come to help and that he will show him three films - three visions - each vision representing a different period of Christopher's life.

The first vision brings Donald into the teenage life of Christopher who is in the throes of his first brush with love. A rebel and a romantic, Christopher proclaims his love for a girl he has only seen from afar and chances it all for an opportunity to spend some time with her. A nagging voice, which sounds like the father he never knew, echoes in his head, telling him he is not worthy.

A wild romp marks the second vision of the twenty-something life of Christopher as he tries to escape an artistic maelstrom and finds himself face to face with the love he had for a brief moment and lost from the first vision. His life takes a brutal twist as he finds but again loses his love.

The last vision Donald sees is the return of Christopher now as a mature man, wearied from the difficult curveballs life has thrown him. Again looking for love, this is his last and perhaps only chance to rid himself of what he imagines to be his father's haunting disapproval.

== Cast ==
- Kirk Douglas as Donald Baines
- Michael Goorjian as Christopher Baines
- Ron Marasco as Stan
- Karen Tucker as Isabelle
- Richmond Arquette as Mortimer Malalatete
- Bryan Cranston as David Bennett
- Ted Raimi as Ian
- Eugeny Voronin as Vladimir
- Gibson Frazier as Interviewer
- Kevin Weisman as Kay
- Michael Kemmerling as Seymour
- Jayne Amelia Larson as Donna
- Theresa Walsh as Claire
- Robin Dearden as Diane
- Kristen Clement as Sara
- Scott Girish as Joe
- Ronald Víctor García as Andrew
- John Paul Goorjian as Val
- Jules Bruff as Renee
- Nancy Jeffries as Anastasia
- Steve Chabon as Bishop
- Marco Sanchez as Sanchez
- Maury Sterling as Grant
- Amy Grant as Carol
- Trina Oliver as Marlo
- Evan Arnold as Techie
- Dawn McCarthy as Dawn the Faun

== Production ==
On January 22, 2003, it was announced that Kirk Douglas had joined the cast of The Illusion for Entitled Entertainment. James Burke, Scott Disharoon, Anahid Nazarian, and Kevin Weisman served as producers on the film, which marked Michael Goorjian's directorial debut. It also marked Douglas' final screen appearance before his death in 2020.

Illusion was shot in Calistoga, Oakland, San Francisco, and Berkeley, as well as at Douglas' portions in Beverly Hills, California. Goorjian shot each sequence independently, beginning in 2001, and covered most of the film's budget. He hired his longtime friends Chris Horvath and Chris Ferreira as co-writer and composer, respectively.

== Reception ==
=== Critical response ===
On the review aggregator website Rotten Tomatoes, 36% of 11 critics' reviews are positive, with an average rating of 4.9/10.

Ronnie Scheib of Variety called the film "weirdly entertaining" and opined that it "is awash in impromptu romantic bits of business staged with flair and wit." She also wrote, "The saving grace of Illusion is that it is about acting: The similarities and contrasts between Goorjian's and Douglas' different thesping styles give a particular resonance to the hokey moral underpinnings of the plot."

Moira MacDonald of The Seattle Times stated, "The film suffers from not enough attention to the details: Some of the smaller roles are woodenly performed; much of the dialogue is self-conscious and ridden with coincidence. […] Despite its flaws, Illusion is enjoyable as a quiet ode to the magic of cinema; to the way that movies can lift our spirits and inspire us."

Mick LaSalle of the San Francisco Chronicle wrote, "Illusion wins points for originality. […] It's unlike anything else to come along in years" and "Douglas does his best acting while watching and reacting to what he sees on screen. If this ends up being his cinematic swan song, it will not have been a bad way to go."

=== Accolades ===
The film won the Screenwriting Award at the 12th Hamptons International Film Festival and the Audience Award at the 8th Sonoma Valley Film Festival. It won both the Jury and Audience Awards for the Best Feature Film at the 1st Inspiration Film Festival.
