= Mitchell Block =

American filmmaker (1950–2024)

- Publicity Photo of Mitchell Block
- Born: June 5, 1950; Cincinnati, Ohio, U.S.
- Died: May 30, 2024 (aged 73); Eugene, Oregon, U.S.
- Occupation: Filmmaker

Mitchell W. Block (June 5, 1950 – May 30, 2024) was an American filmmaker, primarily a producer of documentary films.

Block was the executive producer of the 2000 short documentary film Big Mama, which won Best Documentary (Short Subject) at the 73rd Academy Awards. He produced the 2010 film Poster Girl, which was nominated in the same category at the 83rd Academy Awards. He also produced The Testimony (2015) and executive produced Women of the Gulag (2018), which were shortlisted in the Best Documentary (Short Subject) category at the 88th Academy Awards and the 91st Academy Awards, respectively. In 2022, Block, among Anna Rezan, Kim Magnusson, and Zafeiris Haitidis, produced the feature documentary My People, which premiered to rave reviews in Los Angeles.

== Early life and education ==
Block was born in Cincinnati, Ohio, on June 5, 1950. He attended the Hun School of Princeton, graduating in 1968. He earned bachelor's and master's degrees in fine arts from the Tisch School of the Arts in New York University, where he majored in television and film production. In 1973, Block received the first Leo Jaffe Scholarship because of his student work as a producer. He earned an MBA from the Columbia Business School. He was a producing fellow at the American Film Institute Center for Advanced Studies, Beverly Hills and did work towards a doctorate at UCLA in film and television history, criticism, theory and business.

== Career ==
Block began to work in television and film. He became particularly interested in documentaries. He established his own company, Direct Cinema, in 1974, of which he was president. It produces and distributes films.

From 1980, Block sat on the 40-person Documentary Screening Committee of the Academy Awards. They nominate the short list of finalists for awards. In 2022, Block, among Anna Rezan, Kim Magnusson and Zafeiris Haitidis produced the feature documentary My People, which premiered to rave reviews in Los Angeles.

=== Conflict of interest claims ===
In 1990, a group of 45 filmmakers filed a protest to the Academy of Motion Picture Arts and Sciences over a potential conflict of interest involving Block. They noted that Block was a member of the Documentary Steering Committee, which selects films as nominees, but he had a conflict of interest because his company Direct Cinema owned the distribution rights to three of the five films (including eventual winner Common Threads: Stories from the Quilt) selected that year as nominees for an Academy Award for Best Documentary Feature. They noted that Michael Moore's Roger & Me (distributed by Warner Brothers) was omitted from the nominees, although it had been highly praised by numerous critics and was ranked by many critics as one of the top ten films of the year.

== Personal life ==
From 1978 - 2017, Block was an adjunct professor at the School of Cinematic Arts of the University of Southern California where he taught in The Peter Stark Producing Program. From 2017-2024, he served as the Jon Anderson Chair, Professor of Documentary Production and Studies at the University of Oregon, School of Journalism.

His moving image collection, the Direct Cinema/Mitchell Block Collection, is held at the Academy Film Archive.

Block died at his home in Eugene, Oregon, on May 30, 2024, at the age of 73.

== Filmography ==
Year	Title	Credit	Notes	Refs
1973	No Lies	Director	Short film; selected for National Film Registry in 2008; named one of ten best short films ever made by IndieWire in 2016	
2000	Big Mama	Executive producer	Documentary short; won Academy Award for Best Documentary (Short Subject)	
2018	Women of the Gulag	Executive producer	Documentary; shortlisted for Academy Award for Best Documentary (Short Subject) at 88th and 91st Academy Awards	
2008	Carrier	Creator, producer	Documentary series; broadcast on PBS and National Geographic Channel; Emmy Award for Best Cinematography (2009)	
2008	Another Day in Paradise	Creator, producer	Documentary; broadcast on PBS and National Geographic Channel	
2010	Poster Girl	Producer	Nominated for Academy Award for Best Documentary (Short Subject)	
2014–2022	FACE OF A NATION: What Happened to the World's Fair?	Producer	PBS documentary	
2015	The Testimony	Producer	Documentary; shortlisted for Academy Award	
2022	My People	Producer	Feature documentary; premiered in Los Angeles	
