= Women of the Gulag =

- Film poster
- Directed by: Marianna Yarovskaya
- Written by: Marianna Yarovskaya
- Produced by: Marianna Yarovskaya; Paul Roderick Gregory
- Edited by: Leonard Feinstein, Irina Volkova
- Music by: Mark Adler
- Production company: Mayfilms
- Release date: October 1, 2018
- Country: United States
- Language: Russian

Women of the Gulag is a 2018 US short documentary film directed by Marianna Yarovskaya. and based on the book Women of the Gulag: Stories of Five Remarkable Lives by Paul Roderick Gregory (2013). Executive Produced by Mitchell Block and Mark Jonathan Harris, it was a Best Documentary Short shortlist nominee at the 2018 Academy Awards.

== Synopsis ==
A collection of interviews with women who survived the Stalin's repression of the 1930s. The film was shot for five years, the team found its six heroines in the most diverse and remote corners of the former Soviet Union– in Ural, Far East, Sukhumi, and Moscow Oblast. Today, these women are well over eighty, but they continue to live, to tell their own story.

== Critical reception ==
The film was shortlisted for an Academy Award in the best documentary short category. The film premiered at the 41st Moscow International Film Festival in 2018. It won festivals in Iceland, US/California, South Korea, Hong Kong, France, Canada, Croatia, and Russia. The film was screened privately for Secretary of State George Shultz. The film won two awards at the «Window to Europe» festival, Vyborg, an EBS Award in Seoul, Korea, a Critics Choice Award in Hong Kong, among others. The film’s Russian TV premiere took place in May 2021, but the film was censored.
