= Victoria Larimore =

American film director

- Born: Lorain, Ohio, US
- Education: Washington University in St. Louis
- Occupations: Director; Writer; Producer
- Spouse: Michael Taylor (divorced 1991)
- Parents: Keith Larimore; Clarice Larimore
- Website: www.victorialarimore.com

Victoria Ann Larimore (born October 5, 1956) is an American film director, television director, producer, screenwriter, and playwright. A film she produced in 1992, "Saying Kaddish", received an Emmy nomination for Outstanding Directing - Special Class. The director who was nominated is Oren Rudavsky. She has also produced:The Amish: Not to Be Modern (1985), An Empty Bed (1990), Saying Kaddish (1992), and the film noir thriller, Room 32 (2002).

== Career ==
Larimore co-wrote a screenplay adaptation of Toni Morrison's The Bluest Eye with her then husband Michael Taylor. She went on to produce the Emmy nominated Saying Kaddish (1991), An Empty Bed (1990), Room 32 (2002), and has worked as a script and creative consultant on projects including the psychological thriller, 40 Sundays, directed by Geoffrey de Valois.

Larimore received the “Best Director, Comedy” award for Sawed in Half from the Noho Fringe Festival.The play, which she co-wrote with Andrea Mezvinsky who was crowned “America’s Funniest Mom” on The Oprah Winfrey Show, received positive reviews and premiered at the Complex Theatre in Hollywood in May 2016. It enjoyed a revival at the Acme Theatre, Noho, the following September.

== Personal life ==
She was born in Lorain, Ohio

She divorced from Michael Taylor in 1991.

== Filmography ==
=== Films ===
- Slumber Party, 1983 (writer/director/producer) - selected for viewing at the New York City Anthology Film Archives
- Gloria: A Case of Alleged Police Brutality, 1985 (writer) - dir. by Oren Rudavsky
- The Amish: Not to Be Modern, 1985 (director/producer)
- Bird/Bear, 1986 (co-director)
- An Empty Bed, 1990 (producer)
- Saying Kaddish, 1991 (producer)
- Pair of Jokers, 1992 (producer)
- Room 32, 2002 (director)

=== Television ===
- Alive from Off Center, 1989 (1 episode, writer), Ile Aiye/The House of Life
- Looking East, 1991 (2 episodes, writer/director/producer)
- The Hidden Realm, 2003 (writer/director/producer)
- Yue-Sai's World, 2006 (1 episode, writer/director/producer)
- Outlaugh!, 2006 (director)
- The Mage, 2015 (creator)

Larimore has also worked in theater, and served as "Director in Residence" at the GuerrilLA Theatre in Los Angeles, as well as premiering her self-directed play, Angel Dog, at The Producer's Club in Manhattan in 2010.
