= Devon Sawa =

Canadian actor (born 1978)

- Sawa in 2026
- Born: Devon Edward Sawa; September 7, 1978 (age 48); Vancouver, British Columbia, Canada
- Occupation: Actor
- Years active: 1989–present
- Spouse: Dawni Sahanovitch (m. 2013)
- Children: 2

Devon Edward Sawa (born September 7, 1978) is a Canadian actor. Born and raised in Vancouver, Sawa began his career promoting children's action toys. He made his film debut with a supporting role in Little Giants (1994) and received wide recognition for playing the title role as a human boy in Casper (1995). Sawa also had starring roles in the films Wild America (1997), SLC Punk! (1998), Idle Hands (1999), and Final Destination (2000).

Following his lead roles in the poorly received films Slackers and Extreme Ops (both 2002), Sawa acted in various direct-to-video independent film productions. He also played the title character in the Eminem music video "Stan" and was cast as Owen Elliot / Sam Matthews on the CW action drama series Nikita (2010–2013). Sawa experienced a career resurgence in the 2020s. He played multiple roles on the Syfy and USA Network horror series Chucky (2021–2024) and had a starring role in the horror film Heart Eyes (2025).

== Early life ==
Devon Sawa was born on September 7, 1978, in Vancouver, the son of Joyce and Edward Sawa, a mechanic. He has two older siblings. His father was of Polish descent, and his mother is "a little bit of everything".

== Career ==
Sawa began his career in 1992 at age 14 as a children's action toy spokesman. He made his film debut in Little Giants in 1994 and received wide recognition for playing the title role as a human boy in Casper the following year. In Now and Then (1995), Sawa played the town bully, Scott Wormer. He subsequently appeared in the films Wild America (1997), SLC Punk! (1998), Idle Hands (1999), and Final Destination (2000). In 2000, Sawa played the title character in the Eminem music video "Stan". He later did voice acting, voicing Flash Thompson in Spider-Man: The New Animated Series. Sawa continued to work steadily in the 2000s by appearing in several independent films, including Extreme Dating, Shooting Gallery, Devil's Den, Creature Of Darkness, Endure, 388 Arletta Avenue, The Philly Kid, and A Resurrection.

In 2010, Sawa portrayed Owen Elliott on The CW action drama series Nikita. In July 2012, he was promoted to series regular in the third season of Nikita; the show ended after four seasons in 2013. In 2016, Sawa played the lead role in Punk's Dead, a sequel to SLC Punk! by the same director, James Merendino. In 2017, he portrayed the role of Nico Jackson in Somewhere Between; the show ended after one season. In 2019, Sawa appeared as Lester Clark Jr. in Escape Plan: The Extractors. He also starred in the thriller The Fanatic, making his first appearance of wide release since 2002. He played Hunter Dunbar, an actor who is stalked by a character named Moose. The movie was directed by Limp Bizkit vocalist Fred Durst.

In 2020, Sawa returned to playing leading roles, starring in films like Hunter Hunter (2020) and Black Friday (2021), which both received favorable reviews.

In June 2022, Sawa gave a lengthy interview to The Independent, in which he said that he sought out roles in which the character smoked marijuana to help get away from his teen heartthrob status which began with Casper.

== Personal life ==
Sawa married Canadian producer Dawni Sahanovitch in 2013. They have two children together, a son born in 2014 and a daughter born in 2016.

Sawa has described himself as being irreligious, an atheist, and supportive of religious freedoms.

In a 2022 interview, Sawa said that between 2004 and 2009, he "drank a lot" until becoming sober after meeting his wife in Vancouver.

== Filmography ==
=== Film ===
Year	Title	Role	Notes
1994	Little Giants	Junior Floyd	
1995	Casper	Casper McFadden (Note: Human form only)	
1995	Now and Then	Scott Wormer	
1997	The Boys Club	Eric	
1997	Wild America	Mark Stouffer	
1998	A Cool, Dry Place	Noah Ward	
1998	SLC Punk!	Sean	
1998	Around the Fire	Simon Harris	
1999	Idle Hands	Anton Tobias	
2000	Final Destination	Alex Browning	
2000	The Guilty	Nathan Corrigan	
2002	Slackers	Dave Goodman	
2002	Extreme Ops	Will	
2004	Extreme Dating	Daniel Roenick	
2005	Shooting Gallery	Paul the Pawn	Direct-to-video
2006	Devil's Den	Quinn	Direct-to-video
2009	Creature of Darkness	Andrew	
2010	Endure	Zeth Arnold	
2011	Final Destination 5	Alex Browning	Archive footage; uncredited
2011	388 Arletta Avenue	Bill Burrows	Direct-to-video
2012	The Philly Kid	Jake	Direct-to-video
2013	A Resurrection	Travis Blair	
2014	A Warden's Ransom	Miller	
2015	The Exorcism of Molly Hartley	John Barrow	Direct-to-video
2015	Life on the Line	Duncan	Direct-to-video
2016	Punk's Dead	Sean	
2019	Escape Plan: The Extractors	Lester Clark Jr.	Direct-to-video
2019	The Fanatic	Hunter Dunbar	
2019	Jarhead: Law of Return	Ronan Jackson	Direct-to-video
2020	Disturbing the Peace	Diablo	
2020	Hunter Hunter	Joseph Mersault	
2020	Death Rider in the House of Vampires	Death Rider	Direct-to-video
2021	Black Friday	Ken Bates	
2022	Gasoline Alley	Jimmy Jayne	
2023	Who Are You People	Karl	
2024	Consumed	Quinn	
2024	All the Lost Ones	Conrad	
2025	Heart Eyes	Zeke Hobbs	
TBA	Return of the Living Dead	Issac Horton	
TBA	The Girl in the River		Filming

=== Television ===
Key
†	Denotes television productions that have not yet been released

Year	Title	Role	Notes
1989	Unsub	Young John Wesley	Episode: "And the Dead Shall Rise to Condemn Thee: Part 2"
1992–1994	The Odyssey	Yudo	3 episodes
1993	Sherlock Holmes Returns	Young James Moriarty Booth	TV film
1995	Lonesome Dove: The Outlaw Years	Hank Valen	Episode: "The Hanging"
1995–1996	Action Man	Additional voices	26 episodes
1996	Night of the Twisters	Dan Hatch	TV film
1996	Robin of Locksley	Robin McAllister	TV film
2003	Spider-Man: The New Animated Series	Flash Thompson	Voice, episode: "Flash Memory"
2010	NCIS: Los Angeles	Matt Bernhart	Episode: "The Bank Job"
2010–2013	Nikita	Owen Elliot / Sam Matthews	Recurring role (seasons 1–2); main role (seasons 3–4)
2015	Broad Squad	Patrick Byrne	TV film
2016	Real Detective	Eddie Herman	Episode: "Redemption"
2017	Somewhere Between	Nico Jackson	Main role
2018	Hawaii Five-0	Brad Woodward	Episode: "O Ka Mea Ua Hala, Ua Hala Ia"
2020	MacGyver	Donovan James O' Mailey	Episode: "Mac + Desi + Riley + Aubrey"
2021	Magnum P.I.	Robbie Nelson	2 episodes
2021–2024	Chucky	Logan Wheeler / Lucas Wheeler	Recurring role (season 1)
2021–2024	Chucky	Father Bryce	Recurring role (season 2)
2021–2024	Chucky	James Collins / Randall Jenkins	Main role (season 3)
2022	Hacks	Jason	Episode: "The Click"
2024	Murder in a Small Town	Gordon Murphy	Episode: "A Touch of Panic"
2025	Twisted Metal	Harold (Note: Human form only)	Episode: "VAVAVUM"
2026	Coven Academy	Mr. Peter Cole	Guest star
TBA	Hell Motel: Murder at Red Mountain †	Patrick	Main role

=== Music videos ===
Year	Title	Artist	Role	Notes
2000	"Stan"	Eminem	Stanley Mitchell	

== Awards ==
Year	Award	Category	Work	Result
1997	Young Artist Awards	Best Performance in a TV Movie / Mini-Series – Young Actor	Night of the Twisters	Nominated
1999	Teen Choice Awards	Most Disgusting Film Scene (Note: For the scene where Sawa's character in Idle Hands, Anton, discovers his cat licking his mother's eyeball.)	Idle Hands	Nominated
2000	Saturn Awards	Best Performance by a Younger Actor	Idle Hands	Nominated
2001	Saturn Awards	Best Performance by a Younger Actor	Final Destination	Won
2001	Blockbuster Entertainment Awards	Favorite Actor – Horror	Final Destination	Nominated
2021	HNiD Awards	Best Supporting Actor	Hunter Hunter	Runner-up
