= No Lies =

1973 short film

- DVD cover
- Directed by: Mitchell Block
- Written by: Mitchell Block
- Produced by: Mitchell Block
- Starring: Shelby Leverington
- Cinematography: Alec Hirschfeld
- Edited by: Ray Anne School
- Distributed by: Direct Cinema Ltd.
- Release date: May 1973
- Running time: 16 minutes
- Country: United States
- Language: English

No Lies is a 1973 American short drama film made by Mitchell Block while he was a student at New York University.

== Summary ==
The film, which is in the style of a cinéma vérité interview by a young filmmaker, deals with a young woman who has been raped and the trauma that came with it.

== Legacy ==
In 2008, No Lies... was selected for preservation in the United States National Film Registry by the Library of Congress, being deemed "culturally, historically, or aesthetically significant."

In 2016, film critics for the website IndieWire selected No Lies as one of the ten best short films ever made.

== See also ==
- List of American films of 1973
- Found footage
- Mockumentary

== Literature ==
- Block, Mitchell (2006). "The Truth about No Lies (If You Can Believe It)". In Juhasz, Alexandra; Lerner, Jesse (eds.). F is for Phony. Fake Documentary and Truth's Undoing. Minneapolis: University of Minnesota Press. pp. 187–195. ISBN 978-0816642519.
