= Sandro Lombardi =

Swiss footballer (born 1986)

Personal information
- Date of birth: 12 July 1986 (age 40)
- Place of birth: Switzerland
- Height: 1.67 m (5 ft 5 1/2 in)
- Position: Midfielder

Youth career
- Grasshopper

Senior career*
Years	Team	Apps	(Gls)
2004–2009	Winterthur	120	(8)
2009–2011	Pro Patria	24	(1)
2011–2014	Wil	79	(12)
2014–2015	Lugano	17	(1)
2015–2019	Wil	76	(5)
- * Club domestic league appearances and goals

Sandro Lombardi (born 12 July 1986) is a retired Swiss footballer.

== Biography ==
Lombardi started his career at Grasshopper Club Zürich, and played for its reserve team at regional league. In 2009, he joined Italian Lega Pro Seconda Divisione and a year later signed a reported 3-year contract. However he only played twice in 2010–11 Lega Pro Seconda Divisione.

In July 2011 he returned to Switzerland for Wil in 1-year contract.

Lombardi decided to retire at the end of the 2018-19 season.
