= Los Angeles International Culture Film Festival =

American competitive film festival

Los Angeles International Culture Film Festival (LAICFF) is an international film festival. It celebrates cultural diversity through the media of film. With its global competition program and highlight screenings, LAICFF aims not only to support under-discovered filmmakers with exhibition platform and development opportunities, but more importantly, to raise awareness and improve understanding of diverse international cultures in America, and to enhance the influence of these global cultures via the power of cinema.

== History ==
LAICFF was founded in 2015 by International Scholars Film Association, a student-run non-profit film organization based on University of California, Los Angeles, and is intended to run annually every year.

== Awards and prizes ==
Awards are given out in the following categories:

- Jury's Culture Award - given to the submission which best demonstrates or presents a certain regional culture, and therefore has the highest cultural significance.
- Best Picture
- Best Director
- Best Screenplay
- Best Documentary
- Best Cinematography
- Best Production Design
