= Lisa Hammer =

American filmmaker, actress, composer and singer (born 1967)

- Born: Lisa Houle; April 4, 1967 (age 58); Salem, Massachusetts, United States
- Occupations: Filmmaker, actress, composer, singer
- Spouse: Doc Hammer (1989–2008)
- Website: www.lisahammer.com

Lisa Hammer (née Houle; born April 4, 1967, in Salem, Massachusetts, U.S.) is an American filmmaker, actress, composer and singer. She graduated from Emerson College, with a BS in Film. She founded the Blessed Elysium Motion Picture Company, which produces German Expressionist films. Such works include Pus$bucket and Crawley, a collaboration with Ben Edlund and Doc Hammer, her ex-husband. She has also contributed to Joanie4Jackie, a film anthology project run by Miranda July, which featured Hammer's film Empire of Ache starring Dame Darcy.

Hammer collaborated with Dame Darcy on the weekly television show Turn of the Century, a New York City Public-access television cable TV show done in a German Expressionist manner that lasted from 1996 to 1999. The show featured various New York personalities, including Daria Klotz (as Duchess Daria), Jennifer Nixon as Queen Itchie, Bliss Blood, Maude Swift as Secretary Jenny and guests such as Thurston Moore and Courtney Love. It was cited by New York Magazine as "the best public access show of 1997" and has been syndicated on public access stations around the U.S. She collaborated with cult star Alizarinkryz on the weekly NYC cable show POX from 2002-2004. POX was cited by New York Press Magazine as "the best public access show of 2003", and has also been syndicated on public access stations around the U.S. and on the internet.

Hammer directed the feature film version of POX, which stars (alphabetically) Aarti Mann (credited as Aarti Majmudar¹), Lisa D'Amato, Clint Catalyst, Clayne Crawford, James Duval, and Jeff Lieberman, among others. It was released on April 4, 2011.

She was lead singer of the goth band Mors Syphilitica from 1995 through 2002, which released three full-length recordings and one 12 inch EP before breaking up, as well as of the band Requiem in White, which released several recordings and videos.

In 2003, Lisa joined the cast of The Venture Bros. as the voice of Triana Orpheus.

In 2009, she released her first solo album, Dakini on Projekt Records.

In 2012 she teamed up with Steven Deal to form Radiana. Their self-titled debut album came out on Projekt Records the same year.

== Films ==
- The Invisible Life of Thomas Lynch by Lisa Hammer and James Merendino
- POX by Lisa Hammer
- Pus$bucket by Lisa Hammer
- Crawley by Lisa Hammer, Ben Edlund and Doc Hammer
- Period Piece by Lisa Hammer
- Why Does it Do That? by Lisa Hammer
- Ultimate Team Invasion Force by Lisa Hammer
- Grimmer Than Grimm stageplay by Lisa Hammer
- Empire of Ache by Lisa Hammer
- The Dance of Death by Lisa Hammer
- Cards With Cards by Lisa Hammer and Dame Darcy
- Turn of the Century by Lisa Hammer
- Jorinda and Joringel by Lisa Hammer
- Beauty and the Beast by Lisa Hammer
- Rub by Doc Hammer starring Lisa Hammer
- Maldorora and a Little Girl by Maude Swift starring Lisa Hammer

== Discography ==
Requiem in White:

- 12 inch vinyl EP, First Communion
- "Of The Want Infinite", CD, First Communion

Mors Syphilitica:

- 12 inch vinyl EP, Sacrum Torch, 1996
- Mors Syphilitica, CD, Sacrum Torch, 1996
- Primrose, CD, Sacrum Torch, 1998
- Feather and Fate, CD, Projekt, 2001

Solo

- Dakini, CD, Projekt, 2009

Radiana

- Radiana, CD, Projekt, 2012
