= Asteris Koutoulas =

Greek-Romanian event/music producer, publicist, translator, filmmaker and author

- Born: Asterinos Koutoulas; 5 April 1960; Oradea, Romania
- Origin: Greek
- Occupations: Personal manager, filmmaker, event management, author
- Years active: since 1978
- Website: http://www.asteris-koutoulas.de

Asteris Koutoulas (also known as Asteris Kutulas) (Greek: Αστέρης Κούτουλας; born 5 April 1960) is a Greek-Romanian event and music producer, publicist, translator, filmmaker and author. He was the manager of Mikis Theodorakis and the event producer of Gert Hof. Koutoulas rose to prominence as a director when his documentary fiction film "Recycling Medea: Not an Opera Ballet Film" won the Cinema for Peace Most Valuable Documentary Film Award in 2014.

== Biography ==
Asteris Koutoulas was born to Greek immigrants in Oradea, Romania.

In 1968, he and his family moved to East Germany. He graduated from Dresden's Kreuzschule (1975-1979) and went on to study German language and the history of philosophy at Leipzig University (1979–1984). Since 1981, he has translated numerous works of Greek authors into German: poetry, essays and prose by Constantine P. Cavafy, Giorgos Seferis, Nikos Engonopoulos, Yiannis Ritsos and Odysseas Elytis, but also the autobiography and writings on music of composer Mikis Theodorakis. Koutoulas has published his own essays and interviews. He was a friend of and collaborator with the poet Yiannis Ritsos.

Between 1987 and 1989, Asteris Koutoulas produced "Bizarre Städte" (Bizarre Cities), a self-published "unofficial" literary series popular with many East German authors, painters and musicians (Heiner Müller, A. R. Penck etc.) who contributed to the range, followed by the magazine "Sondeur" (1990–91) after the Fall of the Wall.

Since 1980, he has been working with Mikis Theodorakis, producing over 30 music CDs and organising more than 150 concerts (a. o. in Canada, Chile, Russia, Israel, South Africa, Turkey, Australia and most European countries). Asteris Koutoulas has been contributing to the official Theodorakis homepage (by Guy Wagner) since the late 1980s, a. o. with texts, updates and entries. In 1998, he published the Theodorakis catalogue of works in Greece, considered a staple and standard by Theodorakis scholars.

Asteris Koutoulas has been the author and director of several documentary film productions as well as dramaturg of theatre and opera productions. In 2014 Kutulas produced "Recycling Medea", his first feature cinema movie, and "Dance Fight Love Die – With Mikis on the Road“ in 2018.

Since the early 1990s, Asteris Koutoulas has been active in the realm of music and event production. As managing director of his own company, Asti Music, he organised productions by fellow Greek artists (Maria Farantouri, George Dalaras, Demis Roussos, Elli Paspala, Alkistis Protopsalti, Haris Alexiou etc.) worldwide, but also arranged or accompanied concerts by international stars like Mercedes Sosa, Sting, Thomas Anders, Milva, Kelly Family, Zülfü Livaneli etc.

Since 1999, Koutoulas has been acting as manager and producer of the director and light architect Gert Hof. Till Hof's death in 2012 he has produced more than 40 mega events across the world, a. o. the simultaneous millennial events at Berlin's Victory Column and the Athens Acropolis as well as the millennial events "1000 years of Hungary" in Budapest and the millennial celebrations in Beijing for the Chinese government, the European Union's "Welcome Europe Event" on Malta in 2004, Moscow's "City Day" on the Red Square in 2003, Donald Trump's "Lights of Freedom Event" in Atlantic City in the same year, 2005's "Light from the Arab World" celebrations for the sultan of Oman, the opening event for Vilnius' celebrations as the chosen European Capital of Culture 2009 or the closing ceremony of the Israel Music Festival 2010 in Jerusalem.

Since 2010, Koutoulas has been the executive producer (until 2014) and artistic consultant of all "Apassionata" productions (until 2019), the biggest European family entertainment show. He founded Hellas Filmbox Berlin, the first Greek film festival in the German capital in 2016.

He is married to German poet Ina Schildhauer.

== Film ==
- Canto General. The General Song of Pablo Neruda and Mikis Theodorakis – A Film by Joachim Tschirner, Rainer Schulz und Asteris Kutulas, Directed by Joachim Tschirner, Berlin 1983 (Documentary, 40 min)
- Say heaven: even when there isn’t one – Meeting Yannis Ritsos – Directed by Joachim Tschirner, Written by Joachim Tschirner & Asteris Kutulas, Berlin 1984 (Documentary, 60 min)
- Zorba ballett in Budapest – A film by Asteris Kutulas, London 1989 (Short documentary, 12 min)
- Sun & Time – Written and directed by Klaus Salge & Asteris Kutulas, Berlin 1999 (TV Documentary for ARTE, 52 min)
- The short life of Chris Gueffroy – A film by Klaus Salge, Dramaturgy: Asteris Kutulas, Berlin 2010 (TV Documentary, 42 min)
- Mikis Theodorakis. Composer – Written and Directed by Asteris Kutulas & Klaus Salge, Berlin 2010 (TV Documentary for ARTE, 53 min)
- Recycling Medea – A film by Asteris Kutulas, Berlin 2013/14 (75 min)
- Dance Fight Love Die – With Mikis on the Road – A film by Asteris Kutulas, Berlin 2018 (88 min)

== Selected bibliography ==
- Asteris Koutoulas: O Mousikos Theodorakis / Theodorakis the Musician (in Greek). Nea Synora – A. A. Livani, 1998. ISBN 960-236-916-7
- Mikis Theodorakis: The ways of the archangel. Autobiography 1925-1949 (in German), edited and translated by Asteris Kutulas, Insel Verlag, Frankfurt 1995, ISBN 3-458-16689-0
- Asteris Kutulas: Mikis Theodorakis. A Life in pictures (in German), Coffee-table book with DVD & 2 CDs. Schott Music, Mainz 2010, ISBN 978-3-7957-0713-2

== Selected CD Productions (as Producer or Co-Producer) ==
- Zülfü Livaneli & Mikis Theodorakis – Together (Tropical, 1996)
- Mikis Theodorakis – First Symphony & Adagio (Intuition, 1996)
- Maria Farantouri - Poetica (Peregrina, 1997)
- George Theodorakis – Nothing in mind (Peregrina, 1998)
- Mikis Theodorakis – Requiem (Intuition, 1999)
- Rainer Kirchmann & Maria Farantouri – Sun & Time (Lyra, 2000)
- Mikis Theodorakis – Mauthausen Trilogy (Pläne, 2000)
- Mikis Theodorakis – First Songs (Intuition, 2005)
- Mikis Theodorakis – The Metamorphoses of Dionysus/ Opera (Intuition, 2006)
- Mikis Theodorakis – Rhapsodies for Cello and Guitar (Intuition, 2006)
- Maria Farantouri - Way home (Peregrina, 2007)
- Mikis Theodorakis - East of the Aegean (Intuition, 2008)
- Mikis Theodorakis & Francesco Diaz – Timeless (Wormland White, 2010)
- Mikis Theodorakis / Sebastian Schwab (arranger) / Johanna Krumin (soprano) – Echowand (WERGO, 2015)
