= List of The Tick characters =

This article details the characters found in all four versions of The Tick.

== Main characters ==
=== The Tick ===
The Tick is a superhero in a blue bug suit (which may or may not be part of his body). He is the main protagonist of the Tick franchise.

=== Arthur ===
Arthur is the Tick's sidekick. He is formally introduced in The Tick #4, but appears as a mysterious flying figure in the background of earlier issues of that series. Trained as an accountant, Arthur purchased his moth suit at an auction and decided to pursue the life of a superhero (resulting in indefinite "psychiatric leave" from his accounting firm). After rescuing a powerful ninja artifact (the Thorn of Oblivion) and helping the Tick and Oedipus defeat the ninjas, Arthur decides to become the Tick's sidekick. In a running joke, Arthur is often mistaken for a rabbit because of the shape and size of his costume's antennae and because his wings are usually folded up. His doughy physique, shy manner, lack of self-confidence, and hesitation in the face of danger are often played for comic contrast against the attitudes and tendencies of other characters (especially the Tick). Arthur is ethnically Jewish (which is mentioned in an episode of the 1994 cartoon series), and his family wants him to leave the superhero lifestyle and return to accounting. Arthur's apartment serves as his and the Tick's superhero headquarters. The 2016 TV series reveals that Arthur's full name is Arthur Everest, but it is unknown if this is his full name in other media.

In the 1994 cartoon series, Arthur is voiced by Micky Dolenz in Season One and by Rob Paulsen in Seasons Two and Three. In the 2001 TV series, Arthur is portrayed by David Burke. In the 2016 TV series, Arthur is portrayed by Griffin Newman.

=== Main allies of the Tick ===
The Tick has different main allies in each of his media appearances:

- American Maid (voiced by Kay Lenz). A parody of Wonder Woman and Captain America exclusive to the 1994 series, American Maid is the World's Most Patriotic Domestic and has a love/hate relationship with Die Fledermaus, though there are hints at a past romance. She is possibly the only competent superhero in the animated series apart from the Tick and Arthur, with whom she occasionally teams up. American Maid is a skilled acrobat and can throw her tiara and stilettos with extreme accuracy. Her name is a pun on "American made".
- Batmanuel (portrayed by Nestor Carbonell). Exclusive to the 2001 TV series, Batmanuel is a Latino parody of Batman who teams up with the Tick and Arthur. Although he claims to be a superhero, Batmanuel doesn't have any special powers and is shown to be a cowardly, shady, and lecherous superhero. He has a love/hate relationship with Captain Liberty.
- Captain Liberty / Janet (portrayed by Liz Vassey). Exclusive to the 2001 TV series, Captain Liberty is a parody of Wonder Woman who teams up with the Tick and Arthur. She is a serious and somewhat sarcastic superhero who works for the CIA. Despite acting tough to other people, she occasionally has relationship issues and woman problems. She has a love/hate relationship with Batmanuel.
- Die Fledermaus (voiced by Cam Clarke). Exclusive to the 1994 TV series, Die Fledermaus is a Batman parody who has a love/hate relationship with American Maid, though there are hints at a past romance. Die Fledermaus is usually the first superhero to run away from danger except on specific occasions. He is also egotistical and obsessed with beautiful women. Die Fledermaus's equipment consists of a roof swinging grappling line gun, utility belt and exoskeleton, and articulated cape. Die Fledermaus means "the bat" in German (literally, "the flitter-mouse").
- Sewer Urchin (voiced by Jess Harnell). A partial parody of Aquaman, Sewer Urchin is a sea urchin-themed superhero who has a luxurious apartment, largely furnished with salvage from the sewers. He has relatively few guests. Sewer Urchin has super stench slime secreting spikes on his suit that enable him to stick on any surface. He is also equipped with lemon grenades, butter shooters, bars of soap, and other various apparel to aid him in his underground endeavor. In addition, he has an oxygen tank and mask, which allow him to breathe in the thickest of sewer sludge.

== Characters in the comic book ==
=== Superheroes ===
Superheroes in The Tick include:

Character	Notable powers	Notes
Unaffiliated
The Ant		Has something in his mouth
Big Shot	Stores a massive arsenal of weaponry, including submachine guns and grenades, inside a wooden chest he wears on his back	A parody of the Punisher
The Cape		A Golden Age superhero that wears an armored cape and is an ally of the Sultan. In his later life, the Cape's armored cape gave him back problems.
The Caped Wonder (a.k.a., Clark Oppenheimer)	See-through vision, super strength, invulnerability, flight, very-hot vision, and super hearing	A parody of Superman
Captain Academia	No known powers but wields a dangerous-looking straight-edge ruler	Dressed in a cap and gown
Crime Cannibal (a.k.a., Keith Donner)	Slight superhuman strength and can eat humans at high speed but has given up cannibalism	A superhero who later poses as a supervillain to infiltrate Lord Byron's gang.
Fish Boy: Lost Prince of Atlantis	Sea-animal telepathy	Can't swim
Four-Legged Man	Has four legs	
Fiery Flame		A pyromaniac hero who was driven mad when his family and dog died. Father of future hero Friendly Fire.
Hand-Grenade Man	None	Carries a grenade
Mighty Agrippa: Roman God of the Aqueduct	Superhuman strength, flight, and water control	Arch-enemy of Thrakkorzog
Mucilage Man	Shoots high-density adhesives from his self-made suit	Early version of Captain Mucilage, who would appear in the animated series
Six Gun	Can juggle and fire guns very well	
Oedipus		A ninja and apprentice of Shing, a ninja master. Full name: Oedipus Ashley Stevens. A parody of Elektra.
Sister Pulchritude	Can shoot energy beams and has incredible kung-fu skills, but only when she undresses	Attempted to join the Unnamed Superhero Team but was prevented by the Bumbling Bee
Paul the Samurai	Martial arts. Fights with a loaf of bread.	Arch-nemesis and brother of Sagin, who deposed him as master of ninjas
The Sultan		He was the hero of the Golden Age. Calls himself the world's best hero. Arch-enemy to King Crime. Inspired Arthur for heroism or at least side-kickery.
Shing		Former leader of the ninjas in America
Ulysses Bang		A Golden Age superhero who was an ally of the Sultan
Visible Man		A Golden Age superhero who was an ally of the Sultan
Civic-Minded Five
Radio King	Can make solid objects out of sound	Leader
Oddman		Has wires coming out of his mask. Most were sawed off by the Chainsaw Vigilante.
Mr. Envelope	Has an envelope-firing gun that can trap enemies	
Feral Boy		Acts like an animal. The only member that appears in other media.
Fernslinger		Created by Radio King. Destroyed by the Chainsaw Vigilante.
Unnamed Superhero Team (includes the Tick and Arthur)
Rubber Ducky	Elasticity	Has a relationship with Bumbling Bee
Bumbling Bee	Shoots bees and honey from a hive strapped to her wrist	Surprisingly ruthless when playing Risk
Caped Cod		Real name—Walter. A violent, womanizing alcoholic. Has had four wives, all of whom divorced him, and four sidekicks. Prone to doing insensitive things, such as sending Bumbling Bee lingerie or giving Crazy Blue Rocket tongue depressors.
Portuguese Man-of-War	Has a barbed whip that can stun whatever it hits	Self-pitying divorcé. Real name—Warren Sr. Formerly part of a father-son team. His ex-wife, however, was horrified and sued him for custody. He lost the case and blamed his defeat on wearing his costume to court. Wears a jellyfish hat.
Running Guy	Has the speed of ten really fast men	
Crazy Blue Rocket (formerly Blue Rocket)	Flies (erratically)	Formerly a great superhero, he went insane after his sidekick’s death. However, because of his detached mental state, he believes that he is in his glory days and that his sidekick is still alive. He flies into a fit of psychosis when this illusion is challenged. Often talks to himself and the jar of Johnny Wingless, which he uses to explain his plans. Because of his mental state, his plans, such as sticking honey-covered tongue depressors to himself and pretending to be a tree to stop Dire Wreath’s rampage, are not very plausible. He has a very worn appearance: his costume is torn, and one lens on his goggles is broken. He is also constantly salivating. He is one of the few heroes whom even the Tick recognizes as insane.
Johnny Wingless		The former sidekick of Crazy Blue Rocket and now a detached tongue in a jar—all that remains of Johnny after a rocketing accident

=== Supervillains ===
Supervillains in The Tick include the following:

Character	Notable powers	Notes
Unaffiliated
Barry Hubris (a.k.a., the Tick)	Invented a vast supply of Tick-related gear, such as a Tick grappling gun and a Tick cycle (with sidecar), with his inherited fortune. Has no known noted powers. His gear consists of an indestructible impact shield, which can absorb an infinite amount of pressure or energy and redistribute it back at an attacker in finite quantities.	Was defeated by the Tick and stripped of his name and possessions by the Tri-State Superhero Congress. He tries to kill the Tick for his name. It is debatable whether he is a hero or a villain.
Chainsaw Vigilante	A skilled fighter with a chainsaw	Attacks superheroes, who he thinks are self-interested meddlers, but is not a true supervillain. Has never killed anyone with his chainsaw. Has a vendetta against the Tick, whom he could not subdue.
Chairface Chippendale	Master criminal strategist, good connections with underground villains	Has a chair for a head. Tries repeatedly to gain infamy by vandalizing public objects with his image. Has a son named Stoolface. Attempted to carve his name into the moon but was thwarted midway through, leaving the letters CHA on the surface.
The District Manager	Basic martial arts training, master commercial businessman	The leader of Ninjas in America. Sagin’s henchman.
Lord Byron		Leader of a criminal gang. Speaks mainly in dramatic verse.
Man-Eating Cow		Originally appeared in a pit of crocodiles and cows in Chairface Chippendale's castle. She is the only cow to survive. Considerably stronger and tougher than any ordinary cow. Like Crime Cannibal, Man-Eating Cow can consume humans with alarming speed. Has never been seen to eat anyone but violent criminals.
Ninjas		A group of ninjas that works for the District Manager.
The Red Eye	Lethal stare	A mysterious hitchhiker whose stare can kill or drive people insane and make them his servants. Has his own horror comic series. Issue 13 of his comic was published in real life.
Sagin	One of the last great masters of Ninjitsu, highly skilled at hand-to-hand combat. Adapted ninja tradition to be able to use guns.	World overlord of the ninjas
Phalanx of Gloom
Thrakkorzog	Brilliant scientist and mastermind. Access to alien technology. Has a tongue with its own mind.	Being from another dimension whose goal is to take over the world with an army of gelatinous clone-soldiers. Was thrown out for eating Toy de Force.
Cockroach	Super strength, possible nigh-invulnerability	Leader of the Phalanx of Gloom. She is French, her favorite candy is Pez, and her favorite movie may be Old Yeller.
The Red Scare	Superhuman strength and durability. Handles a hammer and sickle attached to his wrist.	Villain-for-hire from Villains, Inc., that up-and-coming superheroes hire to make them look good. Originally known as the Whirling Scottish Devil, he does not look like his cartoon counterpart.
Candyman		Has a gumball machine for a head
Underwaterer		"The other Lost Prince of Atlantis" besides Fish Boy. Quit the Phalanx of Gloom when the Tick almost hit him with an anchor.
Fuzzy Person	See entry below.	
Toy de Force	Controls toy robots	Was eventually eaten by Thrakkorzog over an argument over which was better: gelatin zombies or toy robots.
The Praying Mantis	Cannibalism	Eats men only after having sex with them. Tried to use her powers on the Caped Cod. Is in the Phalanx of Gloom only because she says she is a master of jiu-jitsu. Is jealous of the Cockroach because her outfit shows off her shoulders.
Lumber Jane	Chainsaw wielding	Was once the superhero Frogwoman but was defeated by the Chainsaw Vigilante. After her defeat, she became a villain based on him; however, she is not as feared. She wields an electric chainsaw that has a 100-foot extension cord. She does not like smokers.
Semi-Billionaire	None	"The villainous enabler". He founded the Phalanx Of Gloom. He is extremely wealthy and one of the two members of the Cigar Club. He believes in the nobility of superheroes, as Multi-Millionaire does not.
The Evileers
The Fuzzy Person	Can inflate him- or herself.	Most foes find his or her power humorous rather than frightening
Mr. Tragedy	Smarter than anybody else on the team	Failed actor. Weakest of the Evileers. Was taken out by a tire. Almost never smiles.
Multiple Santa	Can create copies of himself in battle	He is a criminal dressed as Santa Claus.
The Terror	Brilliant mastermind. Basic knowledge of militaristic strategies and extensive chemistry and scientific experience.	Decrepit leader of the Evileers. He wrote a workout book for old villains called "Terrorizing". Supposedly eaten by the Man-Eating Cow in "Big Yule Log 2001"; however, he is seen again in the Yule Log Trilogy.
Tuun-La: Not of This World	Flight. Armored muumuu and strong pincers.	

== Characters in the animated series ==
=== Superheroes ===
Character	Notable powers	Notes	Voice Actor
Unaffiliated
Big Shot	Uses powerful guns and other weaponry	Because his mother never loved him, he took a violent path: becoming a hero who uses heavy artillery. By his second appearance, he underwent anger management therapy and began living by the mantra "Keep anger in the Happy Box". A parody of The Punisher	Kevin Schon
Bi-Polar Bear		A superhero dressed as a polar bear. Has bipolar disorder.	Ed Gilbert
Blowfish Avenger	Can puff up to expose his spikes	He is practically immobile when expanded. When he auditioned at the National Super Institute in Reno, Nevada, he was assigned to New Rochelle, New York.	N/A (He is a silent character. However, he had dialogue in other media, such as the book Mighty Blue Justice!)
The Caped Wonder (a.k.a. Clark Oppenheimer)		Tries to change into his superhero suit, but always fails whenever someone uses the bathroom or phonebooths. A parody of Superman.	N/A
Crusading Chameleon	Changes his coloring to match his surroundings. Sticks to walls.	He cannot replicate plaid, brick, polka dots, or any other complicated pattern; attempting to do so causes him to pass out. He is erroneously referred to as the Caped Chameleon in the first episode.	Rob Paulsen
Captain Lemming		Jumps off rooftops. Battle cry: "Come on, spine; work with me!"	Micky Dolenz
Carmelita Vatos	Flight (with moth suit)	Both her and Arthur's moth suits were made by her father, J. J. Eureka Vatos.	Jennifer Hale
Corduroy Cordoba		A man of mystery and a night watchman at the Aztec ruins	Philip Proctor
Doorman	Flight. Can sort superheroes and sidekicks that appear at the Comet Club.	His doorman senses do not seem to apply to supervillains.	Maurice LaMarche
Earth Quaker	Earth powers. Dresses like a Quaker.	Was a judge in the city assignments	N/A (silent character)
Éclair	Flies and fires lightning energy from her eyes	Superheroine of Belgium, named after the French word for lightning, not the pastry	Lisa Raggio
Fiery Flame	Fire powers	Was a judge in the city assignments. Father of future hero Friendly Fire.	N/A (silent character)
Fish Boy		The young misplaced prince of Atlantis who must keep himself moist.	Cam Clarke
Human Bullet	Can survive being fired from a cannon in his backyard	As a running gag, he will fire himself at the first sign of trouble, but somehow always manages to make the situation worse, or at best have no effect at all. Battle cry: "Fire Me Boy!"	Jess Harnell
Jet Valkyrie	Flight		Susan Silo
Mighty Agrippa: Roman God of the Aqueduct	Can fly, has super strength, and can move huge volumes of water from one place to another.		Jess Harnell
Plunger Man	Can unclog toilets.	Plunger Man is a plumber (real name Buster) who can even venture into the girls' bathroom to thwart the evil of clogged toilets. He later used a wrench to reattach Tick and Arthur's arms after they were blasted off by Milo's invention.	Kevin Schon
Rubber Justice	Extreme flexibility.	Was a judge in the city assignments.	N/A (silent character)
Santa Claus	The joyous incarnation of Christmas.	Makes a rare personal appearance to convince the Tick that Multiple Santa is an imposter.	Ron Feinberg
Speak	None	A capybara. The Tick believes Speak has superpowers and often takes the terrified animal on patrol.	Jess Harnell
Civic-Minded Five
Captain Mucilage	A man armed with mucilage-spraying nozzles		Rob Paulsen
The Carpeted Man	Can generate a static charge on any surface (with suit of shag carpet)	Can overheat in sunny, warm weather. His real name is Gary.	Pat Fraley
Feral Boy	Animal tendency	Despite being feral and incapable of complete speech patterns, he actually drives the team's car.	Kevin Schon
4-Legged Man	Has 4 legs	Leads the Civic-Minded Five	Roger Rose
Jungle Janet	Very athletic and skilled in combat	A jungle woman-themed superhero who is perhaps one of the most competent members of the team.	Susan Silo
The Decency Squad
Captain Decency		Leader of the now-retired Decency Squad	Jim Cummings
Johnny Polite	Politeness	It is this politeness that gets him smothered in chocolate by the Terror in the episode "Grandpa Wore Tights".	Cam Clarke
The Living Doll	Opens up to reveal several smaller versions of himself, just like a Russian nesting doll.	Battle cry: "I'm full of tinier men!"	Kevin Schon
Suffra-jet	A rocket strapped to her back	Battle cry: "I vote for goodness!" (a play on "suffragette").	Susan Blu
The Visual Eye	Shoots eyes as reconnaissance projectiles	Battle cry: "Rockets from the sockets!"	Pat Fraley
Potential superheroes-in-training
Baby Boomerangutan	He throws baby dolls that come back as boomerangs.	Former colleague of Arthur who dresses as an orangutan. Battle cry: "It's OK to play with dolls."	Kevin Schon
Gesundheitan	He has super allergies.	Battly cry: "It's sneezing time!"	Paul Eiding
Mr. Exciting	He is possessed by incredible energy	Battle cry: "It's great to be alive."	Danny Mann
Sarcastro	Biting sarcasm	Strongly resembles Cuban dictator Fidel Castro, hence the gag.	Charlie Adler
The Flying Squirrel	Animal empathy	Just really likes squirrels and has the power to call them to her aid. Her catchphrase is "I like squirrels."	Laraine Newman

==== Sidekicks ====
Character	Notable powers	Notes	Voice Actor
Blitzen		Éclair's sidekick, superheroine of Belgium, named after the German word for lightning, not the reindeer. Drives a cool motorcycle.	Candi Milo
Fire Me Boy		Human Bullet's son who fires the cannon that Human Bullet is shot out of.	N/A (silent character)

=== Supervillains ===
Character	Notable powers	Notes	Voice Actor
The Angry Red Herring	Also referred to as simply the Red Herring, he can rub petroleum jelly on himself to escape the grasps of superheroes. He also has machine guns in place of eyes in his fish costume.	Real identity is Milton Roe, who is a fishmonger and jewel thief	Kevin Schon
Baron Violent	Has a belt he uses to adjust his muscular mass, and in turn, his strength, often to overblown proportion	Without the belt enhancement, he is not over five feet tall.	Brian Peck
Barry Hubris (a.k.a. "the Tick")	Has a shield with a conductor in it that allows Barry to crush things he wouldn't be able to normally.	He uses the name "the Tick", unaware that a hero exists with the same name. He claims to be a hero himself, but is only in it for the fame.	Jim Cummings
Betty: Queen of the Ants	Speech and Sentience	Basically a normal ant that can talk	Cathy Moriarty
Brainchild (a.k.a. Charles)	Super intelligence, Inventor	Gave himself a glass skull to show off his large brain. He acts as a villain on principle alone, and has no real motivation other than causing chaos in ways such as attempting to gravitate the Moon into colliding with Earth. In some way, he is a spoof of Leader.	Rob Paulsen (1st Time), Stuart Stone (2nd Time)
The Breadmaster	Creates baked goods that are used as weapons	Expelled from baking college for "pursuing perverse baking experiments".	Roddy McDowell (1st Time), Jess Harnell (2nd Time onward)
Chairface Chippendale		A crime lord and evil mastermind who has a chair for a head. He is also an expert at fencing.	Tony Jay
The Deadly Bulb	Has a light socket on the top of his head in which a giant light bulb usually sits. As transport, he uses a hot air balloon in the shape of a skull.	Inexplicably has a living pig (with a mind of its own) on the end of his right leg—which serves as the basis for his later name, Pigleg	Maurice LaMarche
The Deadly Nose	Has the double-barrel muzzle of a gun for a nose		N/A (silent character)
Dinosaur Neil	Can turn into a giant dinosaur	Although not technically evil, Dinosaur Neil was originally a paleontologist who accidentally ate dinosaur DNA and must take a special medicine to keep himself from transforming and going on thoughtless rampages. He later marries Arthur's sister, Dot.	Danny Mann
Dr. Julius Pendecker	Crazy inventor	A mumbling mad scientist and rival of Mr. Mental	Mark Hamill
Dyna-mole		A man resembling a mole who is continually ensconced in sticks of dynamite. His voice is an impersonation of Peter Lorre	Pat Fraley
Eastern-Bloc Robot Cowboy		A cyberneticist (presumably from Communist eastern Europe, despite the western theme) who transferred his brain to a walking, talking vending machine. Has an unfortunate weakness to quarters.	Pat Fraley
El Seed	Knows how to make chemicals that manipulate plants	An anthropomorphic sunflower wearing a green matador uniform. His name is a play on the historic Spanish hero El Cid.	Ed Gilbert
The Evil Midnight Bomber What Bombs at Midnight	Explosives expert	A crazed bomber who tries to blow up establishments of all sorts, preferably places where superheroes are known to gather, such as the Comet Club. Rarely goes a second without mumbling to himself recollections of snippets of conversation with an unknown second party (given his obvious psychosis, this other person may just be a second personality), some glorifying himself ("And then I says, "Tell me I'm wrong!" And he says, "I can't, baby, 'cause you're not!"), others suggesting a bad end between the two ("And so he says, "I don't like the cut of your jib!" And I go, I says, "It's the only jib I got, baby!").	Maurice LaMarche
Eyebrows Mulligan		A gangster with long eyebrows	Townsend Coleman
The Fin (formally known as Mr. Smartypants)	He has super-intelligence	A talking dolphin who formerly performed in Reno, Nevada, who turns to evil after being annoyed constantly by his trainers Soren and Frederica	Maurice LaMarche
The Guy With Ears Like Little Raisins		A gangster who has ears like little raisins	N/A (silent character)
Harriet Curse	A villain with dark powers.	She resembles Oedipus' mother from the comics.	N/A (silent character)
Headless Henderson		A villain with no head	N/A (silent character)
The Heys		A nihilistic alien race that can only say "Hey" who worship nothing and want to destroy the universe. For a peculiar reason, they all wear suits exactly like Arthur's moth suit.	Hank Saroyan and Steve Susskind
The Hotel Manager		A man from the distant future who opens up a restaurant in the distant past.	Maurice LaMarche
The Human Ton and Handy	The Human Ton has super-strength. Handy can speak while the Human Ton's mouth is otherwise preoccupied, such as when biting the head of the Tick	An enormous dim-witted man, who is the parody of the Blob from the X-Men comics and his verbose, much more intelligent hand puppet who longs to be "a real boy". Handy apparently has an affinity for encouraging people to read literature rather than watch television; his catchphrase, fittingly, is therefore "Read a book!" Handy is a parody of Batman villain Scarface.	Maurice LaMarche
The Idea Men		A group of men wearing suits, white gloves, and large metal masks that muffle their voices to the point that their ransom demands cannot be heard. They travel via zeppelin.	Ed Gilbert
The Indigestible Man	Incapable of being digested	A freelance villain hired by Chairface Chippendale, sporting wild white hair. He uses his abilities to navigate large bodies, such as that of the transformed Dinosaur Neil.	Ed Gilbert
Jack Tuber: Man of a Thousand Faces	Has a potato for a head	A parody of Mr. Potato Head.	Kevin Schon
Jim Rage		A (former) special agent with Project S.H.A.V.E. that has been pursuing an elusive mustache—so much so that his S.H.A.V.E. allies ultimately end up ending their affiliation with him. He wears an eyepatch—not because he is missing an eye, but rather because he thinks it makes him look cool. Likely a parody of Nick Fury	Brad Garrett
Joseph Stalin		In actual history, Joseph Stalin was the dictator of Russia. In this show, Joseph Stalin was one of the Terror's cronies whose Atomic Robot Zombie Cronies that he used in his plans to conquer Earth were thwarted by the Decency Squad. Many years later, the Terror mistook Stalingrad as the actual Stalin until Stalingrad corrected him.	N/A (only appears in photographs)
Lava-Man	Beings made entirely of lava, and the enemy of the Mole people.	One in particular was sent to terminate the Mole King.	Townsend Coleman
Lou Salazar: The Sewer Czar		A corrupt civil agent turned evil and enemy of Sewer Urchin.	John Mariano
The Man-Eating Cow	A cow capable of eating humans	Despite her name, she has never actually been seen eating anyone.	Townsend Coleman
Mr. Mental (a.k.a. Mel Mental)	Mind control and telepathy	Despite his plans to use his mind control to take over Earth, Mr. Mental is often thwarted due to either bad luck or having the lack of competent help.	Canned Walla (baby), Jim Cummings (adult)
The Mother of Invention	Super intelligence	An androgynous man dressed as a stereotypical mother who creates a time helmet to steal the credit for every invention ever made by kidnapping Leonardo da Vinci, Benjamin Franklin, Thomas Edison, Johannes Gutenberg, George Washington Carver, and a cavewoman named Wheel, who allegedly invented the wheel. He would then completely eradicate the past and re-invent the inventions in the future	Paul Williams
Multiple Santa	Being shocked by high-voltage currents creates electric clones of him	He was a criminal who was "granted" his power after stealing a charity worker's Santa Claus suit in an attempt to escape from the police and being accidentally chased off the roof of a building and into a large electric billboard by the Tick (who initially believed the criminal was really Santa).	Jim Cummings
Octo-Paginini		From Belgium; has three sets of arms, for a total of eight limbs; can play several violins simultaneously	Xander Berkeley
Octo Raymond		An octopus-themed enemy. He served as the conductor for the Mollusk Band and provided music at the Enemy Awards	N/A (silent character)
Omnipotus: The Devourer of Worlds		A parody of the Marvel character Galactus. He is an enormous being that feeds on celestial bodies. Although Tick doesn't really consider Omnipotus himself evil, he does consider eating planets (especially Earth) an evil act, according to the book "Mighty Blue Justice!". He has oddly small feet for his size. After Tick convinced him not to eat Earth, he did end up taking a large bite out of the Moon, which remained in that state for the rest of the series' run.	Ron Feinberg
The Ottoman Empress	Ability to control furniture	Also known as simply the Ottoman; she is a beautiful red-head woman who falls in love with Die Fledermaus in an attempt to convert him to evil	Mary Kay Bergman
Pineapple Pokopo	Above-average strength	The leader of a small nation known as Pokoponesia that is known for two things: sharks and pineapples. His head resembles a pineapple (parody of former Panamanian dictator Manuel Noriega who himself was sometimes insultingly called "pineapple-face")	Dorian Harewood
Proto-Clown	Superhuman strength	The product of genetic engineering by a clowning engineer named Bud Frontier in his attempt to make a super-clown with the capacity to amuse and entertain more people than a normal clown. He hates being laughed at, however, and if he is laughed at, it usually results in him going on a destructive, violent rampage. Loosely based on the Incredible Hulk.	Kevin Schon
Sheila Eel	A female villain that wears an electric eel as a garment	She once shocked the Guy With Ears Like Little Raisins when he got too close. Her name is a reference to the singer Sheila E.	N/A (silent character)
Stalingrad	Encyclopedic knowledge of Stalin (?)	A graduate student who looks like and bases his villainy on the work of Joseph Stalin. The Terror constantly gets the two confused as he knew the real Stalin. Stalingrad later falls in love with Tuun-La: Not of This Earth and they later leave Earth together.	Jim Cummings
The Sub-Human		A Golden Age villain that fought the Decency Squad. He wears a miniature submarine on his head.	Jess Harnell
The Swiss Industrial Spies		A group of Swiss spies that targeted the notebook of Dr. J.J. Eureka Vatos, inventor of the moth suit Arthur wears, and even tried to steal the pants from Arthur's suit in an attempt to replicate it.	Various voices
The Terror	Inventor, super-strong in his youth(?)	"The greatest villain of the 20th century... and maybe some of the 19th". He once punched out President Teddy Roosevelt. According to Arthur, he is approximately 117 years old.	Rob Paulsen
Terry		The son of the Terror and a retired insurance adjuster who tries a brief stint walking in his father's footsteps.	Peter Bergman
Thrakkorzog		An alien creature from Dimension 14B. He had an apartment across the hall from Arthur and the Tick. His voice is an impersonation of James Mason	Jim Cummings
Tuun-La, Not of this Earth	Can apparently tuck in her legs and shoot flame from where they were (see Gamera).	An alien that is a brief ally of the Terror alongside Stalingrad, Human Ton and Handy, and Man-Eating Cow. Tuun-La: Not of This Earth later falls in love with Stalingrad and they later leave Earth together.	Pat Musick
Uncle Creamy	Being made of ice cream, he can shoot ice cream from his hands, forming it into the shapes he wants, and is very difficult to hurt physically	A result of an industrial accident. Spoof of Clayface and Sandman. May not be a villain at heart as he once quoted "I'm not a villain, I'm vanilla".	Bobcat Goldthwait
Uncle Creamy II	He can fly with his rocket boots and has a missile launcher on his left arm	A former KGB agent. Spoof of the many Clayfaces	Kevin Schon
Venus	Hypnotizes men to become her love slaves and do whatever she wants	Bears some resemblance to the Venus of Willendorf. Venus' wimpy husband Milo is her sidekick	Linda Gary
Wally Head		The leader of the Deertown Aztecs, a baseball team gone bad. He and his baseball team have a lifestyle similar to the Aztecs, constantly adding the phrase "Itlan" to whatever they say.	Phil Austin
Whirling Scottish Devil	He can spin at high speeds	While the Tick was stranded in space and believed to be dead, Arthur attempted to apprehend this criminal solo. Upon the Tick's return from space aboard Omnipotus' rocket-powered shoe, he knocks the head off of a Tick statue sculpted in his honor by The City, which falls onto the Devil and knocks him out.	Pat Fraley
The Yes Men	N/A	N/A	N/A

==== Henchmen ====
Character	Notable powers	Notes	Voice Actor
Arthur Clone		A clone of Arthur created by Thrakkorzog. It is only capable of saying the phrase "I Arthur".	Micky Dolenz
Bee Twins		Bee-themed female villains that are El Seed's henchmen.	Pat Musick
Boils Brown		One of Chairface Chippendale's henchmen, whose face is covered in boils.	N/A (silent character)
Buttery Pat	Can slip through tight spaces due to being made of butter.	The Breadmaster's sidekick	Jess Harnell
The Crease		Has a large facial crease that covers his eyes	Kevin Schon (1st time), Pat Fraley (2nd Time)
Dean	Super-strength	Chairface Chippendale's henchman who has a butterfly nut for a head. Referred to as the Butterfly-Nutcase in comics and other media.	N/A (silent character)
Filth		Lou Salazar's henchmen	David Lander and Chuck McCann
The Forehead		One of Chairface Chippendale's henchmen who has a large forehead.	Rob Paulsen
Fortissimo Brothers	They have the strength of 10 men where Tick was uncertain whether that means 5 men apiece or twenty altogether	Octo Paganini's henchmen.	Philip Proctor
Gingerbread Men		A bunch of Gingerbread Men created by Breadmaster. They can be rendered immobile upon becoming stale.	N/A (silent characters)
Hooks Horowitz		A henchman of Chairface Chippendale who has hooks for hands. His face is never seen, and in the comics, he does not even have a head at all.	N/A (silent character)
Mad Nanny	Wears robotic armor	Real name Miriam Brunch, the Mad Nanny is Brainchild's babysitter whom he brainwashed and outfitted in robotic armor.	Pat Musick
Milo		Venus' husband and sidekick, whose inventing mind created a ray that made the Tick and Arthur's arms fall off and placed them on the crudely made Evil Tick and Arthur robots which were used to frame them. Wears a poorly made angel costume.	Gerrit Graham
Minda		Mr. Mental's assistant and sidekick. However, she later became a receptionist at Captain Sanity's Superhero Sanitarium after she grew tired of his plans for world conquest.	Jennifer Darling
Professor Chromedome	Inventor	Chairface Chippendale's mad scientist henchman who wears a tight metal helmet covering his scalp.	Hamilton Camp
Rosebud	Super-strength	Rosebud is a large rose monster created by El Seed to help steal the 400 Year Bloom.	Townsend Coleman
Skippy		Originally Brainchild's dog, his brain was placed in a robotic dog body after he was hit by a car while chasing one coming toward him.	Roger Rose
Socket and Watt		Deadly Bulb's henchmen	Paul Eiding and Jess Harnell
Tick-Bot and Arthur-Bot		Crudely made robot look-a-likes of the Tick and Arthur that were created by Milo and had the stolen arms of Tick and Arthur, whom they were used to frame for various crimes	N/A (silent characters)
Tick Clone		A clone of Tick created by Thrakkorzog.	N/A (silent character)
Zipperneck		One of Chairface Chippendale's henchmen. The zipper on his neck can be unzipped to reveal the interior of his esophagus, which is so grotesque that heroes will cease fighting just to avoid looking at it. He was also once mentioned on the 2001 live action show.	Pat Fraley

=== Civilians ===
In the 1994 TV series, there are different civilians that live in The City:

Character	Notes	Voice Actor
Unaffiliated
Amelia	The Brainchild's little sister and part-time lab assistant.	Debi Derryberry
Mayor Blank	The Mayor of The City.	Pat Fraley
Brian Pinhead	Local news reporter (pronounced 'pin-aide').	Roger Rose
Captain Sanity	A therapist for superheroes. He is a disembodied head being kept alive in a liquid-filled jar.	Cam Clarke
Dot	Arthur's sister. Initially she disapproves of her brother's lifestyle until she witnesses him and the Tick defeat Dinosaur Neil, whom she later marries. Like Arthur, she is Jewish.	Kimmy Robertson
Dr. Bud Frontier	Creator of Proto-Clown.	Roger Rose
Dr. Think	Mad scientist, parody of Dr. Strangelove.	Unknown
Mindy Moleford	A supermodel who is a parody of Cindy Crawford. She is later revealed to be part Mole-Person.	Gail Matthius
The Mole-People	Subterranean humanoids.	Dan Castellaneta
Professor Akiko Ichibana	Caretaker of the 400 Year Bloom.	Huanani Minn
Sally Vacuum	Local news reporter.	Pat Musick
Security Guards	Defeated by Brainchild and Venus in their encounters with the villains, but manage to arrest Multiple Santa.	Unknown
Taft	Physical therapist at Captain Sanity's Superhero Sanitorium, a spoof of John Shaft. The "physical therapy" he used to provide for the Tick would merely consist of him dressing in costumes and beating him up.	Dorian Harewood
The Whats	A race of intelligent, though cowardly and ugly, aliens who can only say "What".	Various Voices

== Characters in the 2001 live-action series ==
=== Superheroes ===
Character	Notable powers	Notes	Actor
Unaffiliated
The Cape		An older superhero.	William Newman
Fiery Blaze	Uses fire-based weapons.		Ron Perlman
Fishboy: Lost Prince of Atlantis		Sidekick of the Angler.	Todd Felix
Friendly Fire		Fiery Blaze's abused sidekick. He is not to be confused with Friendly Fire, a member of the DC Comics superhero team Section 8 that appeared in Hitman.	Patrick Breen
The Immortal	Superhuman strength, super-speed, enhanced stamina, invulnerability, freezing breath, super hearing, multiple extrasensory and vision powers, intelligence, longevity, flight, and regeneration.	Parody of Superman and Arthur's idol. The Immortal died of a heart attack while having sex with Captain Liberty.	Sam McMurray
Johnny Republic		The sidekick of Uncle Samson.	Antwon Tanner
Kid Caboose		The sidekick of the Runaway Train.	Michael Cornacchia
Medusa		She goes to the same dry cleaners as Captain Liberty.	Mari Morrow
Metcalf		Injured in combat, he now requires a machine to poop.	Peter Bergman
Tiny Man		Former member of the League of Superheroes. He was kicked out since he wasn't tiny enough.	Kevin Thompson
League of Superheroes
The Champion	Super-Strength	Leader of the League of Superheroes. A racist, elitist, egotistical, and sexist parody of Superman. His alter-ego is a lawyer named Steve Filbert, who disguises himself behind a business suit and glasses similarly to Clark Kent.	Jonathan Penner
Sonic Boom	N/A	No information available.	Robert Mailhouse
Captain Comet	N/A	No information available	Jack Armstrong

=== Supervillains ===
Character	Notable powers	Notes	Actor
Unaffiliated
Apocalypse Cow		A 40 ft. cow that can shoot fire from its udder.	Apocalypse Cow is an unseen character.
Destroyo		His real name is Leonid Kasparov Destroyovitch	Kurt Fuller
Francis Peacock		A psychiatrist that traps superheroes to fulfill his own mental issues.	Dave Foley
The Red Scare Robot		A robot created in the 1970s to destroy Jimmy Carter; released with that same programming in The City as part of an abortive attempt to destroy the U.S. Postal Service. The first villain the Tick and Arthur fought.	Carrick O'Quinn
The Terror		"The greatest villain of the 20th century... and maybe some of the 19th". He once punched out President Teddy Roosevelt. He is now an extremely feeble and somewhat senile old man, though still shown to be very evil.	Armin Shimerman

== Characters in the 2016 live-action series ==
=== Superheroes ===
Character	Notable powers	Notes	Actor
Cat-Man-Dude	N/A	Mads "Murph" Murphy was a dairy farmer and animal sanctuary operator who operated as the cat-themed superhero Cat-Man-Dude. After Cat-Man-Dude was arrested for the mauling outside of the YMCA while claiming that Mangler set him up, his revealing of his identity at the suggestion of the District Attorney and the Terror's minions killing his "puma wife and litter of child-kittens" caused the government to do the 28th Amendment that was nicknamed "Murphy's Law" which prevents the law enforcement from revealing the personal information of all superheroes. His name is a reference to Catman and to Kathmandu, the capital of Nepal.	Jonathan Tindle
Dorothy "Dot" Everest	Ability to see what happens in the future when it is a danger for her or others	Arthur's older sister who is an emergency medical technician, Overkill's sidekick; she is a category, most likely 4	Valorie Curry
Mighty Sea-Man	Aquatic physiology	An aquatic superhero. He was once caught in a fishing trawler's nets. Seems to be a parody of Aquaman.	Brett Azar
Onward / Midnight	Ability to talk, starting fires with his mind	A black dog who was the canine sidekick of Christian Soldier. On the day when the Flag Five were killed by the Terror's goons, Onward wasn't there due to being at the vet because of a heartworm condition. After suffering survivor's guilt, Onward took up the alias of Midnight, became a writer where he claims to believe that there is "no God, only Dog", and wrote the self-help book "Good Intentions".	Townsend Coleman (voice)
Overkill / Straight Shooter	Above average strength, speed, agility, and healing. Later he was given cybernetic enhancements. He wields a sniper rifle, dual knives, handgun, shuriken, and bombs	An antihero vigilante who is seeking to find the Terror. Overkill used to be Uncle Samson's sidekick Straight Shooter until the day when Terror massacred the Flag Five where the syphilis rendered him blind and the Terror's minions crushed his hands. This caused Overkill to gain cybernetic eyes and hands to replace his lost body parts. He is a direct parody of Deathstroke.	Scott Speiser
Superian	Flight, super-strength, heat vision, longevity, freeze breath	The world's first and most famous superhero who is a parody of Superman. He arrived on Earth during the Tunguska event in 1908. It is theorized that his arrival led to the development of superhumans.	Brendan Hines
Tyrannosaurus Rathbone		An AEGIS commander who has a metal implant in his chest to cover his black hole heart.	Marc Kudisch
Flexon	Elasticity	A retired hero and former member of the Flag Five who works as a lawyer.	Steven Ogg
Bronze Star	Unknown	N/A	Adam Henry Garcia
Sage, the Supernumerary	Master of the Mystic Arts	The heir to the Blind Eye of Thirdarra.	Clé Bennett

=== Supervillains ===
Character	Notable powers	Notes	Actor
The Terror		The world's most feared supervillain and nemesis of Superian. Believed dead by the public, though the belief he's still alive is a major conspiracy theory. That is until it is revealed that he is, in fact, alive. The Tick and Arthur defeat him in the season 1 finale.	Jackie Earle Haley
Miss Lint/Janet/Joan of Arc	Electricity manipulation	The Terror's most trusted lieutenant. After the Terror's apparent death, she became a lieutenant in the Pyramid Gang. She reunites with the Terror after it is revealed that he is alive. However, she betrays him in the season one finale to control The City for herself. She later takes on a superhero persona of Joan of Arc in season two, revealed in the season two finale as a scheme to rob AEGIS headquarters.	Yara Martinez
Ramses IV		Leader of the Pyramid Gang, the dominant crime organization in The City. Despite his Egyptian themes in the gang, he comes from Minnesota. Killed by Miss Lint in episode 6.	Michael Cerveris
Donnelly Brothers		A group of bank robbers from New England.	Danny Donelly: Hunter Emery; Denny Donnelly: Brian Faherty; Donny Donnelly: Happy Anderson; Dougie Donnelly: Lucas Nixon
Lobstercules	Super strength and aquatic physiology	A humanoid lobster. While not technically a supervillain, she was forced to be a villain by the Donnelly Brothers because they kidnapped her children.	Niko Nedyalkov (suit performer); Liz Vassey (voice)
The Duke aka Doctor Agent Hobbes	Genius-level intellect	Hates superheroes and how they've "infested" AEGIS. Wants the human race to survive and doesn't think superheroes are the answer to that.	John Hodgman

=== Civilians ===
In the 2016 TV series, there are different civilians that live in The City:

Character	Notes	Actor
Beck	A paramedic who is friends with Dot.	Michelle Buteau
Detective Brown	A police detective partnered with Detective Green.	Meredith Forlenza
Detective Green	A police detective partnered with Detective Brown.	Joe Holt
Detective White	A police detective working in The City.	Brian Dysktra
Dr. Creek	A police psychiatrist.	Joanna P. Adler
Dr. Mischa Karamazov	An Urmanian scientist who developed Arthur's suit	John Pirkis
Derek	An IT specialist who used to work for the Terror and the ex-husband of Ms. Lint	Bryan Greenberg
Goat	The owner of a small shop that pays protection money to the Pyramid Gang.	Kahlil Ashanti
Joan	Arthur and Dot's mother.	Patricia Kalember
Officer Dietz	A police officer working in The City.	Andrew Dolan
Stosh	A man who runs the Olympus All Sports Center. He also operates as a back-alley doctor for criminal gangs.	Tyler Bunch
Tinfoil Kevin	A homeless but not office-less person who lives on the streets that are near Arthur's apartment. He gets his name because he makes his own hats out of tinfoil. He is a category and can make him and others (if they touch him) invisible.	Devin Ratray
Walter	Arthur and Dot's stepfather, with whom Arthur has a strained relationship. Walter is also an expert at martial arts, which he keeps secret from Arthur's family. He is later revealed to be a former AEGIS agent.	François Chau
