= Tick (character) =

Fictional character

The Tick
- The Tick taken from a splash page of The Tick #1 (June 1988). Art by Ben Edlund

Publication information
- Publisher: New England Comics
- First appearance: New England Comics Newsletter #14 (July/August 1986)
- Created by: Ben Edlund

In-story information
- Abilities: Superhuman strength and mass; Nigh-invulnerability; Drama power

The Tick is a superhero created by cartoonist Ben Edlund in 1986 as a newsletter mascot for the New England Comics chain of Boston-area comic book stores. The character is a parody of American comic book superheroes.

The character later spun off into an independent comic book series, three TV adaptations, and a video game. Various merchandise have also been based on the character. IGN's list of the Top 100 Comic Book Heroes of All Time ranked the Tick as No. 57.

== History ==
In 1986, eighteen-year-old cartoonist Ben Edlund created the Tick as a mascot for a newsletter of the Brockton (Massachusetts) store New England Comics, where he was a frequent customer. Edlund expanded this into stories, beginning with the three-page tale "The Tick" in New England Comics Newsletter #14–15 (July–August – September–October 1986), in which the hero escapes from a mental institution. The character became popular and the store financed a black-and-white comic book series, with the first issue released in June, 1988, and subsequently reprinted at least nine times through the next decade, including later editions with additional content. The Tick's sidekick, Arthur, was introduced in The Tick #4 (April 1989).

Spin-offs followed featuring characters such as Paul the Samurai, Man-Eating Cow, and Chainsaw Vigilante. Edlund continued to write and illustrate these projects initially through his years as an undergraduate film student at the Massachusetts College of Art. The Chainsaw Vigilante spin-off, which was never completed, was written and illustrated by Zander Cannon. Other series, such as the second Paul the Samurai series and the Man-Eating Cow series, were written by writer Clay Griffith.

In 1994, the Fox network introduced The Tick as a Saturday-morning cartoon series, which Edlund wrote and co-produced. Lasting three seasons, the animated series provided the Tick's greatest mainstream fame. Townsend Coleman voiced the title character and Micky Dolenz played his sidekick Arthur, in season 1. Rob Paulsen took over the Arthur role during seasons 2 and 3. Due to issues relating to Standards and Practices, Edlund was not allowed to feature the comic series supporting cast characters in the cartoon, as characters such as Chainsaw Vigilante and Paul the Samurai were deemed inappropriate for a children's television show. As such, new supporting cast characters such as Die Fledermaus (a Batman parody), American Maid (a Wonder Woman/Captain America parody), and Sewer Urchin (a parody of Dustin Hoffman's character from Rain Man) were created instead. Edlund did not secure ownership rights to said characters, and they are now owned by the animated studio Saban, who made the series. They are therefore exclusive to the animated series continuity. Reruns on Comedy Central helped make the series a cult hit with adults. The 1997 book The Tick: Mighty Blue Justice! by Greg Hyland (creator of Lethargic Lad) was published as a tie-in with the animated series.

In 2001, Fox introduced a live-action TV series (produced by Columbia TriStar Television), written and executive produced by Edlund. The series starred Patrick Warburton as the Tick and David Burke as Arthur. Due to rights issues, original characters from the Fox cartoon series could not appear in the live action series; forcing Edlund to create similar characters: Nestor Carbonell as Batmanuel (a stand-in for Die Fledermaus) and Liz Vassey as Captain Liberty (a stand-in for American Maid). The series was short-lived, however, and it only lasted nine episodes. A DVD release of the complete series (including several unaired episodes) was released on September 30, 2003.

In June 2005, the Toon Disney network began airing The Tick animated series. The series also occasionally aired on ABC Family as part of the Jetix cartoon block. The following year, Buena Vista Home Entertainment released the first season of The Tick animated series on DVD. The second season was released on August 7, 2007; however, both collections were missing an episode for different reasons.

In July 2016, Amazon announced that a new live-action series, starring Peter Serafinowicz and directed by Wally Pfister, would air on Amazon Video. The pilot was picked up as a series, and the first season's 12 episodes were released in two parts—the first six episodes on August 25, 2017, and the second half on February 23, 2018. A 10-episode second season was released on April 5, 2019.

== Fictional character biography ==
The Tick seems to have no memory of his life before being the Tick, and indeed not much memory of anything; more than likely, this is due to frequent head injuries. Each media adaptation has a different origin of the Tick:

- In the original comic series, the Tick is apparently legally insane, having escaped from a mental institution near The City.
- In the 1994 animated series, he was assigned to protect The City after passing an official superhero initiation test.
- In the 2001 live-action series, the Tick was tricked into moving to (and protecting) The City after irritating the employees of a remote bus station he had sworn to protect. He has no memory of his life before that, although Batmanuel suggests that the Tick may be from space.
- In the 2016 live-action series, the Tick has no memory of where he comes from and his past was not explained or uncovered. It is implied he is a projection or guardian of some kind of his sidekick Arthur.

A square-jawed, muscular, bright blue-costumed figure with antennae sticking up from his head, the Tick is a surrealistic parody of superheroes in the vein of Dave Sim's long-running Roach character in Cerebus the Aardvark. He is well-intended, friendly, childlike, good-natured, high-spirited, bombastic, frequently obtuse, and prone to quipping odd, dim remarks and "inspirational" speeches filled with bizarre metaphors. The Tick is known for his nonsensical battle cry, "Spoooooon!", which he decided upon one day while eating a bowl of Drama Flakes cereal. Warburton described his perception of the Tick character, as Warburton played him:

His past is a mystery. So everything that he looks at or perceives can be brand new, and he can get really, really excited and intrigued by something that's just a commonality for everybody else, that's humorous. He's like a child; everything's new. So you just bring that attitude to him, a childlike attitude of discovering things.

— Patrick Warburton

Originally, the Tick's costume was meant to be brown, but it was decided that blue looked better in print. In The Tick vs. The Tick, wherein the Tick is confronted by Barry, an unstable pseudo-hero who also calls himself "the Tick", Barry wears a brown costume similar to the Tick's. The Tick is named after an arachnid, much like Spider-Man.

In the comic series, the Tick gets a job at the Weekly World Planet newspaper. He works in the same office as Clark Oppenheimer, who is also a superhero called the Caped Wonder. Oppenheimer has all the typical Superman powers, including X-ray vision, super strength, invulnerability, flight, heat-vision, and super hearing. Consequently, he looks down on the Tick as a lower form of superhero with limited powers.

Like many superheroes, the Tick has a sidekick, a rather plump former accountant named Arthur. Arthur wears a white moth suit that allows him to fly; however, he is often mistaken for a bunny due to the long ear-like antennae of his costume and the fact that his wings are often folded up. The Tick is impulsive and Arthur serves as a sort of conscience. He also figures out the schemes of villains and formulates plans to stop them. Arthur's "battle cry" is "Not in the face! Not in the face!".

In all of his incarnations, the Tick is surrounded by a cast of equally absurd heroes and villains, many of them parodies of popular comic book characters and character types. Few of the "superheroes" in the Tick mythos have powers that measure up to those of DC Comics or Marvel Comics characters, but their foes are often equally silly or weak. The Tick lives in a city simply called "The City". In the animated series, the Tick was assigned to the city after his "Cabinet of Terror" exploded, leaving him unharmed, during his city assignment selection trials at the National Super Institute Convention in Reno, Nevada.

== Powers and abilities ==
The Tick possesses superhuman strength and mass, which makes him capable of inflicting great damage on his surroundings if he is not careful. His full strength is never actually quantified, although he is capable of lifting whole cars with a single hand and comfortably bending steel girders. In the pilot of the 2016 series, The Tick claims to have the strength of "ten, perhaps twenty men—a crowded bus stop of men".

The Tick is also "nigh-invulnerable", which means it is almost impossible to injure him in any serious way (although he is vulnerable to feelings of pain and his antennae are sensitive). Because of this he can survive moments of extreme stress, and has demonstrated this ability on numerous occasions. Several powerful supervillains have been able to knock the Tick unconscious in several fights, but he never comes to any lasting harm. He also does not possess a super-powered immune system, as he has been seen sick with the common cold just like a normal person. One of the Tick's few limitations is that harming or removing his antennae will destroy his sense of balance.

Finally, the Tick possesses something referred to as "drama power", or a tendency for the Tick's powers to increase as the situation becomes more dramatic. He can also survive in space without a suit, and under water without oxygen for "at least" a long time.

== Reception ==
The Tick has been well received as a comic book character. Empire magazine ranked him as the 28th-greatest comic book character of all time, stating that the Tick was "a lovable lunk, given to overly dramatic declarations on behalf of justice." IGN ranked him as the 57th-greatest comic book hero of all time, saying, "If you like your heroes on the bizarre side, you won't find anyone more surreal than the Tick." IGN also stated that whatever his mental state, the Tick's adventures were "thoroughly enjoyable on both the printed page and television." Wizard magazine rated him as the 187th-greatest comic book character of all time.

== In other media ==
=== Television ===
- The Tick appears in a self-titled animated series (1994), voiced by Townsend Coleman.
- The Tick appears in a first self-titled live-action series (2001), portrayed by Patrick Warburton.
- The Tick appears in a second self-titled live-action series (2016), portrayed by Peter Serafinowicz.

=== Merchandising ===
While The Tick comic book series included some extras, such as trading cards, the merchandising of The Tick increased dramatically with the launch of the animated series. Action figures, stickers, pogs, T-shirts, hats, party favors, costumes, and a board game were created. In addition, many fast food restaurant chains, such as Carl's Jr. and Taco Bell offered Tick-related giveaways.

In 1994, Fox Interactive also released a video game based primarily on the comics; however, it was not well received.

== Bibliography ==
- Edlund, Ben (July 1996). The Tick: The Naked City. Marlowe & Company. ISBN 978-1-56924-828-7.
- Edlund, Ben (2003). The Tick: Circus Maximus Collection. New England Comics Press.
- Edlund, Ben (October 29, 2008). The Tick: The Complete Edlund. New England Comics Press.
- Hyland, Greg (May 1, 1997). The Tick: Mighty Blue Justice!. Berkley Books. ISBN 978-1-57297-250-6.
- McCulloch, Chris (2009). The Tick: Karma Tornado, The Complete Works. New England Comics Press.
- Stone, Eli (2009). The Tick: Big Blue Tick, The Complete Works. New England Comics.
- Wang, Sean (2009). The Tick and Arthur, The Complete Works. New England Comics Press.
- Wang, Sean; Stone, Eli (2009). The Tick Specials, The Complete Works. New England Comics Press.
