= The Tick (1994 TV series) =

American animated television series

- Genre: Superhero, comedy, satire
- Created by: Ben Edlund
- Based on: The Tick by Ben Edlund
- Voices of: Townsend Coleman; Micky Dolenz (1994–95); Rob Paulsen (1995–96); Cam Clarke; Kay Lenz; Jess Harnell
- Composer: Doug Katsaros
- Country of origin: United States
- No. of seasons: 3
- No. of episodes: 36

Production
- Executive producers: Joe Bacall, Tom Griffin, CJ Kettler
- Producer: Hank Tucker
- Running time: 30 minutes (including commercials)
- Production companies: Sunbow Productions; Graz Entertainment; AKOM; Fox Children's Productions; Madhouse Studios

Original release
- Network: Fox (Fox Kids)
- Release: September 10, 1994 – November 24, 1996

The Tick is an American animated television series adaptation of the New England Comics satirical superhero the Tick. The series aired for three seasons from 1994 to 1996 on the Fox network's Fox Kids block, which introduced the character to a mainstream audience. The Tick has been syndicated by various networks (such as Comedy Central), further increasing the show's cult following, and has been released on both VHS and DVD. A first live-action series aired in 2001, with Amazon launching a second live-action series in 2016. The Tick was also shown on Teletoon in Canada and on Fox Kids/Jetix in the United States, Europe, and Middle East. The show was aired in the United Kingdom on BBC2 at various time slots between 1995 and 1996. Ownership of the series passed to Disney in 2001 when Disney acquired Fox Kids Worldwide.

== Plot ==
The Tick is a big blue superhero who underwent tryouts at the National Super Institute in Reno, Nevada, where superheroes who pass will be assigned to the best cities to protect from crime. Upon passing the tryouts, the Tick is assigned to the City, where he befriends a former accountant named Arthur and takes him as a sidekick. With the aid of Die Fledermaus, American Maid, Sewer Urchin, and other superheroes, the Tick and Arthur protect the City from bad guys like Chairface Chippendale, Breadmaster, El Seed, the Terror, and others who would harm it.

== Cast ==
=== Principal voice actors ===
- Cam Clarke as Die Fledermaus, Fishboy, Johnny Polite
- Townsend Coleman as the Tick, Lava Man, Man-Eating Cow, Eyebrows Mulligan
- Micky Dolenz as Arthur (Season 1), Captain Lemming
- Jess Harnell as Sewer Urchin, Breadmaster, Human Bullet, Mighty Agrippa: Roman God of the Aqueduct, Speak, Sub-Human, Watt
- Kay Lenz as American Maid
- Rob Paulsen as Arthur (Seasons 2–3), Brainchild, Crusading Chameleon, Captain Mucilage, the Forehead, the Terror

=== Notable additional voice cast ===
- Phil Austin as Wally, Two-Eyed Jack
- Mary Kay Bergman as Ants, Ottoman, Secretary
- Hamilton Camp as Professor Chromedome, Benjamin Franklin
- Jim Cummings as Barry Hubris, Captain Decency, Mr. Mental, Multiple Santa, Stalingrad, Thrakkorzog, Leonardo da Vinci, Attila the Hun
- Debi Derryberry as Amelia
- Ron Feinberg as Omnipotus, Mayor
- Miriam Flynn as Charles' Mother
- Pat Fraley as the Carpeted Man, the Crease (2nd Time), Mayor Blank, Dyna-Mole, Eastern-Bloc Robot Cowboy, Stalingrad, the Visual Eye, Whirling Scottish Devil, Zipperneck
- Brad Garrett as Jim Rage, Inquisitor
- Ed Gilbert as Bi-Polar Bear, El Seed, Idea Man, Indigestible Man, Johannes Gutenberg
- Jennifer Hale as Carmelita Vatos
- Dorian Harewood as Pineapple Pokopo, Taft, George Washington Carver
- Tony Jay as Chairface Chippendale
- Maurice LaMarche as Doorman, the Deadly Bulb/Pigleg, the Evil Midnight Bomber What Bombs at Midnight, Fin, Hotel Manager, the Human Ton, Handy
- Danny Mann as Dinosaur Neil, Tongue Tongue, Mr. Exciting, Bellbot, Dr. Mung Mung
- Roddy McDowell as the Breadmaster
- Pat Musick as the Bee Twins, Mad Nanny, Tuun-La
- Phil Proctor as Courderoy Cordoba, Fortissimo Brothers, Charles' Father
- Kimmy Robertson as Dot
- Roger Rose as Four-Legged Man, Skippy, Brian Pinhead
- Kevin Schon as the Red Herring, Baby Boomerangutan, Big Shot, the Crease, Feral Boy, Jack Tuber: Man of a Thousand Faces, the Living Doll, Plunger Man, Proto Clown, Uncle Creamy II

== Crew ==
- Susan Blu – Voice Director
- Art Vitello – Voice Director (Season 1; Episodes 7–13)

== Development and production ==
While still in college, Tick creator Ben Edlund was producing his independent comic book series The Tick based on the character. He was eventually approached by Kiscom, a small, New Jersey–based toy licensing and design company. Kiscom wanted to merchandise the Tick. Major TV networks and studios were reluctant to take on an animated series based on the absurd character. Kiscom stayed in touch with Edlund and finally Sunbow Entertainment, the small, New York–based animation company that created The Transformers, G.I. Joe, and The Mask, paired him up with writer Richard Liebmann-Smith. Neither had any experience in animation or television, but for two months they worked vigorously on the first episode of The Tick. Neither man held high esteem for their final script, and their feelings were validated when FOX turned down the first pitch. They were given one more chance to refine it in five days. Over one weekend, they worked "instinctively" with little sleep and ended up satisfying FOX. Edlund later reflected, "We kind of defined in one weekend exactly where the show went for that first season, which was cool." While some darker characters and sexual innuendo seen in the comic series would be removed for its animated counterpart, Sunbow's Tick series would hold to its satirical roots. Writing duties were also given to Christopher McCulloch who had met Edlund prior to their television work and wrote several issues of the Tick comic book series. They would much later work together on McCulloch's Adult Swim series, The Venture Bros.. Edlund, a co-producer of The Tick, remained very hands-on during production, causing delays. According to Edlund:

There was a period where I was extremely attentive to everything that had to be solved, and these efforts ultimately made the show a year late. I saw the storyboards that were being done and realized that if The Tick were animated off of those, it would fall apart. It would be a shadow of what it is now, which is something that isn't massively successful, but has this real staying power. So now instead of looking like bad '90s animation, it kind of looks like bad '70s superhero animation, which definitely has a unique style about it.

The Tick finally premiered on September 10, 1994, and was a success. Edlund later expressed his view that, because the series did not reach the commercial heights of Teenage Mutant Ninja Turtles, its merchandising success deteriorated by the end of its first season. However, he admitted "That's essentially good as far as I'm concerned; although, I would be much more wealthy at this point. That failure, to me, makes The Tick a much more sincere proposal." Rather than being an asylum escapee, as portrayed in the Tick comic book series, the animated version of the Tick crashes a superhero convention to win the "protectorship" of The City. With its emphasis on superhero parody, The Tick became a Saturday morning staple during the Fox Kids block. Its title character was voiced by Townsend Coleman and his sidekick, Arthur, by Micky Dolenz for Season 1. Rob Paulsen took over the latter role for Seasons 2 and 3. The series also features exclusive allies to the Tick like Die Fledermaus, a shallow, self-absorbed Batman parody; Sewer Urchin, a sea urchin-themed Aquaman parody who resembles Dustin Hoffman's character in Rain Man; and American Maid, a more noble superheroine featuring aspects of Wonder Woman and Captain America. The show's opening theme, written by Doug Katsaros, who also composed the scores for every episode, consists of big band music and campy scat singing. A typical episode plot would have the Tick battling a villain until Arthur devises a solution that saves the day. The Tick then declares an absurd moral regarding the previous conflict before the story comes to a close. Although the series was initially aimed primarily at children, it features an absurdist style that appeals to an older audience as well. After three seasons, The Tick's final episode aired November 24, 1996. The following year, FOX began talks with Sunbow Entertainment about producing a prime time Tick special, but this never came to fruition. Comedy Central syndicated The Tick during this time and subsequently helped make it a cult hit with adults. In May 2000, the pilot episode for a live action series of The Tick was completed. FOX attempted to capitalize on the growing adult fan base by introducing this new incarnation in November 2001, but the series could not match the success of its animated predecessor. In June 2005, Toon Disney began airing The Tick along with other former FOX animated series like X-Men. It would also occasionally air on ABC Family as part of the Jetix cartoon block.

== Episodes ==
=== Series overview ===
Season	Episodes	Originally released	
Season	Episodes	First released	Last released
1	13	September 10, 1994	February 11, 1995
2	13	September 9, 1995	February 17, 1996
3	10	September 14, 1996	November 24, 1996

=== Season 1 (1994–95) ===
No. overall	No. in season	Title	Directed by	Written by	Original release date	Prod. code
1	1	"The Tick vs. The Idea Men"	Sue Peters, John Kafka and Russel Mooney	Ben Edlund and Richard Liebmann-Smith	September 10, 1994	101
The Tick moves to The City and meets Arthur, convincing him to become his partner in the battle against evil. Villain: The Idea Men Loosely Based on The Tick #1.
2	2	"The Tick vs. Chairface Chippendale"	Sue Peters, John Kafka and Russel Mooney	Ben Edlund and Richard Liebmann-Smith	September 17, 1994	102
The Tick attempts to thwart Chairface Chippendale's plan to commit the "Crime of the Century": using a powerful heat ray to write his name on the face of the moon. Villain: Chairface Chippendale Loosely Based on The Tick #7.
3	3	"The Tick vs. Dinosaur Neil"	Sue Peters, John Kafka, and Russel Mooney	Ben Edlund and Richard Liebmann-Smith	September 24, 1994	103
Dinosaur Neil, the chief paleontologist at a dig known as "Dinosaur Grotto", is attempting to grow a fully functional dinosaur from tissues found in fossils. After accidentally ingesting some of the tissue, he is transformed into a dinosaur and goes on a rampage across The City. Villain: Dinosaur Neil
4	4	"The Tick vs. Mr. Mental"	Sue Peters, John Kafka and Russel Mooney	Ben Edlund and Richard Liebmann-Smith	October 1, 1994	104
The evil Mr. Mental takes control of the Tick's mind and forces him to steal the Thinking Cap, a device which will give Mr. Mental godlike power. Villain: Mr. Mental
5	5	"The Tick vs. The Breadmaster"	Sue Peters, John Kafka and Russel Mooney	Ben Edlund, Richard Liebmann-Smith and Martin Pasko	October 8, 1994	105
A villain known as the Breadmaster orders large quantities of baking supplies to build the sinister City-Smothering Lemon Soufflé. Villain: Breadmaster
6	6	"The Tick vs. El Seed"	Sue Peters	Ben Edlund and Richard Liebmann-Smith	October 15, 1994	106
The insane El Seed uses his powers over plants to enact revenge on all animal life. To battle him, the Tick and Arthur join forces with the Civic-Minded Five: Captain Mucilage, the Carpeted Man, Feral Boy, 4-Legged Man and Jungle Janet. Villain: El Seed
7	7	"The Tick vs. The Tick"	Art Vitello	Ben Edlund and Richard Liebmann-Smith	October 22, 1994	107
The Tick battles with Barry Hubris, a wannabe superhero who also calls himself the Tick, over rights to the name. Meanwhile, the Evil Midnight Bomber What Bombs at Midnight plans to blow up the Comet Club. Villains: Barry "The Tick" Hubris and the Evil Midnight Bomber What Bombs at Midnight Loosely based on The Tick #11.
8	8	"The Tick vs. The Uncommon Cold"	Art Vitello	Henry Gilroy	October 29, 1994	108
The Tick has a cold, which affects his ability to overcome the alien invader Thrakkorzog, who plots to take over the Earth with an army of evil Tick clones. Villain: Thrakkorzog
9	9	"The Tick vs. Brainchild"	Art Vitello	Art Vitello and Ben Edlund	November 5, 1994	109
Brainchild (aka Charles) wants to use his Mega-Devastator Multi-Cannon to crash the moon into the earth. Villain: Brainchild
10	10	"The Tick vs. Pineapple Pokopo"	Art Vitello	Ben Edlund and Richard Liebmann-Smith	November 12, 1994	110
The Tick, Arthur, and American Maid are sent to Pokoponesia to rescue Yank, a hyperintelligent astronaut monkey, from the evil dictator Pineapple Pokopo. Villain: Pineapple Pokopo
11	11	"The Tick vs. The Mole-Men"	Art Vitello	Christopher McCulloch	November 19, 1994	111
The Tick and Arthur play host to a group of Mole-Men and their King (not included on US DVD set "The Tick vs. Season One" for legal reasons). Villain: Lava Man
12	12	"The Tick vs. The Proto-Clown"	Art Vitello	Henry Gilroy	February 4, 1995	112
The Tick and Arthur return to The City from a trip to discover the genetically engineered Proto-Clown terrorizing the city. The Tick is knocked into his own mind, for a journey of discovery. Villain: Proto Clown
13	13	"The Tick vs. Arthur's Bank Account"	Art Vitello	Ben Edlund and Richard Liebmann-Smith	February 11, 1995	113
The Terror, one of the greatest and oldest villains resurfaces. The Tick, being himself, maxes out Arthur's credit card to pay for excessive equipment to battle the Terror. Finally having had enough, Arthur kicks The Tick out. Villain: The Terror Note This episode marks the official debut of the Tick's catchphrase "Spoon!"

=== Season 2 (1995–96) ===
No. overall	No. in season	Title	Directed by	Written by	Original release date	Prod. code
14	1	"The Little Wooden Boy and the Belly of Love"	Hank Tucker	Ben Edlund and Richard Liebmann-Smith	September 9, 1995	214
Arthur ditches the Tick on Hobby Night to go on a date with Carmelita, so Tick builds himself a new wooden sidekick. Meanwhile, Swiss Industrial Spies are after Dr. Vatos' notebook.
15	2	"Alone Together"	Hank Tucker	Chris McCulloch	September 16, 1995	215
The Tick is sent to the moon to revert Chairface Chippendale's attempt to write his name on it. He ends up blasting through space on Omnipotus (a parody of Galactus), while The City believes he is dead. (This episode was not included on the US DVD set "The Tick vs. Season 2", but was included on the UK DVD set.) Loosely based on The Tick: Karma Tornado #3-4.
16	3	"Armless but Not Harmless"	Hank Tucker	Ben Edlund and Richard Liebmann-Smith	September 23, 1995	216
Tick and Arthur's arms get removed and attached to crude look-a-likes to work for the evil Venus and Milo.
17	4	"Coach Fussell's Lament"	Hank Tucker	Pippin Parker and Andy Yerkes	September 30, 1995	219
Brainchild uses his baby-sitter, the Mad Nanny, to capture the Tick and turn him into a bird to match his brain.
18	5	"Leonardo da Vinci and His Fightin' Genius Time Commandos!"	Hank Tucker	Michael Rubiner	October 7, 1995	218
A villain called the Mother of Invention travels back in time to kidnap history's greatest inventors and plants a bomb in the Renaissance so the world will revert to the dark ages, allowing him to re-invent everything and claim credit.
19	6	"Bloomsday"	Hank Tucker	Ben Edlund and Richard Liebmann-Smith	October 21, 1995	220
The return of El Seed with his newest monster Rosebud.
20	7	"Evil Sits Down for a Moment"	Hank Tucker	Jed Spingarn	November 4, 1995	221
A villain known as the Ottoman Empress tries to marry and corrupt Die Fledermaus to take over The City together. Tick however is stuck in the Softest chair, preventing him from getting out of it.
21	8	"Heroes"	Hank Tucker	Ben Edlund and Randolph Heard	November 11, 1995	222
A camera crew follows the Tick and Arthur for a day of crime fighting.
22	9	"Ants in Pants!"	Hank Tucker	Ralph Soll	November 18, 1995	223
The Tick checks himself into Captain Sanity's Superhero Sanitorium, letting a large colony of ants capture the other superheroes and lock them into a giant people farm.
23	10	"The Tick Loves Santa!"	Hank Tucker	Ben Edlund and Richard Liebmann-Smith	November 25, 1995	217
A small-time bank robber dressed as Santa is chased into an electric billboard, giving him the power of duplication and transforming him into Multiple Santa.
24	11	"Tick vs. The Big Nothing"	Hank Tucker	Ben Edlund and Richard Liebmann-Smith	February 3, 1996	224
The Whats, an alien race, kidnap the Tick and Arthur to thwart their enemies, the Heys, from destroying the universe.
25	12	"Tick vs. Reno, Nevada"	Hank Tucker	Pippin Parker and Andy Yerkes	February 10, 1996	225
While performing in Reno, former performing dolphin the Fin (aka Mr. Smarty Pants) plans to bury Reno with his Fish Magnet. Arthur and Tick come to the rescue only to find that Tick has a gambling problem.
26	13	"Grandpa Wore Tights"	Hank Tucker	Ben Edlund and Richard Liebmann-Smith	February 17, 1996	226
An aging Terror sends his somewhat villainous son Terry to recover his Desire-O-Vac from the aging Decency Squad.

=== Season 3 (1996) ===
No. overall	No. in season	Title	Directed by	Written by	Original release date	Prod. code
27	1	"That Mustache Feeling"	Hank Tucker	Ben Edlund and Christopher McCulloch	September 14, 1996	327
The Tick wakes up with a mustache, only to find out that it has a mind of its own, and that Jim Rage is after it.
28	2	"Tick vs. Dot and Neil's Wedding"	Hank Tucker	Ben Edlund and Richard Liebmann-Smith	September 21, 1996	329
Dot and Dinosaur Neil are to get married, but Chairface's new henchman, the Indigestible Man, messes with Neil's medication, causing him to mutate into a dinosaur again.
29	3	"Sidekicks Don't Kiss"	Hank Tucker	Richard Liebmann-Smith and Christopher McCulloch	September 28, 1996	330
While on a date with Carmelita, Arthur is kidnapped by the Deertown Aztecs. The Tick teams up with Carmelita to find and rescue Arthur and, in the process, gets a pet capybara named Speak.
30	4	"Tick vs. Arthur"	Hank Tucker	Ben Edlund and Richard Liebmann-Smith	October 5, 1996	332
Arthur confiscates a belt capable of enlarging its wearer's muscles from a new super-villain known as Baron Violent, and, tired of being out of shape, decides to keep it. Along with his muscles, the belt increases the size of his ego, leading him to challenge the Tick.
31	5	"Devil in Diapers"	Hank Tucker	Randolph Heard and Christopher McCulloch	October 6, 1996	328
Mr. Mental, disguised as a baby, hides in the Tick and Arthur's apartment while working on a super-weapon. Note: This episode premiered on Comedy Central.
32	6	"Tick vs. Filth"	Hank Tucker	Ben Edlund and Richard Liebmann-Smith	October 26, 1996	331
The Tick and Arthur gain a newfound respect for the Sewer Urchin, who shines beneath the streets of The City as SewerCzar unleashes an army of intelligent Filth.
33	7	"Tick vs. Europe"	Hank Tucker	Ben Edlund and Richard Liebmann-Smith; Story Concept by: Eric Stangel and Justin Stangel	November 2, 1996	333
The Tick is sent to Antwerp, Belgium on a superhero exchange program with the sidekick Blitzen to battle Octo Paganini and the Eastern Bloc Robot Cowboy while his Belgian counterpart Eclair helps Arthur deal with the Breadmaster.
34	8	"Tick vs. Science"	Hank Tucker	Ben Edlund, Richard Liebmann-Smith and Christopher McCulloch	November 9, 1996	335
Professor Chromedome strikes at a Mad Science Fair, and chaos erupts when he uses a mind-swapping machine to cover his escape. Arthur finally manages to kiss Carmelita, only to find out that the Tick's mind is in Carmelita's body.
35	9	"Tick vs. Prehistory"	Hank Tucker	Randolph Heard	November 16, 1996	334
The Tick and Arthur travel back in time over three million years, join a tribe of Australopithecines and work in a restaurant for time travelers from the distant future.
36	10	"Tick vs. Education"	Hank Tucker	Ben Edlund and Richard Liebmann-Smith; Story Concept by: Eric Stangel and Justin Stangel	November 24, 1996	336
The Tick and Arthur become teacher and teacher's aid at an Extension Class for people who want to become superheroes. While on a field trip, they encounter Uncle Creamy, a disgruntled former employee of an ice cream company on a mission. Note: This episode premiered on Comedy Central.

== Home media ==
=== United States ===
The first two episodes of The Tick, as well as Season 3's "The Tick vs Arthur," were released on VHS in 1995 and 1998 by 20th Century Fox Home Entertainment though the Fox Kids Video label.

On August 29, 2006, Buena Vista Home Entertainment released the first season of The Tick on DVD as The Tick vs. Season One. This collection contains only 12 of the 13 episodes. On May 31, Disney released the following statement regarding the missing episode: "Due to licensing problems, episode No. 11 ("The Tick vs. The Mole Men") is not included. However, we hope to include it in future DVD releases of The Tick". The UK edition of the first season, released the following year, presented all 13 episodes. The second season of The Tick, titled The Tick vs. Season Two, was released on August 7, 2007. This DVD release is not the complete set, however, as it is missing the episode "Alone Together." This episode features Omnipotus, a parody of Galactus (though earlier episodes used similar comic book parodies, and are available on the DVD releases). In the August 6, 2006, entry of his blog, Christopher McCulloch, the writer for all of the omitted episodes, states that he does not know the reason for the exclusion of episode No. 11 from the Season 1 DVD.

=== United Kingdom ===
In the United Kingdom, Liberation Entertainment released all three seasons on DVD. Season 1 on 20 August 2007, Season 2 on 8 October 2007, and Season 3 on 21 January 2008 with a boxset following on 17 March 2008. These sets are uncut and unedited, featuring all episodes of the series.

== Reception ==
=== Critical response ===
During its original run, The Tick was nominated for several Annie Awards as well as Emmys and, in 1995, won two of the former. In March 2008, Wizard magazine ranked The Tick No. 16 on its Top 100 Greatest Cartoons. In January 2009, IGN ranked The Tick No. 6 on its Top 100 Animated Series list. IGN went on to regard it "the first great lampooning of the superhero genre" and compared the series to Mel Brooks and Monty Python. On Rotten Tomatoes, The Tick has an aggregate score of 100% based on eight critic reviews.

=== Awards and nominations ===
==== Annie Awards ====
Year	Category	Nominee	Result
1995	Best Individual Achievement for Creative Supervision in the Field of Animation	Ben Edlund (co-producer)	Won
1995	Best Individual Achievement for Writing in the Field of Animation	Ben Edlund, Richard Liebmann-Smith for "The Tick vs. Arthur's Bank Account"	Won
1995	Best Animated Television Program	The Tick	Nominated
1997	Best Animated TV Program	The Tick	Nominated
1997	Best Individual Achievement: Voice Acting by a Male Performer in a TV Production	Townsend Coleman for playing the Tick	Nominated

==== Daytime Emmy Awards ====
Year	Category	Nominee	Result
1996	Outstanding in Animation	Andres Nieves, Claude Denis, Phillip Kim, David Manners, Richard Liebmann-Smith, Susan Blu, Larry Latham, Elaine Hultgren, Chuck Harvey, Christopher McCulloch, Hank Tucker and Ben Edlund	Nominated
1996	Outstanding Sound Editing - Special Class	Marty Stein, David John West, Rick Hinson, Anthony Torretto, Chris Fradkin and Terry Reiff	Nominated
1997	Outstanding Sound Mixing - Special Class	Stuart Calderon, Deb Adair, John Boyd and David John West	Nominated

== Merchandising ==
While the Tick comic book series included some extras, such as trading cards, merchandising of The Tick increased dramatically with the launch of the animated series. Action figures, pogs, T-shirts, hats, party favors, costumes, and a board game were representative. In addition, many fast food restaurant chains such as Carl's Jr. and Taco Bell offered Tick-related give-aways. Fox Interactive also published a beat 'em up Tick-based video game and released it on the Super NES and Sega Genesis. The game was criticized for having very long stages with large amounts of enemies and a nonsensical ending. In 1997, the year following the series' end, Greg Hyland's The Tick: Mighty Blue Justice! was published as a tie-in with the series.
