= The Tick (2001 TV series) =

- Official series logo.
- Created by: Ben Edlund
- Based on: The Tick by Ben Edlund
- Starring: Patrick Warburton; David Burke; Nestor Carbonell; Liz Vassey
- Composer: Ian Dye
- Country of origin: United States
- Original language: English
- No. of seasons: 1
- No. of episodes: 9

Production
- Executive producers: Ben Edlund; Barry Josephson; Barry Sonnenfeld; Larry Charles; David Sacks
- Camera setup: Single-camera
- Running time: 22 minutes
- Production companies: Sonnenfeld/Josephson Worldwide Entertainment; Columbia TriStar Domestic Television

Original release
- Network: Fox
- Release: November 8, 2001 – January 31, 2002

I am the wild blue yonder. The front line in a never-ending battle between good and not-so-good. Together with my stalwart sidekick Arthur, and the magnanimous help of some other folks I know, we form the yin to villainy's malevolent yang. Destiny has chosen us. Wicked men, you face The Tick!

— opening narration

The Tick is an American sitcom based on the character Tick from the comic book of the same title and starring Patrick Warburton in the title role. It aired on Fox from November 8, 2001, to January 31, 2002, and was produced by Columbia TriStar Television. With a pilot airing on November 8, the series ran nine episodes on broadcast television. It was released on DVD in 2003.

== History ==
The 2001 sitcom was the first attempt at a live action incarnation of The Tick, a comic book created by Ben Edlund, which had previously been adapted for television as a successful animated series, The Tick, which ran 3 seasons from 1994 to 1996. The pilot for the live-action series, completed in May 2000, was written by the four main animated-series writers, Edlund, Randolph Heard, Richard Liebmann-Smith and Chris McCulloch, and directed by Barry Sonnenfeld with production design by Bo Welch.

Executive producer Larry Charles sought to create a character camaraderie similar to that of Seinfeld. He discussed this approach at a July 2000 press conference:

If the show is perceived as merely a superhero show or merely a superhero parody show, I don't think it's going to work on a weekly basis. What's great about the comic book and what was great about the cartoon also has to be great about the live-action show, which is the characters and the interaction of the characters and creating a world that you believe is real. It's a world in which the characters being superheroes is almost a secondary consideration, so that the characters are more important than their costumes.

While working on the pilot episode, Ben Edlund described the series as "closer in tone to the comic book, favoring character over action, painting a superheroic portrait of genuine human lameness." It features a parody style similar to the animated series and the bulky Patrick Warburton in the title role. Guest stars include Ron Perlman, Christopher Lloyd, Kurt Fuller, Armin Shimerman, Mike Hagerty, Penn & Teller, and Dave Foley. The series also featured appearances by then unknowns T.J. Thyne and Missi Pyle.

The Walt Disney Company inherited Fox's previous children's programming lineup and therefore owned the rights to many of the show's names and trademarks. For this reason, American Maid and Die Fledermaus, two major characters in the animated series, were unable to be written into the new show; they were replaced by Captain Liberty and Batmanuel. Disregarding the back stories given in both the comic books and animated series, the sitcom has The Tick being tricked into moving to (and protecting) The City after irritating employees of a remote bus station he had sworn to protect. It is also more adult oriented, including more sexual innuendo and adult situations. As such, the series virtually eliminated action scenes and significantly reduced emphasis on extravagant supervillains, both of which were often featured in the animated series. Regarding the mature tone, Edlund expressed his desire for less vulgarity, particularly in a moment of the pilot where The Tick said "Java Devil, you are now my bitch." However, Edlund lacked the authority to remove such phrasing.

The Tick's costume, designed by Colleen Atwood, bore a notable difference from previous incarnations in that the Tick's face would be entirely exposed. This eliminated the large pupil-less eyes seen in previous incarnations and allowed Warburton to utilize his expressive face; according to Edlund, "There was no way to cover his eyes and get the same range, intensity, and specificity of emotion. With face unfettered, Patrick has created a three-dimensional, hilarious, totally convincing Tick." The antennae of Tick's mask were also remote-controlled by puppeteer Mark Setrakian for comedic effect. The production design is by Emmy-nominated Michael Wylie.

Over a year and a half after its development, The Tick was finally picked up by the network for an 8:30 p.m. prime time slot on Thursday nights. Due to budget constraints, additional episodes were shot with several-month gaps between filming. Fox had initially wanted to premiere the series in early 2001 as a midseason replacement but opted to air it in prime time both due to its ratings success and the network's fear that a strike might delay the fall season. Cast, crew, and journalists expressed early concern over the high-stakes slot, with Fox's Sunday night comedy schedule looking more favorable. Nevertheless, Fox Television Entertainment Group president Sandy Grushow assured that promoting The Tick during the 2001 World Series would work and that "Baseball is a terrific promotional platform for a show like The Tick." Grushow also noted that if the series were to perform well, the network would have until December 2001 to order new episodes, though they would not likely be ready until late spring or summer at the earliest.

While Fox has been criticized for its lack of investment in the series, N2Toys produced a line of action figures based on it. The live action Tick ultimately failed to recapture the success of its animated predecessor; however, its popularity was strong enough that the series would be released on DVD in 2003. The series led to Christopher McCulloch, who wrote for the Tick comic book, animated series, and sitcom, meeting Patrick Warburton during filming; shortly after, he cast Warburton as the voice of Brock Samson for his Adult Swim series, The Venture Bros. Tick creator Ben Edlund also wrote for The Venture Bros. on occasion.

=== Cancellation ===
Concerns regarding the show's time slot, where it aired against popular shows like Survivor: Africa and NBC's Must See TV lineup, were manifested in early 2002 when The Tick was canceled after eight of the nine episodes had aired. According to Patrick Warburton, The Tick performed poorly because Fox did not own the series as they did The Bernie Mac Show and 24, and therefore rarely promoted it. Warburton added that despite fan and critical praise, the high production costs further discouraged FOX from giving The Tick a chance. The costs were increased by overtime pay due to a shortened filming schedule. This comprised a six- or seven-day shooting of each episode shortened to five days. Warburton has repeatedly criticized FOX's mismanagement of the series, reiterating that the network "apparently didn't have a clue."

Edlund later developed a new live-action adaptation of The Tick, which premiered on Amazon Prime Video in 2016. Sonnenfeld and Josephson once again served as executive producers, joined by Warburton as a producer. Warburton was originally due to reprise his role, but the part was recast at Amazon's request with Peter Serafinowicz.

== Cast ==
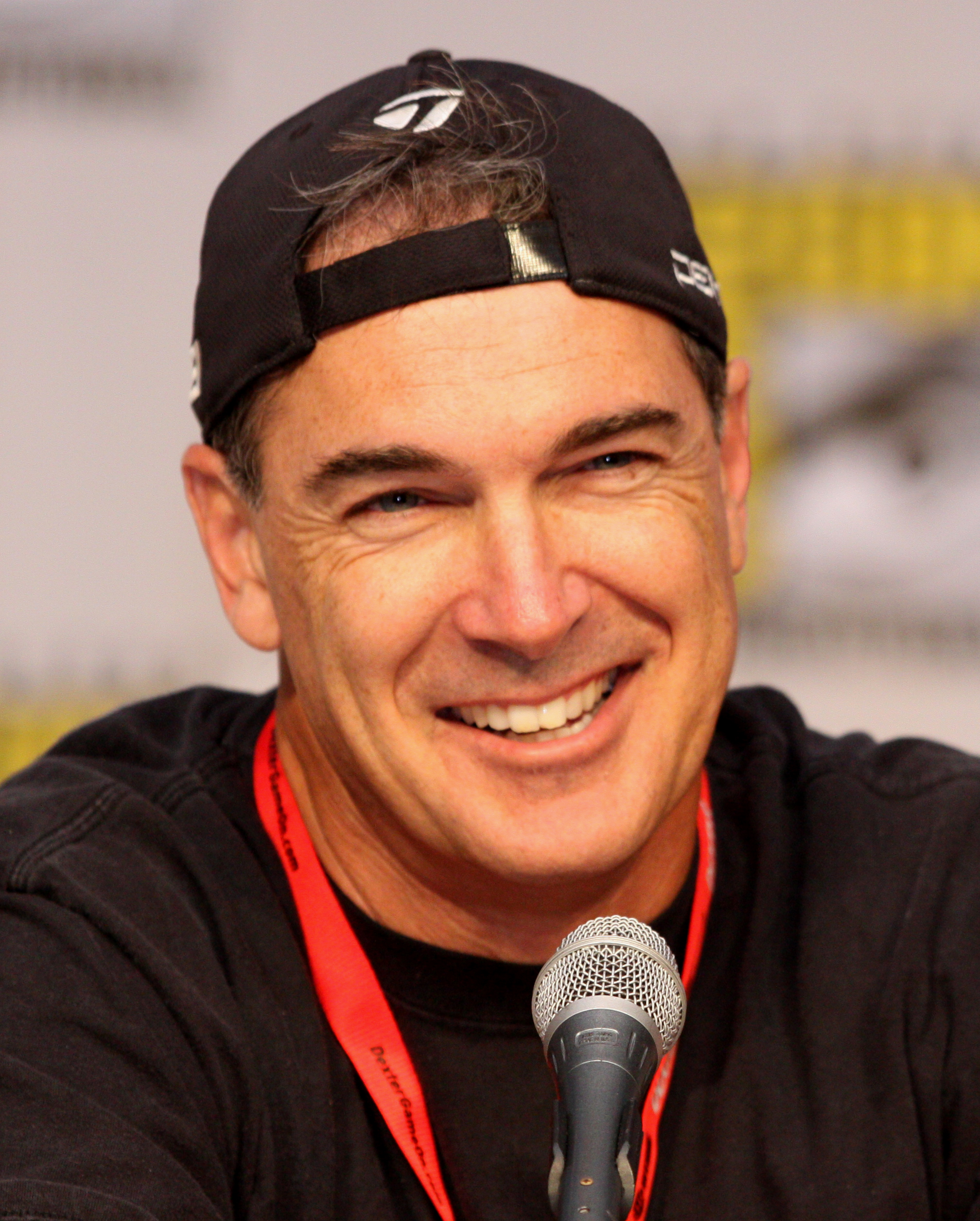
Patrick Warburton plays the Tick

- Patrick Warburton as The Tick
- David Burke as Arthur
- Liz Vassey as Captain Liberty
- Nestor Carbonell as Batmanuel

== Episodes ==
No.	Title	Directed by	Written by	Original release date
1	"Pilot"	Barry Sonnenfeld	Ben Edlund	November 8, 2001
The Tick, a superhero who has been protecting a small bus station, decides it's time to go to The City after he's made to believe he dropped a bus ticket to there. Meanwhile Arthur, an accountant with little self-confidence, tries to fulfill his lifelong urge to become a superhero and loses his job in the process. In their first-ever team up, the Tick and Arthur must thwart the Red Scare, a robot made in the 1970s by the Soviet Union, programmed to destroy then-U.S. president Jimmy Carter. Disregarding the passage of time, the Red Scare attempts to destroy now-former President Carter when it encounters him in The City. Christopher Lloyd plays Arthur's boss Mr. Fishladder in this episode.
2	"The Funeral"	Andrew Tsao	Christopher McCulloch	November 15, 2001
Everyone is thrilled that The Immortal, the famous superhero, is coming to town. He dies while having sex with Captain Liberty, and the group is faced with the challenge of covering up the debacle. Batmanuel impersonates The Immortal while the Tick and Arthur try to put the body back in his hotel room to make it look like he died in his sleep. The Tick must grapple with the realization that everyone dies (rather than just already-dead people, as he believed).
3	"Couples"	Danny Leiner	Ross Venokur	December 5, 2001
The Tick and Arthur have a good time when they start hanging out with Fiery Blaze and his sidekick Friendly Fire. Things turn sour when Arthur finds out that Blaze treats Fire badly and he persuades Fire to take a stand against it. Meanwhile. Blaze convinces Tick that Arthur is the sidekick and should do whatever Tick wants. The Tick's new behavior quickly causes Tick and Arthur to split up. Meanwhile, Batmanuel and Captain Liberty try to cope with their own loneliness, which leads to Captain Liberty getting a dog.
4	"The License"	Craig Zisk	Larry Charles	December 6, 2001
The Tick's superhero activity is put on hold when he is caught operating without a superhero license. He and Arthur quickly find that getting a license is impossible, due to Tick not knowing anything about his past. A woman appears claiming to be Tick's wife, and he immediately accepts this, devastating Arthur. The Tick quickly grows tired of married life while Arthur and Captain Liberty discover that his "wife" is actually an insane criminal who finds missing men and claims to be their wife. Meanwhile, Captain Liberty attempts a relationship with an ordinary man who has no knowledge of her superhero identity, and Batmanuel tries to get into the newspaper.
5	"Arthur Needs Space"	Bo Welch	David Sacks	December 13, 2001
Arthur's love life is cramped by the hovering Tick, who is baffled by the concept of love. A video about the praying mantis gives The Tick a very confused idea about sex.
6	"The Big Leagues"	Bo Welch	Lon Diamond	December 21, 2001
The Tick and Arthur are invited to join the League of Superheroes. Captain Liberty, jealous that she wasn't chosen, hires a top notch lawyer with the help of Batmanuel to sue The League. Unknown to either The Tick, Arthur, Batmanuel, or Captain Liberty, her lawyer is actually the Champion, the racist and misogynistic leader of The League of Superheroes. The Tick and Arthur soon figure out that The League is more of club when they won't spring into action against minor crimes, so they renounce their memberships and leave. The pair then help Captain Liberty by exposing the Champion's true identity in front of the entire law firm which results in the League opening a new group without the Champion.
7	"The Tick vs. Justice"	Mel Damski	Ben Edlund & Larry Charles	January 17, 2002
The Tick, Arthur, and Batmanuel must attend court after a battle with the villain Destroyo, who is arrested after nuclear weapons are found in his car. However, Destroyo claims ignorance and the court soon rules that all of the evidence is inadmissible. The Tick, angry at the turn of events, insults the judge and is sentenced to a night in prison for contempt of court, leaving Batmanuel and Arthur alone for the night as Destroyo plots to kill them before they can take the witness stand the next day. Arthur, having fought off a ninja with the help of Batmanuel, contacts Destroyo's childhood ballet instructor who explains that Destroyo was ridiculed as a boy for being an overweight ballet dancer. The next day, Arthur reminds Destroyo of his most scarring memory which causes the villain to lash out. The Tick then intervenes and defeats Destroyo.
8	"Arthur, Interrupted"	Dean Parisot	Richard Liebmann-Smith	January 24, 2002
At the urging of his friends, Arthur finally "comes out" as a superhero to his family, revealing his life choice to them. They see him as crazy and immediately attempt an intervention. When he tries to leave, Arthur is forcibly taken to a psychiatric hospital. Meanwhile, the Tick grows concerned over Arthur's disappearance and begins to fear the worst. Arthur is treated for his "superhero delusions", but discovers that the head doctor at the institute in fact dresses up in the confiscated costumes for his own amusement.
9	"The Terror"	Boris Damast	Ben Edlund	January 31, 2002
At Arthur and the Tick's one-year anniversary of becoming a team, the group recalls how Captain Liberty, angry at the Tick for stealing her thunder and for his overconfidence, sicced 112-year-old villain The Terror on him and Arthur.

== Broadcast and syndication ==
As of February 2009, the show can be downloaded on iTunes. The series was formerly available to stream for free in the United States on Crackle and Joost. The series was also available for streaming on Netflix in Canada beginning in March 2012.

In January 2011, the show began its first showing on UK TV on the Syfy Channel.

As of 2017, with the remake version being on Amazon Video, this series is also available in the UK and USA for streaming for Prime members.

It is currently made available for streaming online on Tubi and The Roku Channel.

== Home media ==
Columbia TriStar Home Entertainment released the complete series on DVD for the very first time, with the episodes in correct production order, on September 30, 2003. Tick creator Ben Edlund states on one of the DVD commentary tracks that he hoped the sales of the DVD might spur development of either a revived series or a movie, similar to the fates of other cult TV series such as Firefly (for which he was a writer and producer). As of 2013, this release has been discontinued and is out of print.

Mill Creek Entertainment acquired the rights to the series and re-released the complete series on February 4, 2014. The episodes are ordered by air date instead of production.

== Reception ==
On Rotten Tomatoes, The Tick received an aggregate score of 88% based on 21 positive and 3 negative critics’ reviews. The website's consensus reads: "Thanks in part to Patrick Warburton's committed performance, The Tick offers an inventive, highly stylized, and frequently hilarious take on the superhero genre."

Despite its short television life, Kathie Huddleston of SciFi.com named The Tick a Sci Fi "A Pick" and shared both praise and concern over its longevity:

The Tick is extremely well written and produced, with enough special effects to make one a believer in this odd world of superheroes. But can a series that's daring, ingenious, silly and fearless actually make it on network television? We can only hope.

Entertainment Weekly's Dalton Ross gave the series's DVD release an A− rating and commented, "It was too smart. Too funny. Too weird. So, of course, it failed." While not overtly positive, Noel Murray of The A.V. Club commented, "For all The Tick's failings, it was better than most of its broadcast competition two years ago, and it was improving right up until it was yanked off the air."

Upon its DVD release, the series also received praise from DVD Talk, Digitally Obsessed, and Genre Online. Marginally positive reviews came from TV DVD Reviews and DVD Verdict.

In 2002, the series's Victoria J. Auth was nominated for a Costume Designers Guild Award for Excellence in Period/Fantasy for Television Series.

Reflecting on his time on the series, Patrick Warburton commented, "That, to me, was an honor: To get into the blue suit and get to be The Tick. I loved that. I just wish that our beloved Fox network had actually given us a shot instead of killing off the show as they did." In a 2009 interview, Warburton also noted that he still owns one of the Tick suits as a souvenir, and he expressed interest in playing the character in a feature film.

In a 2009 interview, when asked what project he's worked on that did not get its deserved appreciation, Nestor Carbonell named The Tick:

I think it's gotten the love now, on DVD, from people who've discovered it that way, but it obviously didn't last long ... Lost is certainly a show that I love, and it's definitely gotten a lot of love, but I think The Tick is one that really could've been nurtured a little bit more. I always love it when people bring it up. It was really a special show.

Director Barry Sonnenfeld called the Tick pilot "the best thing I've ever directed". He has also expressed interest in making a feature film based on the character. Both Sonnenfeld and Barry Josephson have stated that if DVD sales of The Tick were sufficient, they would push for such a project.
