= The Tick (video game) =

1994 video game

- Sega Genesis cover art
- Developer: Software Creations
- Publisher: Fox Interactive
- Designer: Joe Hawkins
- Artist: Dave McLachlan
- Composers: Paul Tonge; Tony Williams
- Platforms: Super NES, Sega Genesis
- Release: Super NES: NA: November 1994; Sega Genesis: NA: November 1994
- Genres: Action; Beat 'em up
- Mode: Single-player

The Tick is a side-scrolling beat 'em up video game developed by Software Creations and published by Fox Interactive for the Super NES and Sega Genesis systems in 1994. It was based on the comic book and Fox Kids animated series of the same name.

== Gameplay ==
The game is very typical of the side-scrolling genre. However, it becomes a semi-isometric view, like in Streets of Rage, once enemies appear on the screen. The Tick's signature humor is also present in various parts of the game, such as his unorthodox gestures and "Spoon!" battle cry after completing a level (and starting a level in the Genesis version). 44 levels make up the game with "wobble" environments and arcade-style graphics.

== Reception ==
Electronic Gaming Monthly gave the Genesis version a 4.75 out of 10, panning the game for its failure to capture the humor of the titular character, the Tick's limited number of moves, the monotonous repetition of the same enemies, the irritating sound effects, and the general boring tone. They scored the Super NES version a 4.8 out of 10, again citing its "tedious action and plain enemies." GamePro also gave the Super NES version a generally negative review. They felt the game succeeded in replicating the comic book's humor, but the low frame rate and the "endless wave of the same enemies" made the entire experience unenjoyable.

Brett Allan Weiss of Allgame evaluated the Genesis version as "repetitive" and "boring".
