= Ben Edlund =

American cartoonist (born 1968)

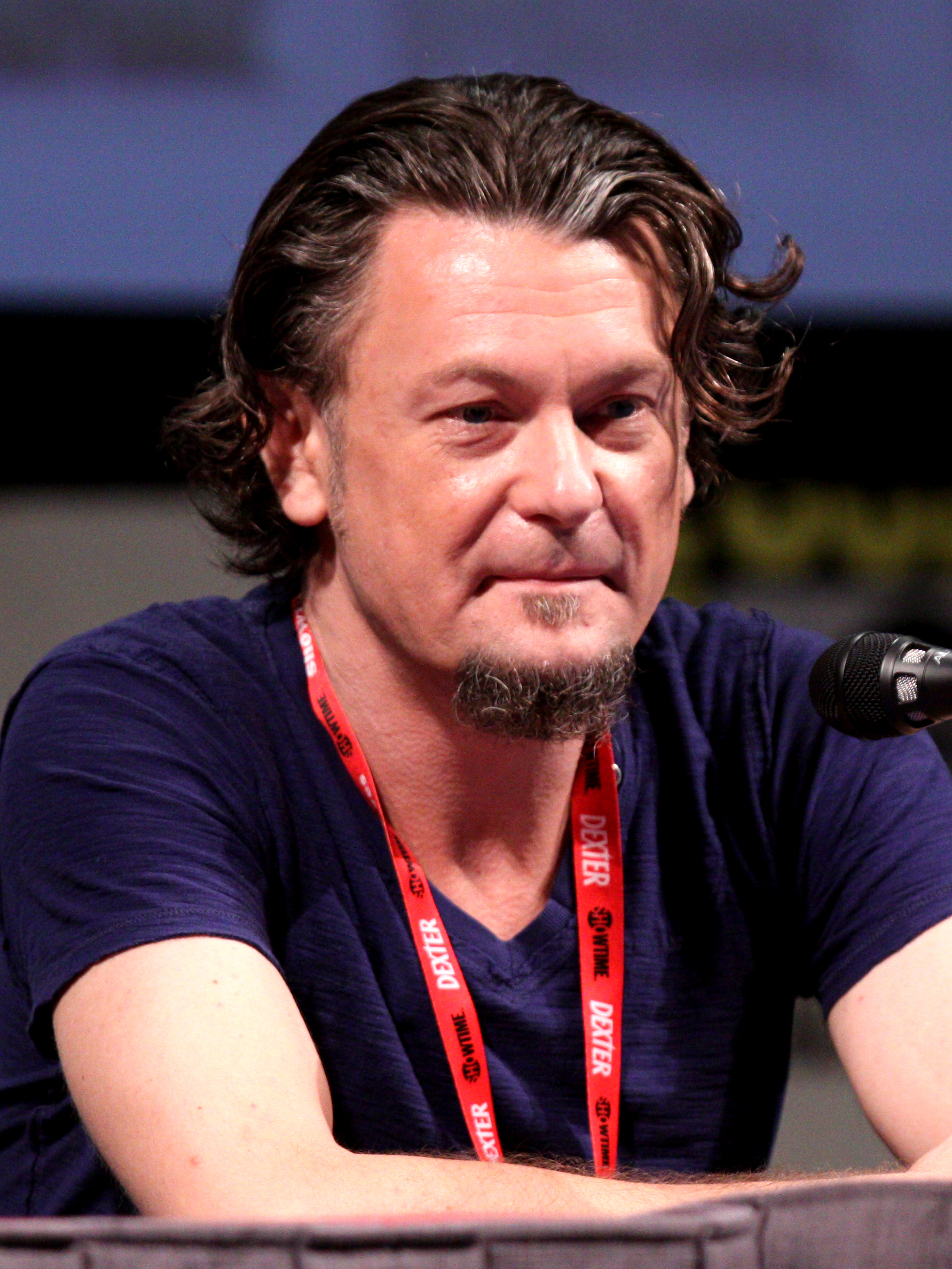
- Edlund at San Diego Comic-Con in July 2011.
- Born: September 20, 1968 (age 58) Pembroke, Massachusetts, U.S.
- Areas: Writer, Artist
- Awards: Inkpot Award (2012)

Ben Edlund (/ˈɛdlənd/; born September 20, 1968) is an American cartoonist, screenwriter, television producer, and television director. He is best known as the creator of the satirical superhero character the Tick.

== Background ==
Edlund was born and raised in Pembroke, Massachusetts. He attended Silver Lake Regional High School and was voted by classmates as "Most Artistic" for both the 8th grade and 12th grade yearbook superlatives. At the age of 17, without a driver's license, Edlund was forced to ride with friends and frequent their favorite hangouts. One particular destination, the New England Comics store, spawned Edlund's interest in the comic book medium, which later launched his art and writing career.

== The Tick ==
While still in high school, he began developing his satirical superhero, the Tick, who became the mascot of the New England Comics newsletter. Edlund was invited to create a comic book series based on the character by New England Comics when, due to a production mix-up, the publisher needed a new title fast. Edlund graduated from high school in 1986 and continued to draw his popular character while majoring in film at Massachusetts College of Art. The debut issue of The Tick took a year and a half for Edlund to develop.

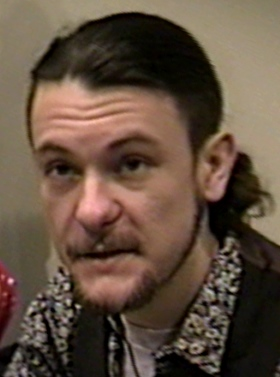
Edlund at a comics convention in the early 1990s

While still in college, Edlund was approached by Kiscom, a New Jersey–based toy licensing and design company, who wanted to develop merchandising off the Tick. Sunbow Entertainment, a New York–based animation company, paired Edlund up with writer Richard Libmann-Smith. After having their premiere episode turned down by Fox, the duo got approval with a refined version.

In 1994, The Tick debuted as an animated series on Fox and lasted three seasons. The program led to various toy and merchandising deals. The limited scope of merchandising compared to other contemporaneous animated series led Edlund to express contentment in his character as a "much more sincere proposal." The Tick appeared on the Fox network in late 2001 with a short-lived live-action series.

== Screenwriting ==
In the late 1990s, Edlund collaborated with indie filmmaker Lisa Hammer and her husband, Eric Hammer, on the film Crawley. The Hammers later worked with him again during the creation of The Venture Bros. which draws inspiration from The Tick.

Beginning in 2002, Edlund was employed by Joss Whedon at Mutant Enemy, first as part of the original writing staff for the space/Western hybrid series Firefly, which was cancelled during its first season, and then on the final season of Angel, where he wrote and also directed the Hugo Award nominated episode, "Smile Time". Edlund credits Whedon with teaching him to create television character arcs. Edlund also had a hand in creating characters for Whedon's successful web series Doctor Horrible's Sing-Along Blog, to which he contributed "Bad Horse" and the henchman sidekick "Moist".

In 2005, Edlund served as co-executive producer on Point Pleasant. He also wrote the Star Wars: The Clone Wars second season episode "Grievous Intrigue".

Beginning in 2006, he served as executive producer, writer, and occasionally director on the TV series Supernatural from season 2 (2006–07) to season 8 (2012–13). On that show, there was a character, a writer/prophet named Chuck Shurley, who went by the pen name "Carver Edlund", a combination of Edlund's last name and that of Jeremy Carver, another Supernatural producer and writer. The writers named another important character after executive producer Robert Singer.

In 2013, Edlund left the Supernatural writing staff to join the second season of Supernatural creator Eric Kripke's new television series, Revolution. It was cancelled after that season. He then joined Gotham as a producer and writer for the first season (2014–15). In 2015, he became a writer for the second season of the Sony PlayStation Network original series Powers.

== Podcast and radio appearances ==
Edlund appeared on Ken Reid's TV Guidance Counselor podcast on May 25, 2016.

== Filmography ==
=== Film ===
Year	Title	Credit	Notes	Ref.
1998	A, B, C... Manhattan	Writer		
2000	Titan A.E.	Screenplay	With John August and Joss Whedon	

=== Television ===
Year	Title	Writer	Creator	Director	Producer	Executive producer	Notes	Ref.
1994–1996	The Tick: The Animated Series	Yes	Yes	No	Co-producer	No	Wrote 24 episodes	
2001–2002	The Tick	Yes	Yes	No	No	Yes	Wrote 3 episodes	
2002	Firefly	Yes	No	No	Yes	No	Wrote 2 episodes	
2003–2004	Angel	Yes	No	Yes	Yes	No	Wrote 5 episodes	
2004–2006	The Venture Bros.	Yes	No	No	No	No	Wrote 3 episodes (1 teleplay, 2 stories)	
2005	The Inside	Yes	No	No	Yes	No	Wrote 1 episode	
2005	Point Pleasant	Yes	No	No	No	Co-executive	Wrote 3 episodes	
2006–2013	Supernatural	Yes	No	Yes	Consulting	Co-executive	Wrote 24 episodes; directed 2 episodes	
2010	Star Wars: The Clone Wars	Yes	No	No	No	No	Wrote 1 episode	
2013–2014	Revolution	Yes	No	No	Consulting	No	Wrote 4 episodes	
2014–2015	Gotham	Yes	No	No	No	Co-executive	Wrote 2 episodes	
2016	Powers	Yes	No	No	No	Co-executive	Wrote 1 episode	
2016–2018	The Tick	Yes	Yes	No	No	Yes	Wrote 6 episodes	
