= The Tick (2016 TV series) =

2016 television series

- Genre: Action/adventure; Comedy; Science fiction; Superhero
- Created by: Ben Edlund
- Based on: The Tick by Ben Edlund
- Starring: Peter Serafinowicz; Griffin Newman; Valorie Curry; Brendan Hines; Yara Martinez; Scott Speiser; Jackie Earle Haley; François Chau
- Composer: Chris Bacon
- Country of origin: United States
- Original language: English
- No. of seasons: 2
- No. of episodes: 22

Production
- Executive producers: Ben Edlund; David Fury; Barry Josephson; Wally Pfister; Barry Sonnenfeld; Susan Hurwitz Arneson
- Producers: Peter Serafinowicz; Patrick Warburton
- Editors: Tucker Marolf; Geofrey Hildrew; Frank McGrath; John Wesley Whitton; Harry B. Miller III; Paul Mendoza
- Camera setup: Single-camera
- Running time: 22–28 minutes
- Production companies: Josephson Entertainment; Amazon Studios; Sony Pictures Television

Original release
- Network: Amazon Prime Video
- Release: August 18, 2016 – April 5, 2019

The Tick is an American television superhero comedy series created for Amazon Prime Video by Ben Edlund, based on his comic book character of the same name. It is the second live-action series based on the character on which Edlund worked, after the cancelled 2001 series that aired on Fox.

Its pilot premiered on August 18, 2016. A "half-season", through to the sixth episode, was released on August 25, 2017, and another six episodes were released on February 23, 2018. On January 17, 2018, Amazon ordered a second season of ten episodes, which premiered on April 5, 2019. A month later, Edlund revealed on Twitter that Amazon Video declined to renew the series for a third season. In June 2019, Edlund said that he was unable to find a "new home" for The Tick, ending the series with two seasons.

== Premise ==
The Tick is a nigh-invulnerable superhero in a blue tick suit who arrives in the City to help battle crime and uncover the mysterious figure behind the City's underworld. He befriends a nervous and mild-mannered young man named Arthur, who becomes his sidekick. They come to realize that an apparently long-dead supervillain called "The Terror" may still be pulling the strings in the city's underworld.

== Cast ==
=== Main ===
- Peter Serafinowicz as The Tick
- Griffin Newman as Arthur Everest
- Valorie Curry as Dot Everest
- Brendan Hines as Superian
- Yara Martinez as Miss Lint / Joan of Arc / Janet
- Scott Speiser as Overkill / Straight Shooter / Esteban
- Jackie Earle Haley as The Terror (Season 1)

=== Recurring ===
- Michael Cerveris as Ramses IV
- Bryan Greenberg as Derek
- Alan Tudyk as the voice of Dangerboat
- Townsend Coleman as the voice of Midnight / Onward
- Kyle Catlett as young Arthur Everest
- Kahlil Ashanti as Goat
- Devin Ratray as Tinfoil Kevin
- Ryan Woodle as Clifford Richter / the Very Large Man ("VLM")
- Joshua Schubart as Frank
- Paul Moon as Khufu
- John Pirkis as Dr. Karamazov
- Richie Moriarty as Thomas Everest, Arthur and Dot's father
- Francois Chau as Walter / John Wu, Arthur and Dot's stepfather and an undercover A.E.G.I.S. agent
- Patricia Kalember as Joan Everest, Arthur and Dot's mother
- Juliet Pritner as Gen. Julie McGinnis
- Dawn McGee as Hannity
- John Hodgman as Dr. Agent Hobbes / The Duke
- Marc Kudisch as Agent Commander Tyrannosaurus Rathbone
- Clé Bennett as Sage, the Supernumerary
- Adam Henry Garcia as Bronze Star
- Julian Cihi as Edgelord
- Steven Ogg as Flexon / Pat Murphy
- Niko Nedyalkov as Lobstercules (suit performer)
- Liz Vassey as the voice of Lobstercules
- Jayne Houdyshell as Black Market Bob
- Clara Wong as Veranda / Miranda, identical twins who work at A.E.G.I.S.

== Episodes ==
| Season | Episodes | | Originally released |
|---|---|---|---|
| 1 | 12 | 1 | August 18, 2016 |
| 1 | 12 | 5 | August 25, 2017 |
| 1 | 12 | 6 | February 23, 2018 |
| 2 | 10 | | April 5, 2019 |

=== Season 1 (2016–2018) ===
| No. overall | No. in season | Title | Directed by | Written by | Original release date |
|---|---|---|---|---|---|
| 1 | 1 | "Pilot" | Wally Pfister | Ben Edlund | August 18, 2016 |
In a world where superheroes and supervillains are real, office temp Arthur is traumatized by the supervillain The Terror, who taunted him as a child after causing his father's death. While authorities and superhero Superian believe The Terror has died, Arthur tracks evidence of a conspiracy theory that he is still alive. He tracks The Terror to crime boss Ramses IV and the Pyramid Gang, and witnesses Miss Lint, a villain with electrical powers and the former right-hand of the Terror, as well as Ramses's henchmen, obtain a package. While spying on them, Arthur is discovered by the Tick, who takes an interest in his sense for justice, but events lead to Arthur being arrested. His sister Dot comes to free him, asking him to take his medication and stop tracking this conspiracy theory. The next morning, Arthur finds the Tick in his bed, having stolen the package (destroying the facility in the process), which is revealed to be a superhero-like suit which the Tick wants Arthur to wear. Arthur orders the Tick to leave, and then tries on the suit for himself, just as he is attacked by Miss Lint and the henchmen.
| 2 | 2 | "Where's My Mind" | Wally Pfister | Ben Edlund | August 25, 2017 |
The Tick arrives, throws Arthur out his window to save him, and easily defeats Miss Lint's gang, in the process causing Miss Lint to lose her grounding. Arthur, who survived being shot at and thrown from the building due to the suit, flees and tries to hide but is later found by the Tick. Arthur starts to wonder if the Tick is just a figment of his imagination, but Dot then shows up, as Arthur had not returned her calls, and assures Arthur she can see the Tick, whom she had heard about when stitching up some of Ramses's men caught in the explosion caused by the Tick. She warns Arthur to stay away from the Tick, and that he has work the next day. Miss Lint reports her failure to regain the suit to Ramses, who threatens her to recover the suit or be killed. That night, Arthur, still wearing the suit, finds himself trailed by some of Ramses's henchmen, just as Overkill arrives and brutally murders them all.
| 3 | 3 | "Secret / Identity" | Romeo Tirone | David Fury | August 25, 2017 |
Overkill threatens Arthur, as he also wants the suit, but the cops arrive, and he runs off, leaving Arthur alone. Arthur feigns being a superhero to clear himself of the crime and returns to his apartment just as Miss Lint arrives. She knocks him out and takes the suit, but also sees one of Arthur's newspaper clippings related to The Terror and takes it too. Arthur wakes up and is nearly late for work, unaware that Overkill is tracking him. When the Tick tries to tell him to skip his job, Arthur learns the Tick only has memories since when they met. He convinces the Tick to seek out the identity of Overkill as he works. While at his job, Arthur is attacked by Overkill but the Tick comes to his rescue. The two fight and Overkill manages to throw the Tick out the window.
| 4 | 4 | "Party Crashers" | Sheree Folkson | Joe Piarulli and Luan Thomas | August 25, 2017 |
The Tick crashes to the ground but is unharmed. Overkill learns Arthur no longer has the super suit, but takes his file on The Terror, impressed with the quality of Arthur's research. Dot reminds Arthur that today is his step-father's birthday party, and he reluctantly attends. The Tick crashes the party. Miss Lint learns that the suit imprinted on Arthur, making him the only one who can use it. She arrives at the party and forces Arthur to put on the suit. He does so, and the two scuffle, which ends with Arthur flying out the window.
| 5 | 5 | "Fear of Flying" | Lev L. Spiro | Susan Hurwitz Arneson | August 25, 2017 |
The automatic controls of the suit causes Arthur to start flying uncontrollably across the city. Arthur manages to call Dot and has her and the Tick help him as he finds a way to gain control of the suit and lands. Just as the Tick and Dot arrive, Overkill also appears, demanding Arthur turn over the suit, but the Tick steps in to defend him. Ramses and the Pyramid gang, who had been tracking the suit, appear, and a firefight breaks out, but the Tick and Overkill easily defeat the men. Overkill takes an unconscious Ramses into his possession. Arthur, Dot, the Tick, and Overkill agree to work together to discover the secret behind the suit, and learn that it was created to fight an alien – specifically, Superian, the first superhero. When they learn Ramses wants it, they deduce that Arthur was correct that Ramses is working for a very-much alive The Terror, who appears in Miss Lint's apartment.
| 6 | 6 | "Rising" | Romeo Tirone | Jose Molina | August 25, 2017 |
While Overkill wants to kill Ramses after they succeed in locating the Terror's lair, Arthur insists they drop him off at AEGIS, the agency that oversees superheroes and supervillains, but find that the office had been shut down years prior. He and the Tick are attacked by the Pyramid Gang in an attempt to rescue Ramses. While Arthur and the Tick are uninjured, the attack sends a bus over the edge of a bridge. The Tick and Arthur successfully rescue all the passengers in front of numerous eyewitnesses, making them heroes to the city. Meanwhile, The Terror explains to Lint how he needed to fake his death to encourage Miss Lint to take action herself. Inspired by his words, she goes and kills Ramses. That evening, as the Tick and Arthur celebrate their new celebrity, Arthur is kidnapped by an unseen assailant. While the Tick discovers Arthur missing, Arthur awakens in a dark room, where he is approached by the Terror.
| 7 | 7 | "Tale from the Crypt" | Thor Freudenthal | David Fury | February 23, 2018 |
The Tick searches for Arthur, as does Dot. Dot arrives at Arthur's apartment, where she finds Overkill. The Tick arrives, and the three launch a plan to rescue Arthur from the Terror's lair. In the Terror's lair, Arthur finds that his cell is adjacent to the cell of Dr. Karamazov, the man who designed Arthur's suit. Ms. Lint provides Arthur with his suit and a means to escape. This, however, is a set-up by Lint and the Terror. Arthur rescues Karamazov, who has been shrunk and is only half Arthur's size. The two escape, but Karamazov punches Arthur in the groin and flees. Tick and Overkill storm the Terror's lair, but he and Lint escape and bomb the lair.
| 8 | 8 | "After Midnight" | Kate Dennis | Mark Ganek | February 23, 2018 |
With the Terror's location now unknown, Arthur decides to go on the move with the Tick to avoid danger, enlisting Tinfoil Kevin, the homeless man who lives outside Arthur's apartment, to watch the apartment. Arthur and Tick want to inform Superian of the Terror's plot to kill him, while Dot begins to practice shooting a gun given to her by Overkill, and Lint takes control of the Pyramid Gang. Arthur and Tick go to a book signing event of Midnight, a talking dog and former member of the Flag Five, a superhero group that Arthur idolized and the Terror killed, in order to give Superian their message. Arthur deduces that Overkill is a former member of the Flag Five, who survived the Terror's onslaught. Overkill confronts Midnight, but Midnight refuses to believe that the Terror is alive, and the two scuffle. Meanwhile, a strange car follows Arthur.
| 9 | 9 | "My Dinner with Android" | Kate Dennis | Story by : Christopher McCulloch & Jose Molina; Teleplay by : Ben Edlund & Susan Hurwitz Arneson | February 23, 2018 |
The Terror takes control of Brown Tingle Cola, a soda company he founded, using its office as his new headquarters. Arthur and the Tick are approached by two diplomats (a woman and a robot called Bakkup) from Karamazov's home country, who are searching for Karamazov, as the Terror left a tip to the embassy that Karamazov has defected from the country. Arthur and Tick search for Karamazov, as he is their only link to the weapon to kill Superian. They find Karamazov, whose body has shrunk further but retains a normal sized head. The female diplomat chases Arthur, exploding the baby stroller which she believes contains Karamazov, but following her departure, the stroller is revealed to contain a frozen turkey given to Arthur by Kevin. Meanwhile, the Terror sets his plan in motion, revealing that the VLM, a man as tall as a skyscraper which has been monitored by the military and Superian, is a crucial part of this plan, with the VLM revealed to be the man who found the Terror's teeth when Superian 'killed' him. Arthur and Tick take Karamazov to Kevin's 'office' in an old robot head to nurse him back to health. Arthur and Tick return to Arthur's apartment to find a delirious Superian, who faints.
| 10 | 10 | "Risky Bismuth" | Rosemary Rodriguez | Susan Hurwitz Arneson | February 23, 2018 |
Karamazov, now in a robot suit fashioned by Kevin, tells Arthur and Tick his story. He discovered a supply of "big bismuth" in the mountains of his own country, which he used to create a growth ray. He tested it, with Superian in attendance, but it malfunctioned and shrunk Karamazov. Karamazov's government seized his weapons to fight Superian, but the Terror seized the weapons from them. Karamazov reveals that his weapons cache and his supply of big bismuth was destroyed by the Tick (as seen in the pilot). Karamazov further reveals that big bismuth is responsible for Superian's sickness and the growth of the VLM and that the Terror plans to use the big bismuth inside of the VLM to kill Superian. Meanwhile, Dot gets word of a Pyramid Gang mission, and she and Overkill go to stop it. Overkill challenges Lint, who subdues him with gas. Dot shuts off the power to the building, but Lint uses her electrical powers to restore power, which sends out a ray, hitting the VLM, causing him to move towards the city. Karamazov reveals this is the beginning of the last part of the Terror's plan.
| 11 | 11 | "The Beginning of the End" | Romeo Tirone | Jose Molina | February 23, 2018 |
As the VLM approaches the city, Karamazov clarifies to Arthur that the Terror's plan is to use the big bismuth in the VLM as an explosion, which will kill Superian, as big bismuth is his weakness. He reveals to Arthur that his suit functions as the 'detonator.' Karamazov alters the catalyzer, disabling Terror's remote detonation. Karamazov also alters the catalyzer so that the detonation will shrink the VLM to normal size, but tells the group that there is only a 20% chance of success. Lint confronts Overkill, and their conversation reveals a past relationship between the two, also revealing that Lint used Overkill to allow the Terror to kill the Flag Five. They share a moment, with Lint offering to help Overkill, revealing the Terror's location to him. However, Overkill declines, not trusting her. Dot activates the sprinkler system and rescues Overkill. Arthur and Tick arrive at the military blockade, where they share a heart-to-heart before preparing to stop the VLM.
| 12 | 12 | "The End of the Beginning (Or the Start of the Dawn of the Age of Superheroes)" | Thor Freudenthal | Ben Edlund & David Fury | February 23, 2018 |
Arthur prepares to activate the catalyzer, but is stunned by the appearance of Superian. The catalyzer works, shrinking the VLM, with Superian surviving. His plan foiled, the Terror decides to attack the Flag Five memorial ceremony, which Arthur's mom and step-father are attending. At the memorial, Tick attacks Terror's ship while Arthur dispatches his goons. The Tick tears through the hull, leading the Terror to attempt to abandon ship, but Lint takes the escape pod before he can. The ship crashlands, and Arthur confronts the Terror, who prepares to kill him. However, Superian arrives, subduing the Terror with his frost breath power. Arthur and Dot reunite with their family, while Superian is hailed by the public for stopping the Terror. Arthur and Tick converse with Midnight, who tells the two to tread carefully in the public eye, and that "Big Brother is watching", before leaving. As Arthur and Tick walk away, an AEGIS drone flies behind the pair, before regrouping with several others.

=== Season 2 (2019) ===
| No. overall | No. in season | Title | Directed by | Written by | Original release date |
|---|---|---|---|---|---|
| 13 | 1 | "Lesson One: Think Quick!" | Romeo Tirone | Ben Edlund | April 5, 2019 |
With the Terror caught and the city freed of his grip, Arthur attempts to return to his job and limit hero activities. When his company explains that he can't be both a hero and an accountant at Fishladder and Sons, he quits his job to hero full-time. Dot flips out in a coffee shop, causing a scene, and Overkill tells her she's just processing the experiences of the previous season. Meanwhile, Tick and Arthur battle bank robbers from New England called the Donnelly Brothers and Lobstercules which attracts the attention of famous A.E.G.I.S agent Tyrannosaurus Rathbone, and Walter and Joan commiserate over their children not coming to the dinner they'd arranged.
| 14 | 2 | "A.E.G.I.S and You" | Romeo Tirone | Dan Hernandez & Benji Samit | April 5, 2019 |
With The City's local A.E.G.I.S. branch reopened, Tick and Arthur take a tour and then take a hero test. Arthur is asked to keep tabs on the Tick, whose lack of past and memory are concerns to A.E.G.I.S., and is granted a hero license. Overkill, alerted by Dangerboat of the observation drones moving in to cover the city is about to leave, but after explaining his past as a rogue from A.E.G.I.S. after the rest of his team was killed to Dot, decides to remain. Ms. Lint, regrouping after the fall of the Terror, meets with Edgelord to upgrade herself with new equipment to control all the gangs in the city. Superian, meanwhile, is struggling with a drop in his approval ratings and criticism after the events surrounding the VLM.
| 15 | 3 | "Hot Beige!" | Linda Mendoza | Kit Boss | April 5, 2019 |
Agent Commander Tyrannosaurus Rathbone addresses The City and declares the local A.E.G.I.S. office reopened and the Flag Five to be reinstated. Superian abducts Arthur to the jungles of Guatemala to discuss his dropping popularity and Arthur suggests a grand gesture. Lobstercules robs another bank and the Tick and Arthur go to the A.E.G.I.S lounge to search the police reports of the bank robbery, where they meet superhero Flexon, The Flexometric Man. He suggests searching the docks, as someone there always has a "look". Ms Lint gets her superhero tech suit from Edgelord and plans a tactical test of the suit's powers that night. Overkill calls Ty Rathbone who urges him to prove himself by going after The Duke, who killed all of Overkill's team except for him. At the docks, Arthur and Tick shake down a bookie who gives them a lead on the four lobstermen from Maine who are helping Lobstercules, telling them he'll be at the underground gambling establishment called Romeo's. Arthur goes undercover at a gambler known as the Accountant. Just as Arthur is getting close with lobsterman Donny, Ms Lint bursts in and acts like a superhero while taking down her rival, Romeo. Donny runs but Arthur manages to grab his shoe. Arthur recognizes Ms Lint, but she claims anonymity behind the 28th Amendment and that she's the superhero Joan of Arc. The episode ends with Ty Rathbone ominously feeding a white mouse to his black hole heart.
| 16 | 4 | "Blood and Cake" | Linda Mendoza | Susan Hurwitz Arneson | April 5, 2019 |
Superian carves his effigy into Devil's Tower, badly misinterpreting Arthur's advice and further eroding his popularity. This causes chaos at A.E.G.I.S, and when Arthur and Tick try to use A.E.G.I.S' crime lab to analyze Donny's shoe, they find the lab closed due to a large A.E.G.I.S. meeting. They ask Dangerboat instead. Overkill is on the trail of The Duke but is hampered by his vow to Tick to not kill. Dot reminds him that she saved Overkill's life and reverses the Tick's wish, allowing Overkill to kill again. Dangerboat begins analyzing the shoe but glitches when Tick asks about the other A.E.G.I.S machines like Dangerboat that can fly. Dangerboat locks Arthur, Tick, Overkill, and Dot inside him as he begins his high-temperature sanitation process, but Arthur gets through to him after hearing the story of Dangerboat's first partner who died resulting in Dangerboat's PTSD. Dangerboat finishes his analysis and gives Tick and Arthur leads on where Lobstercules might be hiding in the sewers. Meanwhile, Ms Lint as Joan of Arc foils her own gang to get the authorities off of her trail. Overkill and Dot infiltrate the lair of an associate of The Duke who is packaging up human furniture. While they free the human furniture, Dot uses her superpower to dodge a bullet.
| 17 | 5 | "Magic is Real" | Carol Banker | Mark Ganek | April 5, 2019 |
While at the A.E.G.I.S superhero lounge, Tick and Arthur meet Sage, the Supernumerary, while lamenting not yet finding Lobstercules in the sewers. Ms Lint appears as Joan of Arc, on tour of the A.E.G.I.S facilities. Her goal is to join the Flag Five and gain all the resources available to the team to further her criminal endeavors. Tick and Arthur return to searching the sewer, where they team up with Sage and Bronze Star, though Arthur gets separated from the group and captured by Lobstercules. Arthur finds that the Donnelly brothers are forcing Lobstercules (a mother) to rob banks for them by holding her infants hostage. Superian appears on a talk show to justify the effigy he carved into Devil's Tower, but he only makes the situation worse. Dangerboat manages to scan one of the human furniture victims and detects super tech embedded in his brain. Overkill takes the victim to Black Market Bob, who manages to remove the tech, which starts broadcasting information to a location. Bob pinpoints the location as the Duke's possible lair. The Tick rushes to save Arthur from Lobstercules and forces her into the city where Ms Lint captures her while Arthur is trying to reason with her.
| 18 | 6 | "Categorically Speaking" | Carol Banker | Adam Starks & Francesca Gailes | April 5, 2019 |
Tick and Arthur file the extensive paperwork necessary to visit Lobstercules in A.E.G.I.S detention, during the course of which Arthur meets and has a moment with A.E.G.I.S clerk Veranda. A.E.G.I.S has classified Lobstercules as a non-human cryptid and plan to send her to the lab for experimentation. A.E.G.I.S. has an open house at their headquarters in The City, and Superian, Kevin, and Dot all visit, as does Ms Lint dressed as Joan of Arc. The last form Arthur and Tick have to fill out requires the signature of the arresting hero, Joan of Arc, who refuses until Tick and Arthur tell her how destiny will call her to be a superhero. She signs just to get them to shut up. Superian confronts Joan of Arc, explaining that the adoration of fans is the best part of being a superhero. He leaves her to accost a reporter who has been saying mean things about him, taking the reporter on a fly-along and leaving him in the Guatemalan jungle. Tick and Arthur visit Lobstercules and gets her to speak. She explains that she is from Atlantis and swears Tick and Arthur to silence regarding her children. Tick and Arthur capture Lobstercules speaking on video. Doctor Agent Hobbes is forced to reclassify her as a sentient. Meanwhile on the tour, Dot sees a picture of her stepfather Walter as an A.E.G.I.S. agent.
| 19 | 7 | "Lei-Lo, Ho!" | Wendey Stanzler | Kit Boss | April 5, 2019 |
Tick and Arthur search for Lobstercules' babies using her clue, but with no success. Ms Lint calls to ask why Arthur has been acting as therapist to Superian and in the background Arthur hears the lobster babies singing. Using caller ID, they discover that Ms Lint is staying at the Lei-Lo Motel and that must be where the babies are being held. Tick, Arthur, and Kevin stake out the Lei-Lo. Inside, the Donnelly's plan to cook and eat the babies. While out buying paint, Walter receives a coded message on his second cell phone and returns home to his secret shed hideout where he receives a call from Tyrannosaurus Rathbone who tells Walter he has a mission. Dot and Overkill go in search of the Duke, and before heading out do a pre-mission ritual dance. Arthur spots one of the Donnelly brothers going into the Lei-Lo and Kevin tracks him to his room. While Tick distracts the brothers, Arthur and Kevin rescue the babies. Donny however confronts Arthur who manages to take him out. Outside Ms Lint helps capture the Donnelly brothers as she continues to grapple with her good side. Dot and Overkill infiltrate the Duke's lair, only to find it's a trap. Overkill is captured and Dot uses her time sense power to barely escape.
| 20 | 8 | "Joan!" | Wendey Stanzler | Johanna Stokes | April 5, 2019 |
Flexon, in his lawyer identity, takes on Lobstercules' case to get her released from A.E.G.I.S, while Tick and Arthur continue filling paperwork in her defense, but they are hampered by their oath to not mention the lobster babies. Dot, unconscious on the beach, is rescued by Walter. Tick, Arthur, and Kevin are babysitting the lobster babies, when Dot's and Arthur's mom Joan drops in for a visit, concerned about Walter's abrupt departure. They fill Joan in on the babies and she joins in on the babysitting. Flexon arrives at the apartment and thinks bringing up the babies will help Lobstercules' case, but Tick and Arthur convince him not to mention them. Aboard Dangerboat, Walter explains that he was an A.E.G.I.S agent assigned to watch Joan and her family after the Terror killed her husband, and that over the course of his assignment, he fell in love with Joan, marrying her after he retired. Dot is dubious of his motivations. Dangerboat explains that he tracked Overkill being launched from the house right before it exploded, but he doesn't know where he went. Superian visits Arthur's apartment in need of more therapy and Arthur reluctantly agrees. Superian admits he left the reporter, Pearl, in the Guatemalan jungle. Arthur says he has to bring him back, which Superian does, but not before threatening Pearl into silence. Miranda from A.E.G.I.S arrives at Arthur's apartment for an HQ evaluation, part of the process of becoming a member of the new Flag Five. They pass the test, with Joan explaining that they were all wrong about Arthur's diagnosis of mental illness. Realizing that the babies are hungry, Kevin buys the starfish they like, but they are reluctant to eat it until Tick chews and regurgitates the starfish into their mouths.
| 21 | 9 | "In the Woods" | Kate Dennis | Susan Hurwitz Arneson | April 5, 2019 |
The Tick and Arthur learn that they have been made members of the new Flag Five, along with Bronze Star, Sage the Supernumerary, and Joan of Arc. Flexon asks Tick and Arthur to convince Lobstercules to let Flexon use her babies as evidence for the coercion defense. The Tick convinces her to do so. Doctor Agent Hobbes travels deep into A.E.G.I.S HQ where he has Overkill strapped to a table. After villainsplaining his plans and revealing he is the Duke, he inserts a mind control device into Overkill. Aboard Dangerboat, Walter reveals his A.E.G.I.S. ID to Arthur and the Tick. They have detected that the cage used to trap Overkill is A.E.G.I.S. technology and postulate that the Duke is working with someone inside A.E.G.I.S. Walter asks Arthur to communicate with Ty Rathbone to avoid interception by the mole. He does so, and Rathbone agrees to meet them. They show him the mind control device they had removed from the human furniture, and Rathbone immediately knows who the mole is. He convinces Arthur, Tick, and Dot that he will handle it on his own. Ms Lint grapples with her evil self. She makes Edgelord her official sidekick. Henchman Frank says he can't work with her anymore if she goes good. Rathbone summons Hobbes to his office and reveals he knows he's the mole. Overkill assassinates Rathbone before he can arrest Hobbes.
| 22 | 10 | "Choose Love!" | Romeo Tirone | Ben Edlund | April 5, 2019 |
Miranda announces the death of Tyrannosaurus Rathbone. Drone footage reveals it was Overkill. Superian takes a walk on the moon to clear his head, debating whether to reverse time on Earth to the point when he was still revered, even though it might kill all of humanity. Acting Agent Commander Doctor Agent Hobbes summons Arthur to his office, asking him to turn in Dot for abetting Overkill. Arthur realizes by his lack of fear sitting in front of the bullet hole in his office that Hobbes is the mole and killed Rathbone. He asks Sage to secretly transport them out of A.E.G.I.S. HQ. Hobbes, realizing the lobster babies are at Arthur's apartment after reading Flexon's brief, assembles an attack team. The team attacks the apartment. Walter fights them off, and Kevin reveals he has a power – invisibility – and he leads them and the babies out of the apartment. Hobbes makes a deal with Ms Lint to help him in exchange for leadership of the Flag Five. He gives her a pad with access to all of A.E.G.I.S. Overkill, seemingly no longer controlled by Hobbes, calls Dot and tells her to keep away from him, implying suicide. Dot, Tick, Arthur, and Dangerboat all choose love over fear and go to save Overkill though they know it's probably a trap. Lobstercules, implanted with a mind control device, takes on Tick; Tick refuses to fight back against his friend. Ms Lint appears to be on Hobbes' side, but it's all a ruse. Edgelord is back at A.E.G.I.S. HQ stealing everything with Frank's help. Ms Lint leaves with the implant gun. Hobbes orders Overkill to shoot at Tick and Arthur. Dot distracts Overkill with her bullet dodging ability, so that Arthur can tackle Hobbes and knock the mind control device from his hands. He crushes it and frees Lobstercules and Overkill. Back at A.E.G.I.S, tentacles erupt from Rathbone's heart container, somehow reviving him through black magic or alien technology. Sometime later, Rathbone announces the cancellation of the Flag Five, Overkill and Dot have a dance party, and Tick and Arthur dash off for their next adventure. Meanwhile on the moon, an alien spaceship appears above Superian, announcing his capture as an escaped prisoner.

== Production ==
In March 2016, it was announced that Amazon Video had ordered a pilot for a The Tick reboot with Peter Serafinowicz starring as The Tick along with Griffin Newman as Arthur. Co-starring in the pilot would be Valorie Curry as Arthur's sister Dot and Brendan Hines as Superian. In April 2016, Jackie Earle Haley was cast as The Terror. In September 2016, Amazon Prime picked up the show for a full season of 12 episodes. Amazon ordered a second season of 10 episodes, which premiered on April 5, 2019. Amazon cancelled the series after two seasons. Creator Ben Edlund intended to shop the series around to other streaming services, but eventually announced he could not find a new home for the show before the contracts for the actors expired, thus officially ending the series.

== Release ==
The pilot of The Tick premiered on Amazon Prime Video on August 18, 2016. The first six episodes of the first season were released on August 25, 2017 with the remaining six episodes being released on February 23, 2018. The entire second season was released on April 5, 2019.

== Reception ==
=== Critical response ===
Review aggregation website Rotten Tomatoes reported a 90% approval rating with an average rating of 7.4/10 based on 63 critic reviews. The website's critical consensus reads, "Likeable characters add realism and heart to the tongue-in-cheek humor and high-octane action that fuels The Tick." Metacritic, which uses a weighted average, assigned a score of 72 out of 100, based on reviews from 23 critics, indicating "generally favorable reviews".

Rick Austin of Fortress of Solitude gave the show a score of 4/5 and felt that the show had managed to fix several of the flaws he saw in the pilot episode. He concluded, "With so few good superhero comedies out there, this is exactly the show the world needs."

It has been suggested that the reason for the show's cancellation was that, despite positive critical and audience reception, the show failed to draw enough viewership from the general audience to be sufficiently profitable. The Tick was not picked up by another network "despite a substantial fan and crew campaign".

=== Accolades ===
In 2018, the series was nominated for a Saturn Award in the category "Best New Media Superhero Series".

Also in 2018, the show received an Emmy nomination for its Main Title music composed by Chris Bacon.
