= Scott Speiser =

American actor and writer (born 1980)

- Born: April 14, 1980 (age 46); Chapel Hill, North Carolina, United States of America
- Occupations: Actor; Writer
- Years active: 2003–present

Scott Speiser (/skot spizer/ SKOT SPIZE-er) is an American actor and writer. He starred as Overkill in Amazon's remake of The Tick television series. He is a longtime member of the Blue Man Group stage show, and was previously a member of The Groundlings Sunday Company improvisational comedy troupe.

== Career ==
Speiser guest starred on NCIS as Agent Rafi Ali.

Speiser guest starred on Agents of S.H.I.E.L.D. as Senior Airman Campbell, Mike & Molly and Ted Lasso.
