= David Burke (American actor) =

American actor

- Born: June 18, 1967 (age 59); New Jersey, USA
- Education: College of William and Mary
- Occupation: Actor
- Spouse: Jeanie Bacharach
- Children: 2

David Burke (born June 18, 1967) is an American television actor. He attended the College of William and Mary where his most famous role was that of Eugene Morris Jerome in Brighton Beach Memoirs and as Arthur in The Tick (2001-2002).

== Career ==
Burke has appeared on many television shows in guest roles. Among the series in which he has appeared are: Law & Order, Frasier, Mr. & Mrs. Smith, Holding the Baby, Star Trek: Voyager, Malcolm in the Middle, Ghost Whisperer, Judging Amy, and Grey's Anatomy.

His recurring or starring credits include:

- Brothers & Sisters as Jack Bishop
- Joan of Arcadia as Father Ken Mallory
- The Tick as Arthur
- The Invisible Man as Kevin Fawkes
- The Crew as Paul Steadman
- Party of Five as Bill
