= Liz Vassey =

American actress (born 1972)

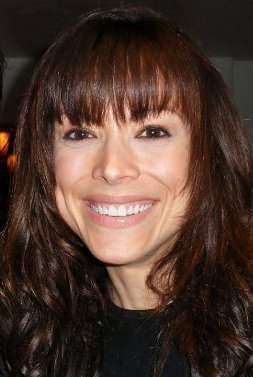
- Vassey in 2008
- Born: Elizabeth Leigh Vassey; August 9, 1972 (age 54); Raleigh, North Carolina, US
- Education: George D. Chamberlain High School, University of South Florida
- Occupation: Actress
- Years active: 1988–present
- Known for: CSI: Crime Scene Investigation; All My Children; The Tick; Brotherly Love
- Spouse: David Emmerichs (m. 2004)

Elizabeth Leigh Vassey (born August 9, 1972) is an American actress. Her most notable roles in Diagnosis Murder, "Shaker" episode (1994), include Emily Ann Sago on All My Children, Captain Liberty on The Tick, Wendy Simms on CSI: Crime Scene Investigation, Lou on Brotherly Love, and Nikki Beaumont on the web series Nikki & Nora.

== Biography ==
=== Early life and education ===
Vassey was born in Raleigh, North Carolina, but her family moved to Tampa, Florida when she was two years old. She graduated from George D. Chamberlain High School in Tampa, Florida in 1990. Later she joined the University of South Florida to take acting lessons.

=== Career ===
Vassey played teenager Emily Ann Sago on the soap opera All My Children from 1988 to 1991. From 2004 to 2005, she had a recurring role on the series Tru Calling as Dr. Carrie Allen.

She appeared in several episodes of the sitcom Two and a Half Men. In the episode "The Last Thing You Want is to Wind Up with a Hump" in 2003, in "Twanging Your Magic Clanger" and "The Crazy Bitch Gazette" (2011), and in "Nice to Meet You, Walden Schmidt" (the season premiere with Ashton Kutcher).

From 2005 to 2010, Vassey had a recurring role as Wendy Simms on CSI: Crime Scene Investigation. Starting with the tenth season, Vassey was promoted to a regular cast member and began appearing in the show's opening credits. Entertainment Weekly reported on June 1, 2010 that Vassey would not be returning for the show's eleventh season. She guested in one episode of that season.

Vassey made a cameo on Joss Whedon's web-based musical, Dr. Horrible's Sing-Along Blog, as "Fury Leika".

== Personal life ==
Vassey is married to David Emmerichs, a camera operator.

In 2002, along with fellow actress Kristin Bauer, Vassey started a company called Neurosis to a T(ee), which designs and sells slogan-covered T-shirts for women. The slogans poke fun at female worries and neuroses, often relating to relationships.

== Filmography ==
=== Film ===
Year	Title	Role	Notes
1993	Calendar Girl	Sylvia	
2000	9mm of Love	Julia	Short film
2001	Pursuit of Happiness	Renee	
2005	Man of the House	Texas Ranger Maggie Swanson	

=== Television ===
Year	Title	Role	Notes
1988–92	All My Children	Emily Ann Sago Martin	Recurring role
1989	Superboy	Student	Episode: "Birdwoman of the Swamps"
1989	The New Leave It to Beaver	Candy	Episode: "Party Line"; Episode: "Brother vs. Brother"
1991	Quantum Leap	Paula Fletcher	Episode: "Raped"
1992	Star Trek: The Next Generation	Kristin	Episode: "Conundrum"
1992	Walter & Emily		Episode: "Sis"
1992	Jake and the Fatman	Dina Rowen	Episode: "There'll Be Some Changes Made"
1992	Beverly Hills, 90210	Marcie St. Claire	Episode: "The Pit and the Pendulum"
1992	Grapevine	Janice	Episode: "The Janice and Brian Story"
1992	Parker Lewis Can't Lose	Mary	Episode: "Summer of '92"
1992	Married... with Children	Lorraine	Episode: "T-R-A Something, Something Spells Tramp"
1992	Herman's Head	Rebecca Woods	Episode: "Sperm 'n' Herman"
1992	Murphy Brown	Amy Madrid	Episode: "A Year to Remember"
1993	Quantum Leap	Barbara Whitmore	Episode: "Goodbye Norma Jean"
1993	Love, Lies & Lullabies	Chloe	TV film
1993	Bodies of Evidence	Jane Rice	Episode: "Shadows"
1993	Danger Theatre	Lexie	Episode: "Go Ahead, Fry Me"
1993	The Secrets of Lake Success	Suzy Atkins	TV miniseries
1993	Murder, She Wrote	Monica Evers / Candace Bennett	Episode: "Lone Witness"; Episode: "Love & Hate in Cabot Cove"
1994	Love & War	Stephanie	Episode: "I've Got a Crush on You"
1994	Wings	Courtney	Episode: "Hey, Nineteen"
1994	Diagnosis: Murder	Ilene Bennett	Episode: "Shaker"
1994	Saved by the Bell: Wedding in Las Vegas	Carla	TV film
1994	ER	Liz	4 episodes
1995	Pig Sty	Tess Galaway	13 episodes
1995	Dream On	Christine Copeland	Episode: "Beam Me Up, Dr. Spock"
1995	The Adventures of Captain Zoom in Outer Space	Princess Tyra	TV film
1995–97	Brotherly Love	Louise 'Lou' Davis	40 episodes
1997	Early Edition	Mona The Waitress	Episode: "Home"
1997	Home Improvement	Donna	Episode: "The Dating Game"
1998	Maximum Bob	Kathy Baker	7 episodes
1998	Fantasy Island	Brenda	Episode: "Estrogen"
1999	Dawson's Creek	Wendy Dalrymple	Episode: "Escape from Witch Island"
2000	Dharma & Greg	Kim	Episode: "Drop Dead Gorgeous"
2001	Life with David J	Barb	TV film
2001–02	The Tick	Captain Liberty	9 episodes
2002	Dragans of New York		TV film
2002	Push, Nevada	Dawn F. Mitchell	6 episodes
2003	Two and a Half Men	Kate	Episode: "The Last Thing You Want is to Wind Up with a Hump"
2003	Veritas: The Quest	Bella Nicholson	Episode: "Skulls"
2003	The Partners	Christine Ryder	TV film
2004	Nikki & Nora	Nikki Beaumont	Unsold television pilot
2005	Cooked	Dakota	TV film
2005	20 Things to Do Before You're 30		TV film
2005	Tru Calling	Dr. Carrie Allen	6 episodes
2005–10	CSI: Crime Scene Investigation	Wendy Simms	74 episodes
2007	The Cure		TV film
2008	Dr. Horrible's Sing-Along Blog	Fury Leika	Episode: "Act III"
2010–11	Two and a Half Men	Michelle	Episode: "Twanging Your Magic Clanger"; Episode: "The Crazy Bitch Gazette"; Episode: "Nice to Meet You, Walden Schmidt"
2011	Castle	Monica Wyatt	Episode: "Slice of Death"
2011	Nine	Andrea Valente	8 episodes
2011–12	Necessary Roughness	Gabrielle Pittman	Episode: "Baggage Claim"; Episode: "Goal Line"; Episode: "Slumpbuster"
2012	Sexting in Suburbia	Rachel Van Cleve	TV movie
2012	Last Hours in Suburbia	Ann	TV film
2019	The Tick	Lobstercules (voice)	4 episodes
2022	NCIS: Los Angeles	ATF SAC Kerry Adams	2 episodes in season 14
2023	A Million Little Things	Professor Andrea Craft	2 episodes in season 5

=== Web ===
Year	Title	Role	Notes
2008–09	3 Way	Sienna / Mikki Majors	4 episodes
2014	Nikki & Nora	Nikki Beaumont	7 episodes, also executive producer
2017—	Riley Parra	Dr. Gillian Hunt	Web series Lead

== Awards ==
- 1990 Daytime Emmy Award for Outstanding Juvenile Female in a Drama Series on All My Children (nominated).
