= Indecent (disambiguation) =

Indecent is a word meaning "inappropriate".

Indecent may also refer to:

- Indecent exposure, a deliberate exposure in a public place
- Indecent (play), a play by Paula Vogel
