= List of The Venture Bros. characters =

This is a list of main and recurring fictional characters from The Venture Bros., a comic science fiction television series aired on Adult Swim from 2003 to 2018.

== Overview ==
Character		Portrayed by	Appearances									
Character		Portrayed by	First	Season 1	Season 2	Season 3	Season 4		Season 5	Special	Season 6	Season 7
Character		Portrayed by	First	Season 1	Season 2	Season 3	Part 1	Part 2	Season 5	Special	Season 6	Season 7
Team Venture
Dr. Thaddeus "Rusty" Venture		James Urbaniak	"The Terrible Secret of Turtle Bay"	Main	Main	Main	Main	Main	Main	Main	Main	Main
Brock Fitzgerald Samson		Patrick Warburton	"The Terrible Secret of Turtle Bay"	Main	Main	Main	Main	Main	Main	Main	Main	Main
Henry Allen "Hank" Venture	#14	Christopher McCulloch	"The Terrible Secret of Turtle Bay"	Main								
Henry Allen "Hank" Venture	#15	Christopher McCulloch	"Powerless in the Face of Death"		Main	Main	Main	Main	Main	Main	Main	Main
Dean Venture	#14	Michael Sinterniklaas	"The Terrible Secret of Turtle Bay"	Main								
Dean Venture	#15	Michael Sinterniklaas	"Powerless in the Face of Death"		Main	Main	Main	Main	Main	Main	Main	Main
Sergeant Hatred		Brendon Small	"Fallen Arches"		Guest							
Sergeant Hatred		Christopher McCulloch	"The Invisible Hand of Fate"			Recurring	Main	Main	Main	Main	Main	Main
Dr. Jonas "J.J." Venture Jr.		James Urbaniak	"Return to Spider-Skull Island"	Recurring	Recurring	Recurring	Recurring	Recurring	Recurring	Main	Guest	Guest
Dermott Fictel		Doc Hammer	"The Buddy System"			Guest	Recurring	Recurring	Recurring	Main		Guest
Sirena Ong		Cristin Milioti	"Hostile Makeover"								Guest	Main
The Order of the Triad
Dr. Byron Orpheus		Steven Rattazzi	"Eeney, Meeney, Miney... Magic!"	Recurring	Recurring	Recurring	Recurring	Recurring	Guest	Main		Guest
The Alchemist		Dana Snyder	"Fallen Arches"		Guest	Guest	Guest	Guest	Guest	Main	Guest	Guest
Jefferson Twilight		Charles Parnell	"Fallen Arches"		Guest	Guest	Guest	Guest	Guest	Main		Guest
Venture acquaintances
Billy Quizboy		Doc Hammer	"The Terrible Secret of Turtle Bay"	Recurring	Recurring	Recurring	Recurring	Recurring	Recurring	Main	Recurring	Recurring
Pete White		Christopher McCulloch	"The Terrible Secret of Turtle Bay"	Recurring	Recurring	Recurring	Recurring	Recurring	Recurring	Guest	Recurring	Recurring
Triana Orpheus		Lisa Hammer	"Eeny, Meeny, Miney...Magic!"	Recurring	Recurring	Recurring	Recurring	Recurring				
The Pirate Captain		Christopher McCulloch	"Ghosts of the Sargasso"	Guest	Guest	Recurring	Guest	Guest		Main	Recurring	Guest
The Guild of Calamitous Intent
The Monarch		Christopher McCulloch	"The Terrible Secret of Turtle Bay"	Main	Main	Main	Main	Main	Main	Main	Main	Main
Dr. Mrs. The Monarch (née Dr. Girlfriend)		Doc Hammer	"The Terrible Secret of Turtle Bay"	Main	Main	Main	Main	Main	Main	Main	Main	Main
Gary "General / Henchman 21" Fischer		Doc Hammer	"The Terrible Secret of Turtle Bay"	Main	Main	Main	Main	Main	Main	Main	Main	Main
Henchman 24		Christopher McCulloch	"The Terrible Secret of Turtle Bay"	Main	Main	Main	Guest	Recurring			Voice	Flashback
The Sovereign		Christopher McCulloch	"The Trial of the Monarch"	Guest	Guest	Guest	Guest	Guest	Guest	Main	Voice	Flashback
Dr. Henry Killinger		Christopher McCulloch	"I Know Why the Caged Bird Kills"		Guest	Guest		Deleted scene	Guest	Main		
The Revenge Society
The Phantom Limb		James Urbaniak	"Home Insecurity"	Recurring	Recurring	Guest	Guest	Guest	Guest	Main	Main	Main
Professor Richard "Incorrigible" Impossible		Stephen Colbert	"The Terrible Secret of Turtle Bay"	Recurring	Recurring					Main		
Professor Richard "Incorrigible" Impossible		Peter McCulloch	"The Terrible Secret of Turtle Bay"	Guest								
Professor Richard "Incorrigible" Impossible		Christopher McCulloch	"The Terrible Secret of Turtle Bay"			Recurring						
Professor Richard "Incorrigible" Impossible		Bill Hader	"The Terrible Secret of Turtle Bay"				Recurring	Recurring				
Baron Werner Ünderbheit		T. Ryder Smith	"Home Insecurity"	Recurring	Guest			Guest	Guest	Main		
Zero (Scott Hall)		Christopher McCulloch	"The Lepidopterists"			Guest		Guest		Main		
The Council of Thirteen
Wide Wale		Hal Lublin	"Hostile Makeover"								Main	Main
Red Death		Clancy Brown	"Red Means Stop"								Guest	Main

== Team Venture ==
Team Venture are the central characters in the show; they previously lived resided in a fortified compound in Colorado Springs that was also the headquarters for their company, "Venture Industries." Following the destruction of the compound in Season Six and Dr. Venture's inheritance of his brother's fortune, they move to the Ventech Tower at Columbus Circle in Manhattan.

=== Dr. Rusty Venture ===
Dr. Thaddeus "Rusty" Venture (voiced by James Urbaniak) is a Super-Scientist and a former child star. He is father to two sons Hank Venture and Dean Venture, and is later revealed in the show to be the illegitimate father of Dermott Fictel. He lives in the Venture Compound, the estate which he inherited from his late father, Jonas Venture Sr. He is always working on coming up with new inventions and ideas to try profit off of, but his creations have little influence in the super science world due to their uselessness and poor construction, they are incredibly prone to breaking and malfunctioning at any given moment. However, He is shown to be very skilled in biology, especially when it comes to cloning technology, which is unfortunately illegal. He is constantly inventing to try to live up to his father’s legacy, but is often mocked and belittled by others for this.

As a child, he was known as the star of “The Rusty Venture Show”, an in-universe fictional cartoon that was loosely based on the adventures of the former ‘Team Venture’ and a direct parody of Johnny Quest. The show would depict Rusty and Team Venture going on adventures to a multitude of locations around the world, fighting villains and solving puzzles, but many events were dramatised, and did not accurately depict the real events that took place. Behind the scenes, Rusty was frequently kidnapped and tortured by the arch-nemesis’s of Jonas Venture, and experienced physical, psychological and sexual abuse at the hands of Team Venture. These memories still continue to haunt him in the present as he is clearly shown to experience PTSD, and abuses drugs he nicknames ‘diet pills’ as a way to cope with stress.

In the first few episodes of Season 1, He is shown to have frequent nightmares of himself in the womb, often consuming his twin in utero. When later, In “Return To Spider-Skull Island”, He is rushed to the hospital with what appeared to be a tumour. After the surgery was performed, it was discovered that it was not in-fact a tumour, but the aforementioned twin who he had carried inside of him for 43 years. The twin’s first instinct was to attempt to kill Dr. Venture, but after a short struggle the two managed to reconcile. The twin decided to take on the name Jonas “JJ” Venture Jr. after the late Jonas Venture Sr. , And was given the X-2 and ownership of Spider-Skull Island by Dr. Venture as a means of sharing the assets their father passed onto them.

=== Brock Samson ===
Brock Fitzgerald Samson (voiced by Patrick Warburton) is the Venture family's bodyguard. He was born in Omaha, Nebraska, to a single mother, and is of Swedish, Polish, and Winnebago descent. He attended the same university as Dr. Venture until he was expelled for accidentally killing one of his football team's teammates. Despite holding a license to kill, Brock eschews guns and instead favors a Ka-Bar knife as his signature weapon. He grapples with his role in the world and his purpose, guided by a personal code of ethics concerning innocents and whom he will eliminate if they pose a threat to himself or the Ventures. Brock owns an orange 1969 Dodge Hemi Charger named "Adrianne", frequently seen driving or shirtlessly washing at the Venture compound. Following the explosion of the car carrying Henchman 24, H.E.L.P.eR.'s head was briefly embedded in Brock's chest, leading to 24's death; the head was later removed and replaced with a metal plate. Brock is reassigned back as the Venture's bodyguard after Dr. Venture moves to New York City and inherits the fortune left to him by his late brother JJ.

=== Hank Venture ===
Henry Allen "Hank" Venture (voiced by Christopher McCulloch) is the eldest son of Dr. Venture. He emerges as the more extroverted and adventurous of the pair, drawn to action and thrill-seeking, often envisioning himself as a vigilante superhero. In season 4, he exhibits increased rebelliousness following Brock's departure, even losing his virginity to an older woman who happens to be his best friend's mother. After briefly affiliating with former Henchman 21's rendition of S.P.H.I.N.X., Hank acquires the power suit of former S.P.H.I.N.X. member Countess, donning it until it is stolen and destroyed. This incident leads to Hank undergoing physical therapy due to muscle atrophy. In season 6, he opts out of college and takes on a job as a delivery boy at a pizzeria. Additionally, he embarks on a romantic relationship with Sirena Ong, the daughter of his father's current Guild-assigned villain, Wide Wale. In season 7, Hank receives a concussion and slips into a coma after discovering Sirena's infidelity with Dean but eventually recovers.

=== Dean Venture ===
Dean Venture (voiced by Michael Sinterniklaas) is the younger son of Dr. Venture, Dean is the younger fraternal twin with red hair. Despite being more timid than Hank, he exhibits signs of greater emotional maturity. Dean garners more favor from their father, who grooms him to succeed as the heir to Venture Industries. Like his brother, Dean has faced death over a dozen times, only to be replaced by an exact clone each time, devoid of memories of his death. Following a breakup with Triana and the revelation of his clone status, Dean adopts a more emo persona, donning a black "speedsuit" and relocating from his childhood bedroom, displaying reluctance to join family adventures. However, Hank's optimism and familial support pull him out of his emotional slump. In season 6, Dean enrolls at the fictional Stuyvestant University in New York, excelling as a philosophy student and befriending Brown Widow, his roommate. In season 7, he engages in an affair with Hank's girlfriend, Sirena Ong, but later regrets his actions.

=== H.E.L.P.eR. ===
H.E.L.P.eR. (voiced by Christopher McCulloch; credited as "Soul-Bot"): H.E.L.P.eR., short for Humanoid Electronic Lab Partner Robot, serves as the Venture family's helper robot, communicating through electronic beeps. Despite his sensitivity, the Ventures often regard him as an old appliance or pet. Throughout their adventures, H.E.L.P.eR. frequently gets smashed to pieces but miraculously appears repaired by the next episode.

=== Sergeant Hatred ===
Sergeant Hatred, also known as Courtney Robert Haine, is voiced by Brendon Small in season 2 and Christopher McCulloch from season 3 onward. He serves as Brock's former supervisor in the O.S.I., the husband of Native American villainess Princess Tinyfeet, and the Venture family's bodyguard. He is a large, muscular man with a giant red 'H' tattooed on his face, often seen wearing military fatigues. Despite being a convicted sex offender for having slept with a 17-year-old, he is liked and respected throughout the supervillain community for his unfailing politeness and generosity; certain episodes also reveal that he knows his sexual attraction to teenagers is wrong, and tries to keep it in check using a medication called "nomolestol" and electroshock therapy. He is known for his caring nature beneath his battle-hardened exterior. It's implied through flashbacks that his ephebophilia is possibly a side effect from a super soldier experiment done on him, which also causes him to gradually grow breasts.

=== Dermott Fictel ===
Dermott Fictel (voiced by Doc Hammer) is an obnoxious teenager who first appears in "The Buddy System"; he was hinted to be the son of Brock Samson. Dermott is a compulsive liar and frequently interjects wild, and often clearly false, claims about his abilities and past deeds into unrelated conversations. He is Hank's best friend and occasionally visits the Venture compound from the nearby trailer park where he and his "mother" live. In "Everybody Comes to Hank's", Hank sleeps with Nikki Fictel (voiced by Kate McKinnon), whom Dermott knows as his older sister, but is actually his mother. His real father is also revealed to be Rusty, making him Hank and Dean's half-brother. He stays behind when the Venture family moves to New York and later joins the OSI, being accepted as an operative despite his lack of training, thanks to a good word put in for him by Dr. Venture.

== Venture acquaintances ==
=== Dr. Jonas Venture Jr. ===
Dr. Jonas Venture Jr., also known as J.J. (voiced by James Urbaniak) is Dr. Venture's deformed twin, who was absorbed by Rusty in the womb and surgically freed from Rusty's body after being mistaken for a tumor. Although he has the body of an infant, he has an adult appearance and seems to have inherited his father's brilliance. He is scientifically astute, hard-working, attractive to women, and a multi-billionaire CEO of a profitable corporation. However, his worship of his father causes the original Team Venture to dislike him greatly, as he ignores their importance to his father's life, business, and legacy. JJ dies in "All This and Gargantua-2" when he sacrifices himself to prevent his space station, Gargantua-2, from harming people, when it self-destructs due to sabotage from The Investors. In his will, he bequeaths his fortune, the New York City Headquarters, and technology patents to his brother.

=== Triana Orpheus ===
Triana Orpheus (voiced by Lisa Hammer) is Dr. Orpheus's 17-year-old quasi-goth daughter. She has purple hair and is fairly friendly with the Venture twins. She and Dean become close until they have a major fight and fall out after she chooses to date another boy named Raven over Dean. In season four, it is revealed that she has inherited her father's abilities when she encounters her father's mystical mentor, who purposely took up residence in her closet because of her power.

=== Pete White ===
Pete White (voiced by Christopher McCulloch) is an albino computer scientist and co-founder of Conjectural Technologies. He attended college with Venture, Samson, Baron Ünderbheit, and Monarch, where he hosted a new wave radio show called "The White Room". After earning a doctorate in computer science, White and Billy Quizboy collaborated on a Jeopardy!-style game show called QuizBoys, with Pete as the host and Billy as a contestant. However, they were fired for cheating and rigging the shows in their favor. Despite a brief falling out, Pete eventually reunited with Billy. They took up residence in a trailer near the Venture Compound. Like Venture and Quizboy, White is skilled and knowledgeable in super science and technology but tends to be lazy and half-hearted in his efforts. In season six, after Dr. Venture inherits his brother's company and fortune, Pete and Billy move to New York City with the Venture family. There, they become leading scientists for Dr. Venture, assisting him in inventing breakthrough technology to sell through Ventech.

=== Billy Quizboy ===
William Whalen, a.k.a. Master Billy Quizboy (voiced by Doc Hammer) is an adult and self-proclaimed "boy genius" with a speech impediment and growth hormone deficiency. Despite suffering from hydrocephalus, his intellect remains unaffected. He gained recognition as a contestant on the game show Quizboys, hosted by Pete White. When White cheated on his behalf, they were both disqualified from the show, and Billy's winnings were seized by the SEC. Seeking employment, White and Billy approached Dr. Venture, but were rejected. Later, in a misunderstanding, Billy lost a hand and an eye in a dogfight. Subsequently, he was recruited by Brock Samson and Hunter Gathers, who equipped him with a mechanical hand and camera eye for undercover work. While spying on Professor Hamilton Fantomas, Billy suffered an accident that led to the creation of Phantom Limb and the loss of his left eye once again. Despite lacking formal education, he became a medical doctor, neurogeneticist, and co-founder of Conjectural Technologies. He briefly joined the Order of the Triad after performing brain surgery on the Outrider. In season 5, his old nemesis Augustus St. Cloud became his and White's designated arch-enemy. In season 6, he and Peter relocate to New York City with the Venture family to assist Dr. Venture in developing breakthrough technology for the Ventech brand.

=== The Pirate Captain ===
The Pirate Captain (voiced by Christopher McCulloch) is the leader of the "ghost pirates" in "Ghosts of the Sargasso". Following his initial encounter with the Venture family, he took up residence on the X-2 after facing challenges finding employment. When Jonas Jr. acquired the ship, he hired the captain, who has only been addressed as "The Captain" thus far. He lived with Jonas Jr. on Spider Skull Island, assuming roles such as butler, caretaker, and right-hand man. The Captain consistently refers to Jonas as "Chairman". Subsequently, after J.J.'s death, he becomes an employee of Dr. Venture upon inheriting J.J.'s New York City business. The Captain is also a recovering addict, falling off the wagon after being dosed with a tranquilizer.

=== Bobbi St. Simone ===
Bobbi St. Simone (voiced by Jane Lynch) is the proprietor of a sanctuary for cybernetic animals. In the 1960s, she was an actress in a bikini movie who had an affair with Jonas Venture, who also bestowed upon her invisibility powers. Following the failure of her film, Jonas coerced her to work for the O.S.I. as a mole within The Guild of Calamitous Intent. She later assumed the identity of Madame Majeure after falling in love with and marrying Force Majeure. However, she fled with her daughter Debbie after Force Majeure was murdered by The Sovereign. Bobbi struck a deal with Dr. Venture to transfer her powers to her daughter, implying that this was in exchange for Debbie's eggs, making her Hank and Dean's biological grandmother.

=== The Order of the Triad ===
==== Dr. Byron Orpheus ====
Dr. Byron Orpheus (voiced by Steven Rattazzi) is a necromancer who rents a portion of the Venture Compound and is friendly with Dr. Venture. Along with Brock, he is one of the few associates of Dr. Venture who displays competence and morals, although his pomposity tends to detract from his abilities. His speech is filled with overly dramatic phrases, delivered in a theatrically grandiose voice with emphasis on mundane topics, usually accompanied by ominous trumpet-laden music. After witnessing Dr. Venture's various enemies, he develops a fervent desire for a nemesis of his own and is later given the opportunity when the Guild approves his request for one in the season 2 episode "Fallen Arches", holding a series of interviews for the position. He is fiercely protective of Hank and Dean Venture, after being responsible for their "death" at the end of Season 1, only to find out the truth about the boys in Season 2. He is the father of Triana Orpheus, who lived with him on the Venture Compound until she moved in with Orpheus's ex-wife after breaking up with Dean Venture. By season 7, Orpheus and the Order of the Triad move to New York City in order to be closer to the Ventures.

==== Jefferson Twilight ====
Jefferson Twilight (voiced by Charles Parnell) is an old friend of Dr. Orpheus, Jefferson Twilight is a dhampir who fights Blaculas (black vampires) for a living, wielding two swords. He has diabetes and low blood sugar, leading him to crave sugared liquids. His left eye is discolored, functioning as a magical Blacula tracker he calls the "Blood Eye". The episode "What Goes Down Must Come Up" reveals much of his backstory, including that his mother was taken by marauding Blaculas when he was ten and he was a tank commander in the USMC. Initially upset about lacking a magical ability, it is discovered that he acts as a bridge between worlds.

==== The Alchemist ====
The Alchemist (voiced by Dana Snyder) is an old friend of Dr. Orpheus who seeks to find the philosopher's stone and a cure for AIDS. Unlike Twilight and Orpheus, he appears less serious about his endeavors and prefers mixing business with pleasure. However, his true stance on the Triad was revealed in the episode "Showdown at Cremation Creek", where he expressed a commitment to balancing the universe rather than engaging in constant battles against supervillains. He is openly gay and a fan of Jimmy Buffett. He shares a friendship with Hank, seeing similarities between them. Sometimes referred to as "Al", it's unclear if this is his real name or simply a nickname. He harbors a strong dislike for the internet after discovering his former boyfriend's infidelity on MySpace. In "Everybody Comes to Hank's", it's revealed he was previously in a relationship with Shore Leave, but the latter erased his memory of it due to the Alchemist's perceived clinginess. In "OSI Love You", he and Shore Leave share an amorous video chat, suggesting they reconciled.

=== Original Team Venture ===
- Dr. Jonas Venture Sr. (voiced by Paul Boocock): Deceased father of Dr. Rusty Venture, Jonas Junior, and as of season 7, it is revealed that he is also Monarch's father. He was the foremost super scientist and adventurer of his time, creating what is now known as Venture Industries and leading the original Team Venture. Despite his public image as a brilliant scientist and superhero, Jonas was revealed to be a manipulative, sociopathic womanizer with questionable morals and ethics, considered by the Guild to have been a greater villain than any of those he fought. He appeared to view Rusty as an unplanned and unwanted birth, often ignoring his son's existence in favor of drinking, partying, and pursuing sexual encounters. When he did acknowledge Rusty, he subjected him to years of emotional manipulation and abuse. Season 7 reveals that Jonas blackmailed his best friend Blue Morpho with a sex tape showing him cheating on his wife, forcing Morpho to do his dirty work for him. This involved coercing Morpho's sidekick, Kano, into joining Team Venture and impregnating Morpho's wife under the guise of "assisting" with their infertility issues. Morpho's wife gave birth to a baby fathered by Jonas, who would later grow up to be Monarch. When Morpho died in a plane crash, Jonas transferred his brain into a robot body, naming him Venturion, an act that disgusted and horrified the original Team Venture. When Venturion malfunctioned and attacked Rusty Venture, Kano fatally disabled it, and Jonas disposed of its remains. Venturion's body was captured by Dr. Zinn and the Guild of Calamitous Intent, who reprogrammed him into a villain called Vendata. He later confronts and kills Jonas by ejecting him into space. Team Venture recovered his remains and embedded them in the ProBLEM device on the station, keeping him in stasis until he could be saved. Years later, his son JJ found the ProBLEM after Gargantua-1 crashed on Earth. Unaware of its contents, he placed it in the lobby of Ventech headquarters as an art piece, inadvertently wiring it into the building's security and technology. Despite his physical death, his brain remained alive and used the building's connection to upload his consciousness, haunting Dr. Venture and his family. Through the building's Wi-Fi, he reveals his true purpose for Venturion/Vendata to Rusty and the original Team Venture: to transfer his consciousness into Vendata's brain, using the robot as a temporary vessel until Rusty could clone him a new body. This plan was thwarted by Vendata/Blue Morpho, who destroyed the ProBLEM machine in a virtual reality fight with Jonas.
- The Action Man, whose real name is Rodney (voiced by Christopher McCulloch), is a retired American supersoldier with flatulence problems and "plastic knees" that hinder his movements. He married Major Tom's widow, Jeannie, after Tom's tragic accident. Like Jonas, he was not well trained with children and was hinted to have had some bad moments with young Rusty. He had a habit of waking up Rusty Venture back in the old days by placing an unloaded gun against the sleeping boy's head and pulling the trigger, then saying, "Not today, Rusty". According to Rose, Rodney was a womanizer and a junkie, both of which he denied, claiming it was all in the past and never cheated on Jeannie, which is most likely a lie. "Action Man" is also the name of Hasbro's original 12 Inch GI Joe figures, released outside the United States. The Action Man moved to a retirement community in Boca Raton, Florida, where he is alone following the death of Jeannie. He briefly had Dr. Entmann as a roommate, only to accidentally crush him with his rocking chair while Dr. Entmann was in a shrunken-down state. He later dates fellow retired superhero, and Billy Quizboy's mother, Rose, and moves in with Colonel Gentleman.
- Colonel Horace Gentleman (voiced by Christopher McCulloch impersonating Sean Connery): A retired member of the original Team Venture and later ersatz leader of the reformed Team Venture. He is a Scottish gentleman and adventurer in the vein of Allan Quatermain and James Bond. The influence is apparent in the similarity of his voice to that of Sean Connery, who has played both characters in movies. He dresses in an old-fashioned British suit, complete with cane and fedora. It is briefly implied that he is a pederast, and this was later confirmed by the creators. In the second season, Hank and Dean find him apparently dead of unspecified causes; however, it is revealed in "Now Museum-Now You Don't" that he was merely in a diabetic coma and is still alive. He is an ethnic/gender chauvinist, and has a penchant for writing out random lists in his notebook. He briefly bears a grudge against Rusty Venture for breaking the heart of his stepdaughter, Dr. Quymn, for whom he has retained some affection. Col. Gentleman lives in Tangier, it formerly being a haven for the world's elite and greatest intellectuals, but in recent years he has realized that he is the only one left, and is dejected that Kiki has broken up with him for the last time. At the end of season 5, he realizes that there is no reason for him to stay in Tangier anymore and moves back to the United States, becoming the Action Man's new roommate.
- Kano (voiced by Christopher McCulloch): A retired member of the original Team Venture, Kano is a master of martial arts and an accomplished pilot, likely inspired by the Green Hornet's assistant, Kato. In earlier episodes, he never speaks and communicates only through origami and sparse gestures; however, this is attributed to a vow of silence he took, revealed in the episode "ORB". This vow was made when he took a great man from the world, which Brock believed to be Jonas Venture Sr. As described by Col. Gentleman, his hands are "powerful enough to crush a boulder, yet delicate enough to crush a butterfly." Although not a villain, his silent demeanor, fighting skills, and brute strength correspond with the bodyguard/henchman archetype found in many works of fiction, with particular similarities to Oddjob. In addition to his skill in fighting and origami, Kano also appears to be a capable aircraft pilot. Kano has also displayed the ability to breathe fire in the episode "Now Museum-Now You Don't". On the DVD commentary, it is revealed that his name originates from "Volcano". Season 7 revealed that Kano was originally the bodyguard of the Blue Morpho, The Monarch's father. Kano was forced into the original Team Venture away from Blue Morpho after Jonas had blackmailed Morpho. When Jonas resurrected the Blue Morpho as the cyborg Venturion after his death in a plane crash, Venturion malfunctioned and attacked Rusty, forcing Kano to snap his neck. According to the other members of the original team, Kano never spoke again after this event, thus "the great man" whom Kano killed before taking his vow of silence.
- Otto Aquarius (voiced by T. Ryder Smith): A retired member of the original Team Venture, Otto Aquarius is an exiled son of Atlantis. He is half-human and half-Atlantean, granting him a greatly extended life-span and the power to communicate telepathically with sea creatures. Aquarius converted to either the Church of Jesus Christ of Latter-day Saints (according to the special features section of the Season 1 DVD) or the Jehovah's Witnesses (according to Christopher McCulloch's blog), though his bizarre appearance often sabotages his attempts at evangelism. Due to his newfound faith, he is now a pacifist, which seems to confirm that he is a Jehovah's Witness.
- Dr. Entmann (voiced by Stephen DeStefano): A tiny man left abandoned in a nuclear fallout shelter, Dr. Entmann was previously a heroic figure known as Humongeloid, standing at 15 feet tall, flabby, and curly-haired. Brock Samson discovers Dr. Entmann in a disused and abandoned lab below the Venture Compound, where he had been trapped for some 30 years since an experiment to shrink him went disastrously wrong. Dr. Entmann moves in with Action Man but is later accidentally killed when Action Man crushes him.
- Swifty (voiced by Brendon Small): An African-American boxer and former bodyguard to Dr. Jonas Venture. In flashbacks, Swifty is shown using a pair of jet-powered boots. Currently, he has dementia due to years of boxing and works as a janitor on Spider-Skull Island.
- Hector (voiced by Brendon Small): A Hispanic boy and childhood friend of Rusty Venture. Seen in a flashback, he used an Aztec calendar to prevent an arrow from injuring Jonas Venture. Hector then joined the original Team Venture as Rusty's companion. However, as revealed in "Powerless in the Face of Death", in the present day, Rusty has no recollection of Hector or their adventures together. Hector reveals that he has been living in a part of the Venture compound closed off by Rusty years prior, unaware that it had been closed or that Jonas Venture had died, at which point Rusty unceremoniously evicts him. Hector appears to be the proxy of Hadji from Jonny Quest in the original Team Venture.
- Ook Ook: A caveman-like member of the team. In the present day, Ook Ook's body is encased in ice for unknown reasons.

== O.S.I. ==
The Office of Secret Intelligence is a branch of the United States government that handles supervillain activity, both combating groups of supervillains or assisting super scientists and superheroes with their Guild of Calamitous Intent-assigned archenemies. A pastiche of G.I. Joe and S.H.I.E.L.D., in the 1980s they fought against the supervillain organization S.P.H.I.N.X. in the Pyramid Wars, during which the original S.P.H.I.N.X. was defeated. The O.S.I. operates from a hovering base based on the helicarrier and seems to answer to a division known as the Misters who are the go-between with the "Secret President."

- General Timothy Treister (voiced by Toby Huss): Commander of the O.S.I., he is a tough, no-nonsense, highly energetic military man. He is first mentioned in "Mid-Life Chrysalis", but first appears in person in "The Family That Slays Together, Stays Together"; after Brock Samson goes on the run from the hit put on him by Molotov Cocktease, Treister leads the effort to find and debrief Samson. He later shows up to help coordinate between the O.S.I., S.P.H.I.N.X., the Guild of Calamitous Intent, the Revenge Society, and the Peril Partnership during Zeus and Zero's rampage across the world's sidekicks. In "Operation P.R.O.M.", Treister reveals he is dying of testicular cancer, but has been fooled by Mister Doe and Mister Cardholder into thinking he has been turned into a Hulk after experimental gamma ray chemotherapy. After finally meeting with Col. Gathers, revealing he has discovered Doe and Cardholder are Guild double agents, he entrusts O.S.I. back to Gathers and shoots himself off into space in order to have his cancer cured by "alien technology". Treister reappears in "All this and Gargantua-2", where his frozen body is taken aboard the titular ship and upon being awoken believes that Billy and JJ are aliens and goes on a rampage after misinterpreting them as being hostile. He and JJ sacrifice themselves to stop Gargantua-2's self-destruction from hurting anyone, during which it is revealed that, as a result of the solar radiation his body was subjected to while he was in space, Treister actually is a Hulk-like creature.
- Mister Doe and Mister Cardholder (voiced by Doc Hammer and Christopher McCulloch respectively): Two Mister-level agents of O.S.I. They first appear in "The Lepidopterists" to assist Dr. Jonas Venture Jr. in his fight against his newly assigned archenemy Monarch, as they plan on capturing The Monarch for killing so many previous archenemies. They regularly appear as assistants to General Treister and are even made to guard the Venture family during "Blood of the Father, Heart of Steel" before Sgt. Hatred is assigned to them. In "Operation P.R.O.M.", they reveal to Col. Gathers that they are Guild moles sent to trick Treister into thinking he has been turned into a Hulk, to prove to the President that Treister should be removed from his position and they should take his place. Their plan is foiled when Treister reveals to Gathers that he has discovered that they are moles and that Mile High has been working for him as well.
- Gen. Hunter Gathers (voiced by Christopher McCulloch): Brock's former mentor from when he was in training for the O.S.I. Gathers has since gone into hiding after undergoing sex reassignment surgery (SRS), taking a job as a dancer at Night 'N Ales, a strip club. The character is modeled on Hunter S. Thompson, and his name is a play on the term hunter-gatherer. Other than Brock, Gathers was the only O.S.I. agent who believed the Guild was still in existence in the late eighties, as seen in "The Invisible Hand of Fate". Despite being extraordinarily eccentric, he seems to sincerely care about his job and defending his country. He also taught Brock the strict rule of never killing women or children, as that differentiated them from the "baddies". This is something he used to his advantage when he went rogue from the O.S.I., who then sent Brock to kill him. He is apparently a member of Molotov Cocktease's "Black Hearts" assassination guild, as shown in the scene following the end credits of "The Family That Slays Together, Stays Together (Part II)". However, despite the SRS, he still has the same face and voice as before, including a perpetual five o'clock shadow. The sex reassignment and apparent betrayal of the O.S.I. were revealed in the Season 4 opener to have been an elaborate ruse to infiltrate the Black Hearts; when Gathers and Samson were captured by Sphinx agents, Gathers revealed himself as an undercover Sphinx officer. In "Pinstripes & Poltergeists", it is revealed that Gathers and other members of the O.S.I., disgusted with its ineffectual bureaucracy, eventually quit the O.S.I. and took S.P.H.I.N.X's name and equipment to form an organization capable of covertly and effectively combating super-powered villains against whom the O.S.I is powerless. S.P.H.I.N.X. seeks to terminate villains who do not abide by the rules of organized villainy mandated by institutions like the Guild of Calamitous Intent. Hunter surrenders command of S.P.H.I.N.X. to 21 after he is promoted to O.S.I.'s General.
- Shore Leave/Holy Diver (voiced by Doc Hammer): A former O.S.I. agent fired for violating O.S.I.'s don't ask, don't tell policy. Shore Leave had joined Hunter Gathers in S.P.H.I.N.X.. In Pinstripes & Poltergeists, it is revealed that he and Mile High faked being a couple as well as their conversion to religious fanaticism, for their cover. He started flirting with the Alchemist in the last episode of the 4th season and ended up making out with him. It is also revealed in "Everybody Comes To Hank's" that he and the Alchemist were briefly in a sexual relationship, but Shore Leave broke it off and wiped the Alchemist's memory when he became too "possessive" and dumped his boyfriend to move in with Shore Leave.
- Mile High/Sky Pilot (voiced by Christopher McCulloch): A former O.S.I. agent fired for violating O.S.I.'s don't ask, don't tell policy. He had joined Hunter Gathers in Sphinx. In the episode Pinstripes & Poltergeists, it is revealed that he and Shore Leave faked being a couple as well as their conversion to religious fanaticism for their cover. His name is a reference to the mile high club, as well as to the 1968 song "Sky Pilot" by Eric Burdon & The Animals. In the season finale "Operation: P.R.O.M." it is revealed he was a double-agent working for the O.S.I..
- Dr. Vulcano (voiced by Brendon Small): A surgeon who performs sex reassignment surgery on Hunter Gathers in "Assassinanny 911". Later, he is seen assisting the Nazis in their creation of the dog containing Hitler's soul and removing H.E.L.P.eR's head from Brock's chest in "Blood of the Father, Heart of Steel", where he is also revealed to be a member of S.P.H.I.N.X. under Hunter Gathers' command. In "O.S.I. Love You", Dr. Vulcano is seen to have been recruited into O.S.I.
- Headshot (voiced by Bill Hader): O.S.I.'s top marksman, who worked on the mission to capture Monstroso and Molotov Cocktease. He is in a relationship with Amber. In a moment of infidelity, he attempts to examine who he believes to be the captive Molotov Cocktease, only to discover Amber in her place. More shocking to him is the truth about Amber's hair color. It is heavily implied that Headshot accidentally shot and killed the head of the Guild, The Sovereign, while the latter was escaping in eagle form. It was later confirmed that the Sovereign had died, but it is unknown whether Headshot's action gained any acknowledgment.
- Amber Gold (voiced by Paget Brewster): A female operative of O.S.I. She is tasked with examining Molotov Cocktease in captivity. When she believes that the Nozzle has detected a foreign object in Molotov's eyepatch, she momentarily takes her eyes off Molotov, allowing Molotov to escape her restraints and disguise herself as Amber using Amber's platinum blonde wig to cover her own shorter natural blonde hair. Amber is in a relationship with Headshot, although their relationship becomes strained when he discovers her blonde hair is a wig and feels she is hiding other things from him. Additionally, she is having an affair with Brock Samson.
- Afterburner (voiced by Doc Hammer): A ninja operative of O.S.I. who wears a complete bodysuit similar to Snake Eyes from G.I. Joe, to hide his burn scars.
- Shuttle Cock: An O.S.I. operative themed after an astronaut who wields a badminton racket as a weapon. He is a double-agent killed by Molotov Cocktease.
- Slap Chop: An O.S.I. martial artist operative resembling Iron Fist from comics and Vince Offer, known for pitching the "Slap Chop" kitchen utensil on infomercials. He is a double-agent killed by Molotov Cocktease.
- Bum Rush: An O.S.I. operative themed after a homeless beggar, who stores his weapons in a shopping cart. He is a double-agent killed by Molotov Cocktease.
- Tank Top: An O.S.I. operative who wears an armored tank top with a tank cannon attached to it. He is a double-agent killed by Molotov Cocktease.
- Snoopy (voiced by John Hodgman): A meek O.S.I. operative who works on the bridge and assists General Gathers.

== Archvillains and henchmen ==
=== The Guild of Calamitous Intent ===
The Guild of Calamitous Intent is the primary antagonist in the series. It functions as an organization of supervillains, akin to a trade union, offering benefits such as health insurance and establishing rules and conduct standards among its members and their adversaries, primarily superheroes and super-scientists. Serving as a stabilizing force in the world of supervillainy, the Guild prevents unchecked chaos by organizing its members into a cohesive force and restricting their actions to Guild-approved targets, thereby curbing total destruction, murder, and mayhem. Initially led by the enigmatic figure known as "The Sovereign" and the Council of Thirteen, the current iteration of the Guild suggests a refuge for missing or presumed deceased rock stars. In Season 6, most of the Council of 13 is eliminated by The Sovereign to solidify control and confront the supernatural supervillain group, The Investors. Following The Sovereign's accidental death at the hands of O.S.I., surviving members, including Dr. Mrs. The Monarch, Dr. Phineas Phage, Dr. Z, Red Mantle, and Dragoon, under Dr. Henry Killinger's guidance, form a new Council of 13, with assistance from the surviving Revenge Society members, after Killinger eradicates the Investors to restore balance between O.S.I. and the Guild. Although Killinger declines the Sovereign role, he bestows control of the Guild to the council. Season six introduces the New York branch of the Guild, comprising the organization's most dangerous supervillains. Notably, the original Guild charter does not stipulate a specific number of council members, and members cannot actively engage in arching their enemies.

The current iteration of the Guild was reportedly established around 1959 by Phantom Limb's grandfather. However, its roots extend back to the late Victorian era, when it operated as a heroic organization under the leadership of Colonel Lloyd Venture, Rusty Venture's grandfather. This earlier incarnation was devoted to safeguarding an enigmatic artifact known as the "ORB." A schism within the organization arose over differing views on the ORB's purpose. Fantomas founded the Guild of Calamitous Intent in 1910, advocating for using the ORB to dominate mankind, while Lloyd established the modern version of the OSI, aiming to utilize the ORB for the betterment of humanity.

==== The Monarch ====
The Monarch voiced by Christopher McCulloch (voiced by Marx St. Cloud for the pilot): Dr. Venture's self-styled nemesis, whose real name is Malcom Fitzcarraldo. He is obsessed with monarch butterflies, which he claims raised him as a child after he survived the plane wreck that killed his parents. While attending State University, he began arching Dr. Venture, though the reasons remain unrevealed (though possibly due to mocking his affinity for butterflies and suspecting him of being a "closet case"). He later worked for various villains and served as Phantom Limb's Shadowman 9 until becoming Monarch and winning over Dr. Girlfriend. Despite frequently portraying himself as Dr. Venture's nemesis, their rivalry exists solely in Monarch's imagination. In reality, Dr. Venture sees him more as a nuisance than a genuine threat, even entrusting his sons to Monarch's care due to his incompetence. He is also Captain Sunshine's unofficial arch-enemy, demonstrating greater ruthlessness by killing Wonder Boy III and sending the hero his charred corpse. Monarch eventually lost his arching privileges against Rusty after being discovered as an unsanctioned Guild villain. However, he regained the right to arch Rusty by invoking the Guild's "prior escalation" clause. In season one's finale, he was wrongfully convicted of murder and imprisoned due to framing by Phantom Limb. After escaping in season two, he rebuilds his criminal enterprise, reuniting with Dr. Girlfriend and eventually marrying her. By the third season, they reside in Phantom Limb's former mansion in the gated community of Malice. In season five, Monarch's Cocoon ship, home, and henchmen are destroyed by Sgt. Hatred, leading him, his wife, and Henchman 21 to relocate to Monarch's abandoned childhood home in Newark, New Jersey. Losing his cocoon and henchmen substantially lowers his Guild ranking, thereby revoking his rights to fight Dr. Venture. In "Faking Miracles", Monarch discovers that his father was Blue Morpho. Assuming his father's hero identity, he and Henchman 21 eliminate New York Guild members harassing Dr. Venture to advance on the waiting list. In season 7, it is hinted that Monarch's mother had an affair with Jonas Venture, making him Dr. Venture's half-brother, a revelation that shocks him. In the film, Ben reveals that he and Dr. Venture are clones of the original Rusty Venture, with Monarch having baboon DNA spliced in to counter premature alopecia, though it results in heightened aggression. He was given to Don Fitzcarraldo by Jonas Venture.

==== Henchman 21 ====
Henchman 21/Gary Fischer, briefly known as S.P.H.I.N.X. Commander and occasionally as the Viceroy (voiced by Doc Hammer): A pop-culture geek who, at the series' outset, serves as a henchman for Monarch, always alongside his closest friend Henchman 24. He authors "Flight of The Monarch", a tell-all that leads to Monarch's incarceration. Following Henchman 24's death, he undergoes intense combat training, emerging with enough strength and martial skill to challenge Brock Samson. Together, he and Samson defeat Monstroso, a common foe. Henchman 21 continues to converse with what he believes is Henchman 24's ghost, though Henchman 24's ghost suggests he may only exist in Henchman 21's mind (a notion both confirmed and refuted in Operation: P.R.O.M.), echoing Rudyard Kipling's "The Man Who Would Be King." In "Operation P.R.O.M.", 21 is invited to join S.P.H.I.N.X., an anti-unlicensed superhero team, where he finds camaraderie and begins to question his loyalty to Monarch and villainy in general. Ultimately, he realizes villainy isn't his path and resigns from Monarch's service. In "From the Ladle to the Grave: The Story of Shallow Gravy", a 2011 Venture Brothers special set after "Operation P.R.O.M.", he is interviewed wearing a S.P.H.I.N.X. uniform with his face obscured, going by the name Viceroy. Following "Operation P.R.O.M.", Gary assumes command of S.P.H.I.N.X., though it is short-lived as original S.P.H.I.N.X. members seize control, prompting O.S.I. to disband the organization. Gary resides in the Venture Compound's backyard after Dr. Venture and Sgt. Hatred destroy S.P.H.I.N.X.'s headquarters, mistakenly believing Gary planted bombs there (in reality planted by Monarch and Dr. Mrs. The Monarch during an infiltration attempt). Later, adopting his "Viceroy" persona, he aids Hank and Dermott in a bank robbery to reach Teddy at Dunwitch Asylum. After assisting Hatred in rescuing Dr. Venture, he leads Monarch's henchmen in overthrowing the moppets and decides to rejoin Monarch, not out of loyalty or to the henchman lifestyle, but because Monarch is his only remaining friend. By Season 7, 21 is Monarch's sole henchman, aiding him in his role as the new Blue Morpho by eliminating Dr. Venture's enemies, though he struggles with guilt as he has never intentionally killed before. Attempting to stop the killings, he captures several archenemies, but one cannibalizes the others. In the season finale, the Guild offers Gary a chance to become a supervillain and leave Monarch, but he declines, reaffirming his loyalty to his best friend and his desire to help him settle his grudge.

==== Henchman 24 ====
Henchman 24 (voiced by Christopher McCulloch) is a tall, thin man with a voice reminiscent of comic Ray Romano and described by 21 in the second season's first episode as resembling Jerry Seinfeld with a unibrow. He served as Shadowman 24 for Phantom Limb simultaneously with Monarch's tenure as Shadowman 9. Monarch promised to promote him to "number 2" in exchange for a favor, a pledge never fulfilled. Henchman 24's powder blue Nissan Stanza serves as the replacement Monarch Mobile after Monarch's lair is destroyed, but it's promptly stolen by a fleeing prostitute. The Stanza mysteriously reappears in Monarch's Cocoon garage, heavily damaged from the Cocoon's crash in the Grand Canyon. Monarch remembers little about 24 besides his voice, likened to Ray Romano's. Formerly a factory worker, 24 confides in Dean that his ex-girlfriend married his father and he aspired to become a cabinet maker. He perishes in an explosion at the end of the season three finale. Throughout season 4, his skull appears as an object with whom #21 converses as before. In "Pinstripes & Poltergeists", #24 seemingly manifests as a ghost haunting #21 due to lack of alternative options. In "Operation: P.R.O.M.", it's revealed that #24 was a figment of 21's grief-stricken imagination. 21's acknowledgment of this allows him to come to terms with 24's death. Though he suspects foul play in 24's death, he accuses Tim Tom and Kevin, enabling Monarch's henchmen to overthrow them.

==== Dr. Mrs. The Monarch ====
Dr. Mrs. The Monarch, née, formerly known as Dr. Sheila Girlfriend (voiced by Doc Hammer): The wife and assistant to Monarch. Throughout much of her tenure as Monarch's second-in-command, she donned Jackie Kennedy's iconic short pink jacket and pillbox hat, echoing the former First Lady's style and accent, typical of Long Island. Her humorously deep voice stems from a past smoking addiction, satirizing the former First Lady's lower-than-usual vocal pitch. Dr. Mrs. Monarch rises to prominence within the Guild, placing strain on her marriage with Monarch—especially when his authority to arch Dr. Venture is revoked due to his perceived low status in comparison to a Level 10 Protagonist like Venture. Monarch believes his wife should expedite his ascent to a higher rank, whereas she prioritizes her role within the Guild, adhering strictly to protocol. Unlike her husband, Dr. Mrs. The Monarch often delineates between her villainous persona and her true self, frequently addressing herself by her birth name, Sheila, and maintaining amicable relationships and collaborations with certain protagonists and their allies when necessary.

==== Tim-Tom and Kevin ====
Tim-Tom and Kevin (voiced by Christopher McCulloch and Doc Hammer, respectively) are achondroplastic dwarves who previously served as Dr. Girlfriend's assistants during her solo career as Lady Au Pair. Despite their surly, foul-mouthed, and seemingly psychotic behavior—readily engaging in ferocious attacks with their matching stilettos with minimal provocation—they maintain a respectful demeanor toward Dr. Girlfriend. However, in her absence, their demeanor shifts markedly, revealing a more aggressive and unstable disposition. Although typically intimidating towards others, they exhibited fear when confronted and threatened by Monarch, particularly when his wife was not present—an occurrence that underscored the only instance they displayed vulnerability. Despite their tendency to bully others, they developed a modicum of respect for 21 following his transformation into General 21.

They are presumed to have died in the destruction of the Cocoon, orchestrated by Sergeant Hatred.

==== Watch and Ward ====
Watch and Ward (voiced by Christopher McCulloch and Doc Hammer respectively): As the communications and operations liaisons for the Guild of Calamitous Intent, Watch and Ward are responsible for interacting with prospective protagonists and antagonists to facilitate appropriate arching assistance. Watch is characterized by a tactical eyepatch covering his left eye and a bald appearance, while Ward sports an eyepatch over his right eye, with hair protruding from beneath his cowl. The duo frequently engage in arguments, often drawing inspiration from real-life conversations between McCulloch and Hammer, such as Ward's irritation when Watch consumes his juice box.

==== Dr. Henry Killinger ====
Dr. Henry Killinger (voiced by Christopher McCulloch) is a highly skilled businessman and negotiator who demonstrates a profound understanding of legal matters, particularly tax law. While he possesses magical abilities, the precise nature and scope of his powers remain ambiguous. Some characters struggle to comprehend him when he speaks due to his complex manner of communication.

Dr. Killinger's notable appearances involve spontaneously offering his services as a strategist, business consultant, and motivational coach to main characters, free of charge, in the episodes "I Know Why The Caged Bird Kills" and "The Doctor Is Sin". In both instances, his intervention leads to a significant improvement in the efficiency of his clients' endeavors. Despite his status as a supervillain capable of ruthlessly dispatching adversaries, Dr. Killinger also exhibits the capacity for forming genuine friendships and performing acts of kindness. He fosters an avuncular relationship with the Venture boys in "The Doctor Is Sin", to the extent that they affectionately refer to him as "Uncle Henry".

Killinger is a spoof of Henry Kissinger, who was a Secretary of State and National Security Advisor under two US Presidents.

==== The Sovereign ====
The Sovereign (voiced by Christopher McCulloch, with an impersonation of David Bowie by James Urbaniak): A mysterious figure who leads the Guild of Calamitous Intent, The Sovereign primarily communicates through telescreens, which distort his face and voice. While he would frequently appear as David Bowie, when departing, The Sovereign would often transform into an eagle and fly away, suggesting that perhaps Bowie possessed magical abilities. However, in "O.S.I. Love You", Monstroso reveals that The Sovereign was in actuality a "down-on-his-luck shapeshifter" who had met the real Bowie in 1972, and had adopted his likeness in public ever since. This detail had been hidden even from high-ranking Guild operatives — after learning of the deception, Watch and Ward are dismayed to realize that their signed albums are worthless forgeries.

In "All this and Gargantua-2", The Sovereign orchestrates the murder of most Council of 13 members and engineers the destruction of Gargantua-2 as part of a larger plan to eliminate the Investors. This greatly alarms the "old guard" of the Guild (i.e. the oldest remaining members of the Council), causing them to contact the O.S.I. in the hopes of stopping him. In exchange for immunity, the Guild members reveal the location of his secret lair; the long-time bitter enemies then team up for an all-out assault. As the Guild and O.S.I. close in on it, The Sovereign activates its self-destruct and flies away. Sovereign is accidentally shot and killed by Headshot after the boat he is aboard experiences turbulence from the explosion.

==== Force Majeure ====
Force Majeure is the original sovereign of the Guild of Calamitous Intent, Force Majeure was an elemental villain and the archenemy of Jonas Venture until he was killed by Sovereign. He was married to Madame Majeure and is hinted to be the biological grandfather of the Venture Brothers.

===== Iggy Pop =====
Iggy Pop (impersonated by Christopher McCulloch) is an American rock musician and one of the Sovereign's henchmen. He possesses the ability to create spheres of energy that explode upon his command, "Pop." After betraying the Sovereign in favor of Phantom Limb, Pop is killed by Sovereign for his treachery.

===== Klaus Nomi =====
Klaus Nomi (impersonated by Christopher McCulloch) is a German singer and one of the Sovereign's henchmen. He possesses the ability to sing in a hypersonic voice, and his bowtie can function as a projectile. After betraying the Sovereign in favor of Phantom Limb, Nomi is killed by Sovereign for his treachery.

===== Eon =====
Eon is Sovereign's bodyguard, who resembles longtime David Bowie collaborator Brian Eno.

==== Monstroso ====
Monstroso (voiced by Christopher McCulloch) is a lawyer with the Mammoth Corporation and a supervillain licensed with the Guild of Calamitous Intent. His size is enormous, with a lap sufficient for Dr. Girlfriend and a brace of four additional revelers. Monstroso is prosperous enough to have employed the bulk of Monarch's men while he was in prison, no doubt due to his lawyer and supervillain vocations. In "The Silent Partners", Monstroso has the Investors kidnap Billy Quizboy, and it is revealed that he is dying of heart failure and requires a transplant from King Gorilla. Billy was chosen because of his skills, and the Investors would return the favor by forging documents signed by Billy to "officially" give him credentials to be legally recognized as a doctor and "immortality" for his recognized fame as a great surgeon because the surgery is so difficult. Billy completes the transplant, and in the post-credits scene, Monstroso appears to be recovering from his surgery, although he appears to be unaware that he is no longer on his boat but actually at the Sphinx headquarters on the Venture compound. However, in "Operation: P.R.O.M.", Monstroso is rescued by Molotov, and it is revealed that he and Molotov are in a romantic relationship. After the limousine, in which he is being rescued by Molotov, falls off a cliff, Brock finds it in the season 5 premiere and finds Monstroso's "body" was a fake, with no trace of Molotov. He and Molotov are eventually captured by O.S.I. in "O.S.I. Love You", but he is killed by the Investors after he reveals too many guild secrets to Brock.

==== Torrid ====
Torrid (voiced by Christopher McCulloch) is the archenemy of the Order of the Triad. He is first assigned as their archenemy in "Fallen Arches" when he kidnaps Triana Orpheus to the Torrid Zone. He possesses fire-based powers. In "Showdown at Cremation Creek", he steals the All-Seeing Orb, prompting The Alchemist and Jefferson Twilight to question the utility of having an archenemy. Torrid's final appearance is when he attempts to open a portal to the Second World, unwittingly getting sucked into it and then summoning an elder god that the Triad are unable to defeat, leaving Orpheus' protege, the Outrider, to save them all.

==== Truckules ====
Truckules (voiced by Christopher McCulloch) is a supervillain with themes of both trucks and Hercules. He was formerly Number One for Dr. Mrs. The Monarch, from whom she learned how to hotwire any vehicle. His upper body resembles that of Optimus Prime's, and is so wide that when he attends Monarch's wedding, he requests two seats.

==== The Intangible Fancy ====
The Intangible Fancy (voiced by Christopher McCulloch) is a supervillain with the ability to become intangible. He attends Dr. Venture's yard sale to make a purchase but becomes embroiled in the ensuing fight. Later, he is questioned by the Council of 13 after attempting to smuggle contraband.

==== The Investors ====
The Investors (Caecius: voiced by Doc Hammer; Skiron: voiced by John Hodgman; Lips: voiced by T. Ryder Smith) are a mysterious group of supervillains introduced in "Pinstripes & Poltergeists" as members of the Guild aligned with Monstroso. They possess seemingly omnipotent abilities, capable of granting the dreams and wishes of individuals through "contracts", albeit at a steep price. Despite being sought after by both O.S.I. and the reformed S.P.H.I.N.X., they evade capture.

In "O.S.I. Love You", they disguise themselves as O.S.I. Mister level operatives, including Mister Frost (voiced by Christopher McCulloch), Mister Sample (voiced by Dana Snyder), and Mister Yourname (voiced by Brendon Small), the latter of whom has not undergone proper induction. Their goal is to interrogate individuals regarding the whereabouts of Monstroso and Molotov Cocktease. During Brock's interrogation, they kill Monstroso, successfully deceiving General Gathers until the real Mister operatives arrive.

During the opening of Gargantua-2, they aim to "collect" what they offered to JJ Venture by destroying the station. Concurrently, Sovereign plans to attack the station to eliminate the Investors before they demand their due from him. With assistance from Phantom Limb, they sabotage the station, escape Sovereign, and confront Dr. Henry Killinger on Meteor Majeure, where they are killed in battle.

==== Augustus St. Cloud ====
Augustus St. Cloud (voiced by Christopher McCulloch, originally James Urbaniak) is the affluent former rival of Billy from their quiz show days, both being collectors of sci-fi and Rusty Venture memorabilia. He initially appears at Dr. Venture's tag sale, enduring Baron Ünderbheit's attacks due to Monarch's intervention. Later, he joins the ranks of supervillains, despite not being an official Guild member yet.

After making a substantial donation to the Guild's Widows and Orphans charity, he gains induction into the Guild and the privilege to choose from a pool of archnemeses. He insists on selecting Billy Quizboy, and Watch and Ward comply after another generous donation. St. Cloud's feud with Billy escalates when they must retrieve items he purchased from Dr. Venture to fund the Palaemon Project, uncovering St. Cloud's Asian albino henchman, "Pi Wai." Despite refusing to consume $1 worth of pennies, the exact value Billy outbid St. Cloud in an eBay auction years earlier, Billy triumphs over St. Cloud in a trivia contest once again. He reclaims Venture's hovercraft, essential for handling the Palaemon Project mutants, and H.E.L.P.er, who had been sold to St. Cloud.

St. Cloud is known for his short and stout stature, deadpan voice, round dark glasses, and assortment of ginger pageboy-style wigs. His immense wealth and somewhat petulant demeanor lead him to employ monetary persuasion or acquisitions to achieve his objectives.

=== The Council of Thirteen ===
The governing body of the Guild of Calamitous Intent consists of the following known members:

==== Council of the Sovereign ====
- Councilman 1: Vendata (voiced by Doc Hammer): A cyborg created by Dr. Jonas Venture Sr. to house the consciousness and memories of human beings, specifically his friend Blue Morpho, who perished in a plane crash. Originally dubbed "Venturion", he malfunctioned and attempted to strangle young Rusty, prompting his destruction by Kano. This event profoundly affected both characters: Rusty experiences recurring nightmares, while Kano, devastated by the necessity of killing his former partner, swore eternal silence. Dr. Z salvaged Vendata's remains, reprogramming him into a supervillain named "Vendata." As a villain, he was part of a gang of young supervillains who attempted an unauthorized arch of Jonas aboard Gargantua-1. During a confrontation with Jonas, Vendata deliberately opened the station's bay doors, leading to the Movie Night Massacre. The Sovereign seemingly rewarded him by granting him the top seat on the council. O.S.I. orchestrated a sting operation, with Ghost Robot acting as an informant to extract information on the Council of Thirteen from Vendata, but Brock Samson severely damaged Ghost Robot. This attack triggers Vendata's recall of his original memories as the Blue Morpho. He confronts Jonas at Ventech Tower in New York City, assuming his Blue Morpho identity. Jonas, via the ProBLEM machine, reveals his intention to use Vendata/Venturion as a temporary vessel for his consciousness while Rusty clones a new body for Jonas, erasing Blue Morpho's consciousness and memories in the process. Their confrontation leads to their apparent death when their virtual selves destroy their physical bodies inside the ProBLEM machine.
- Councilman 2: Wild Fop (voiced by Christopher McCulloch): A Restoration-themed supervillain introduced in an informational video provided to Dr. Orpheus upon his approval as a supervillain. He is killed by his own dogs in "All This and Gargantua 2".
- Councilman 3: Red Mantle (voiced by Doc Hammer): A magic-wielding supervillain with elemental powers, who is accompanied by Dragoon, attached to his neck. Together, they are referred to as "Red Dragoon" in season 6. Red Mantle is implied to be an elderly version of Buddy Holly, abducted by the Guild decades earlier.
- Councilman 4: Boggles, the Clue Clown: A clown-themed supervillain and former nemesis of Captain Sunshine. He is based on the Joker and the Riddler, with Dragoon describing his jokes as tedious and his riddles as obvious. Boggles is discovered deceased from a heart attack, possibly linked to his identity being exposed to Brock by Monstroso. He is replaced by Dr. Phineas Phage.
  - Dr. Phineas Phage (voiced by Bill Hader in season 4, James Adomian in seasons 5, 6, and 7): A cybernetic villain with a bacteriophage theme who leads a group of henchmen known as the "Pro-Teens." He debuts in "Pomp & Circuitry" as the Guild-appointed archenemy to Richard Impossible. Encountering Phantom Limb's altercation with Professor Impossible, Phage is assaulted by the fleeing villain but survives to notify the Guild. He makes a cameo appearance in "Any Which Way But Zeus", among the other villains and heroes whose followers were abducted. Following Boggles the Clue Clown's funeral in the season 5 episode "Bot Seeks Bot", Phage is appointed by the Sovereign as the new Councilman #4. To secure this position, he memorizes the entire book of Guild law for his exam but is ultimately outsmarted by Dr. Mrs. The Monarch in a debate on the subject. In "All This and Gargantua 2", he is one of the only Council members to survive, escaping with Dr. Mrs. The Monarch but eventually parting ways with her after leaving Guild headquarters. Upon the Guild's reformation, Phage is reinstated as a Councilman. However, he is absent from the current council members in "The Terminus Mandate", and it is later revealed that he is in a coma in "The Saphrax Protocol" due to injuries sustained when his cybernetic body caused a malfunction in the teleporter he was using.
- Councilman 5: Dr. Z: See below.
- Councilman 6: Monseñor (voiced by Larry Murphy): A priest and villain with a lucha libre theme. He delivers Boggles' eulogy at his funeral but is later killed by poison gas in "All This and Gargantua 2".
- Councilman 7: Don Hell (voiced by Christopher McCulloch): A magic-wielding supervillain who owns a nightclub for other supervillains called Don Hell's. Upon discovering Dr. Venture and Billy Quizboy in his establishment, he attempts to entertain his patrons by torturing them until Dr. Mrs. The Monarch reveals it violates Guild bylaws to harm another member's archenemy without approval. Hell is loosely based on real-life New York City club promoter Don Hill. In "All This and Gargantua 2", Hell is killed after drinking acid.
- Councilman 8: Dragoon (voiced by Christopher McCulloch): A dragoon-themed supervillain whose head has been sewn onto the body of Red Mantle. He is highly critical of fellow supervillains and believes all magic is abominable. Dragoon is gradually losing his faculties, mistakenly believing himself to be from the 16th century and confusing real events with those from Wacky Races. Implied to be an elderly Big Bopper, abducted by the Guild decades earlier.
- Councilman 9: Steppenwolf (voiced by Christopher McCulloch): A werewolf-themed supervillain. He owns a car similar to that owned by the family in The Munsters. Killed by a car bomb in "All This and Gargantua 2".
- Councilman 10: An insect-themed armored supervillain who was killed by a car bomb in "All This and Gargantua 2". The Art of the Venture Bros book mentions that the creators never settled on a name for this character but the name Omocha Bug may have been used in an early script.
- Councilman 11: Mommy Longlegs (voiced by Paget Brewster): The only currently female member of the Council of Thirteen, she does not attend the congratulatory party for Phage as her grandchildren are coming to town for the weekend. Her silhouette resembles that of background character Mommy Longlegs, a spider-themed supervillainess, one among the many kidnapped by Zeus and Zero in "Any Which Way But Zeus". Killed by gunshots fired by a Guild murderbot while making her escape from the Sovereign's headquarters in "All This and Gargantua-2".
- Councilman 12: The Nerve (voiced by Christopher McCulloch): A supervillain who is a sentient nervous system with no body, floating in a transparent humanoid suit. Found dead in a dumpster in "All This and Gargantua 2".
- Councilman 13: The Sovereign

==== Wide Wale ====
Wide Wale (voiced by Hal Lublin) is the leader of the New York branch of the Guild. He is brought in to help shore up support for the Guild and the council after the events of Gargantua-2. He agrees to join only if he is given the arching rights to Dr. Venture. His real name is Chester Ong, and he is the younger brother of Doctor Dugong, a scientist whom Monarch seemingly killed. As a result of a laboratory accident, he has physical aspects of whales as part of his biology; these traits were inherited by his daughter Sirena. In Season 7, he forbids his daughter from seeing Hank Venture since he doesn't approve of him. He later captures Monarch and tells him that he plans to kill him out of revenge for his brother's death. He also tasks Hank with killing him, but he refuses, and just when Wide Wale is about to do it, Dr. Mrs. The Monarch and Red Death appear with Dr. Dugong, who grew a new head, allowing him to survive Monarch's attempt on his life before he went into hiding, provided by the OSI. Wide Wale is then faced with dealing with his daughter and brother, who are angry that he didn't tell them about Dugong. In "The Terminus Mandate", he resigns from his seat on the council, as he is unable to let go of his personal vendettas, though he remains an ally to them.

==== Red Death ====
Red Death (voiced by Clancy Brown) is a skinless red supervillain similar to the Red Skull. Despite his terrifying visage and reputation, he is actually a kind and loving husband and father. However, when arching or in times of anger or other elevated emotion, he slips into an evil persona with no hesitation to kill. In Season 7, it is revealed that Red Death was a member of a gang of young Guild villains at the beginning of his career in the 1980s.

==== Original members ====
- Col. Lloyd Venture (August 24, 1800s - November 15, 1940) (voiced by Christopher McCulloch): Grandfather of Dr. Jonas Venture Sr., great-grandfather to Dr. Thaddeus "Rusty" Venture and Dr. Jonas Venture Jr., and great-great-grandfather to Hank and Dean. Col. Venture was the leader of the Guild, a group set up to protect the Orb from falling into the wrong hands.
- Eugen Sandow (voiced by Paul Boocock): Famed German bodybuilder who served as Col. Venture's O.S.I.-appointed bodyguard. In the flashbacks during the episode "Orb", he intimates in his phonograph diaries that he killed Col. Venture for attempting to discover the secrets of the Orb, the true purpose of O.S.I.'s watch over the Venture family. However, in "The Revenge Society", it is revealed that he only broke the Orb and both he and Col. Venture hid this from their descendants and later bodyguards.
- Aleister Crowley (voiced by Steven Rattazzi): Famed British occultist who sought to use the Orb for his own ends, believing that he had a right to it as the Orb's most recent owner. However, he was later forcibly ejected from the Guild's zeppelin for doing so.
- Fantômas (voiced by Christopher McCulloch): Famed French thief and ancestor of Phantom Limb who wants to use the Orb to rule the world. He is later kicked out of the Guild and forms his own Guild of Calamitous Intent by recruiting Buddy Holly and the Big Bopper, attempting to convince them that the sousaphone was an instrument that belonged in rock music.
- Oscar Wilde (voiced by James Urbaniak): Famed Irish poet who, upon Fantômas' suggestion to use the Orb for evil, denounces that the Guild should not be a "Guild of Calamitous Intent."
- Samuel Clemens (voiced by Paul Boocock): Famed American author and member of the original Guild who alerts fellow members that they are being chased by Nicola Tesla and his cadre of Avon Ladies.

==== Other members ====
- Brick Frog: A villain clad in a frog costume whose "superpower" involves hurling bricks stored in a satchel.
- Scare Bear: An enigmatic villain always garbed in a blood-stained bear costume, brandishing a knife. As it never communicates, its gender remains unknown. It made its debut as an applicant to the Revenge Society in "Bright Lights, Dean City", startling the leadership by stealthily entering Professor Impossible's office. Later, it joined the Guild, making sporadic background appearances before assuming a more significant role in "The Forecast Manufacturer." In this episode, it rescues an injured Hank from a blizzard, transporting him to Dean's dorm, where Sirena is revealed to be cheating on Hank with Dean. How it was aware of Sirena's relationship with Hank and her presence at the dorm with Dean remains a mystery.
- Flying Squid (voiced by Bill Hader): A supervillain with a squid motif, who first identifies the costume Shoreleave is wearing in the bar as belonging to the missing Guild member, Sri Lankan Devil Bird. He subsequently rescues Dr. Venture from Don Hell by coordinating with Monarch and Dr. Mrs. The Monarch to utilize guild law for intervention.
- Vespertina (voiced by Paget Brewster): A supervillainess with a floral theme, who makes advances towards Shoreleave while he is dressed as Red-Throated Loon, but is put off by his flamboyance.
- Sri Lankan Devil Bird: A four-armed supervillain who endeavors to arch Dr. Venture in "The Doctor Is Sin." Brock dispatches him quickly. Later, Shoreleave utilizes his costume, under the alias "Red-Throated Loon", to infiltrate Don Hell's nightclub, but Flying Squid recognizes it as belonging to his comrade.
- Sunsational (voiced by Doc Hammer): A supervillain with a theme inspired by the Solar System, who leads a group of henchmen, each representing one of the planets, with Sunsational himself embodying the Sun.
- Galacticon: A robotic supervillain reminiscent of Galactus. O.S.I. enlists Ghost Robot to impersonate Galacticon for a date with Vendata. Don Hell mentions that the genuine Galacticon frequents his club to find new clients, expressing a preference for bears. The actual Galacticon later arrives at the club, disrupting O.S.I.'s plans.
- Haranguetan (voiced by Steven Rattazzi): A savage supervillain who favors hand-to-hand combat. He is defeated by Warriana after injuring Sgt. Hatred and quarreling with Brock. Later, he attempts to arch Dr. Venture again but inadvertently becomes a test subject for Venture's "God Gas." This gas triggers a violent hallucination where he perceives Venture and Billy as demonic figures. While attacking Billy, he is confronted by Monarch and 21 in their Blue Morpho and Kano personas; 21 rescues Billy and knocks Haranguetan into a pit, resulting in his death.
- Battleaxe (voiced by Barbara Rosenblat): The widow of Haranguetan, hailing from Ireland, and a formidable supervillain in her own right. She owns and operates a pub. Upon learning of her husband's death from Dr. Mrs. The Monarch, she reacts emotionally and dons her villain attire and makeup to retrieve his vehicle, the Haranguetank, from impound. After accomplishing this task, she becomes intoxicated and sets off to confront Dr. Venture, whom she mistakenly believes to be the Blue Morpho. However, she accidentally collides with Think Tank and plunges into the same pit where Haranguetan met his end. Although presumed deceased alongside Think Tank, she later resurfaces and resumes management of her pub.
- Copy-Cat (voiced by Toby Huss): A supervillain based in New York with the ability to create duplicates of himself. He is suave and flirtatious, showing no regard for the marital status of his romantic interests. At Wide Wale's party, he tries to charm Dr. Mrs. The Monarch and, using his powers along with Monarch's pilfered costume, frames him for illegally targeting Dr. Venture. Despite failing in his seduction attempt, he succeeds in exacerbating the discord between her and Monarch. Although not officially confirmed, a similarly appearing individual appears in "All This and Gargantua-2" as the lounge singer promoted for Gargantua-2's casino. He is visually inspired by Dean Martin and his speech pattern, while his voice is an impression of Frank Sinatra.
- Dr. Nidaba/Think Tank (voiced by Jeffrey Wright): A brilliant supervillain who also serves as a philosophy professor in his civilian guise. Both Dean Venture and Brown Widow attend his classes. Upon receiving authorization to arch Dr. Venture, he quickly discerns that Dean's academic performance is suffering due to his domestic situation. He advises Dean to distance himself from his home life, expressing a desire not to lose his top student. Later, clad in a purple tank-shaped suit of armor with various abilities—including wall-crawling, barrier projection, and laser projectiles—he confronts Venture. However, his strategy of challenging Venture to a game of chess fails when Venture reveals he doesn't play the game. Dr. Nidaba engages Brock in combat and gains the upper hand momentarily until Warriana—whom he shares a negative history with—intervenes and assists Brock in destroying his armor. Subsequently, he sustains severe injuries when struck by Battleaxe in the Haranguetank. Although he is later revealed to be alive, he remains in a coma in "The High Cost of Loathing." His hovering tank "chair" and disproportionately large head likely pay homage to the Marvel Comics supervillain MODOK.
- The Doom Factory: An avant-garde group of supervillains inspired by Andy Warhol and the Warhol Superstars, as well as the Legion of Doom. Their modus operandi involves throwing extravagant parties at the residences of their archenemies while covertly pilfering all of their possessions. Situated beneath the Gowanus Canal in Brooklyn, their headquarters is a flying saucer. However, Monarch detonates their headquarters in midair after they complete their burglary of Dr. Venture, resulting in the simultaneous death of all members.
  - Wes Warhammer (voiced by Chris McCulloch): The leader of the Doom Factory, modeled after Andy Warhol and Lex Luthor.
  - Frigid: Named after Factory member Brigid Berlin, this character is both physically modeled after and possesses the freezing abilities of Captain Cold.
  - Eenie-Meanie: A diminutive, fairy-like villainess, whose name pays homage to Factory member Edie Sedgwick.
  - Serpentine: Named in reference to Factory member Ondine, this character possesses the loquacity of Riddler.
  - Hard Candy: Named after Factory member Candy Darling, this character appears to be a fusion of two distinct characters: while her skin resembles the angular, multi-faceted appearance of Bizarro, her facial features strongly resemble those of the Joker (she also consistently cracks jokes).
  - She-Hemoth: Named in reference to Holly Woodlawn in terms of appearance, this character's ability to increase in size and her overall appearance are reminiscent of Giganta.
  - Gerard the Gorilla: Named after Factory member Gerard Malanga, this character possesses no superpowers in the episode, but physically resembles Gorilla Grodd.
  - Trashenstein: Named in reference to Factory member Joe Dallesandro, this character is a combination of the titles of his most famous movies, Flesh for Frankenstein and Trash. While his mindless rage and monosyllabic grunting resemble Solomon Grundy, his physical appearance is that of Frankenstein's Monster.
  - Black Maria: Named in reference to Factory member Paul Morrissey, this character's appearance closely resembles that of the longtime DC Comics supervillain and Legion of Doom member Black Manta, blended with features of a Polaroid Polavision film camera.
  - Ultra Violent: Named after Factory member Ultra Violet, this character physically resembles and exhibits the powers of Star Sapphire.
  - Billy Maim: Named after Factory member Billy Name, this character, while not physically resembling any Legion of Doom member, possesses retractable claws reminiscent of LoD mainstay Cheetah.

=== The Revenge Society ===
A newly formed, independent organization of villains primarily established to counter the Guild of Calamitous Intent. Consequently, several of its members have had negative encounters with the Guild in the past. The society's founder is Phantom Limb, who initially conceived it as his "team" to acquire the ORB for use against the Guild. However, this version of the Revenge Society consisted solely of Phantom Limb himself, along with inanimate objects he believed to be real individuals: a coffee mug named Wisdom, a toaster named Chuck, and a shoe called Lady Nightshade. After escaping Guild custody, Phantom Limb joined forces with Richard Impossible to establish the current Revenge Society. This iteration has swiftly achieved success in the realm of villainy, although they failed to eliminate Dr. Venture twice in "Bright Lights, Dean City." The group has since been effectively disbanded as of "All This and Gargantua-2."

- The Phantom Limb (Hamilton G. Fantomos) (voiced by James Urbaniak): A villain characterized by his invisible arms and legs. Despite his cunning and ruthlessness, he exhibits a refined cultural taste, as evidenced by his appreciation for Persian rugs and fine cheeses. However, he often comes across as pretentious and occasionally oblivious to the consequences of his actions, seemingly too engrossed in his persona to fully comprehend his deeds. Formerly a professor at the same state college attended by many characters in the show, he was disowned by his family of adventurers due to his tiny, deformed limbs. When Billy Quizboy was sent by O.S.I. to spy on him, Fantomos appointed Billy as his lab assistant, believing him to possess a brilliant mind. During an experiment aimed at normalizing his limbs, a malfunction occurred, resulting in them not only reaching normal size but also becoming invisible and granting him the ability to kill with a mere touch. He was once romantically involved with Dr. Girlfriend, but she ultimately left him for Monarch due to his controlling and possessive nature.
- Professor Richard Impossible (voiced by Stephen Colbert in seasons 1, 2, and "All This and Gargantua-2", Peter McCulloch in "The Terrible Secret of Turtle Bay", Christopher McCulloch in season 3, and Bill Hader in season 4): The founder of Impossible Industries, a prominent government contractor, and former professor to Dr. Venture, Mr. White, Billy Quizboy, and Dean Venture, whom he hired as an intern. He holds science and the pursuit of knowledge in high esteem, often to the point of appearing ruthlessly homicidal or simply out of touch, causing tension with his wife, Sally. Impossible and his associates are a parody of the Fantastic Four: following an experiment with cosmic radiation, each gained peculiar abilities. Richard, akin to Mister Fantastic, can stretch his body like rubber, occasionally using this power to appear taller. The other members of his family possess parodies of the other Fantastic Four members' powers. In a state of disarray and depression, Richard Impossible is depicted in "Pomp & Circuitry" after enduring a series of hardships, including his wife leaving him for JJ Venture, being recruited by Phantom Limb for revenge against the Guild, and ultimately forming a new Guild with Phantom Limb. Assuming the supervillain persona of Professor Incorrigible, he later abandons this identity upon realizing his son needs him to be a father, departing Gargantua-2 with his ex-wife and son.
- Baron Werner Ünderbheit (voiced by T. Ryder Smith): A prominent member of the Guild of Calamitous Intent and former oppressive ruler of Ünderland. He sports a prosthetic metal jaw and speaks with a thick, pseudo-German accent. Initially blaming Dr. Venture for the loss of his jaw, it is later revealed that Monarch was actually responsible for the explosion that disfigured Ünderbheit. Following his ousting, he is depicted in "Pomp and Circuitry" begging for money outside Impossible Industries, and in a post-credits scene, he seeks to join Phantom Limb and Professor Impossible's new Guild. He is presumed deceased following the explosion of Gargantua-2.
  - Manservant (voiced by Christopher McCulloch): Baron Ünderbheit's devoted servant, gifted to him on his college birthday. Manservant's loyalty to Ünderbheit borders on the robotic; he communicates in a zombie-like monotone and often appears vacant-eyed. He is shown alongside Baron Ünderbheit in "Pomp and Circuitry", panhandling outside Impossible Industries, and accompanies him in his attempt to join Phantom Limb and Impossible's new Guild. In "Bright Lights, Dean City", he briefly appears with the Revenge Society in a new costume before Ünderbheit, demonstrating his loyalty to the Society, fatally breaks his neck.
- Fat Chance (voiced by Christopher McCulloch): A supervillain recruited into the Revenge Society to fill missing archetypical positions. Following a scientific mishap, Fat Chance's duodenum now harbors a portal to another dimension, allowing him to summon objects that invariably aid him.
- Lyndon Bee (voiced by Christopher McCulloch) and Ladyhawk Johnson (voiced by Mia Barron): A duo of supervillains enlisted into the Revenge Society. By day, Lyndon Bee assumes the form of a bee, while at night, Ladyhawk transforms into a hawk. They are cursed never to be together except during a solar eclipse.
- Radical Left (voiced by Christopher McCulloch): A supervillain incarcerated at Dunwitch Asylum, with half of his body severely disfigured. Drawing inspiration from the DC comics character Two-Face, his persona is divided between radical anarchist ideologies and peaceful inclinations more reminiscent of a typical 1950s suburbanite. He later joins the Revenge Society and subsequently the New Council, as depicted in "All This and Gargantua-2." Season 7 unveils that Radical Left absorbed his nemesis Right Wing in a prior confrontation, resulting in each sharing one half of a complete body, with occasional games deciding who controls their bodily actions.
- Zero (Scott Hall) (voiced by Christopher McCulloch): Initially known as Number One within Monarch's ranks, he is beaten by Brock Samson during a stealth operation on Spider-Skull Island due to his adherence to clichés while attempting sabotage, capturing Brock's attention. Renaming himself Zero, he later collaborates with the original Captain Sunshine to abduct sidekicks worldwide and pit them against each other in battle, only to be thwarted by a rebellion led by Gary. Joining the Revenge Society in their assault on Gargantua-2, his genre blindness ultimately leads to his death. Obsessed with killing Brock, he spends crucial moments monologuing, allowing Brock to snap his neck.

=== Ünderland ===
Ünderland is a micronation situated near Michigan. Formerly under the dictatorship of Baron Werner Ünderbheit, the nation enforced mandatory conscription for all men aged 18 and compulsory euthanasia at 40. Notably, Ünderland lacked prisons, with all crimes punishable by death. However, following the events of "Love Bheits", Ünderbheit is ousted, leading to Ünderland's transition to a democracy.

- Girl Hitler (voiced by Mia Barron): Previously one of Baron Ünderbheit's senior advisers, she, along with Catclops and Manic 8-ball, was "executed" for betraying Ünderbheit's trust, though all three survived. With Ünderbheit no longer in power, she assumes the presidency of Ünderland.
- Catclops (voiced by James Urbaniak): A cyclops adorned with a cat's visage and a tail extending from the back of his head. Following their "execution" by tiger-bombs, he and Girl Hitler sought refuge underground, leading a somewhat ineffective band of freedom fighters. With Ünderland liberated, he proposed to Girl Hitler.
- Manic 8-ball (unvoiced): A human possessing the abilities of a Magic 8 Ball. Executed by Baron Ünderbheit for treason alongside Catclops and Girl Hitler, he miraculously survived the tiger attack and subsequent explosion. However, he was apprehended and held captive by Ünderbheit, who utilized his eight-ball power for guidance. Devoid of a mouth, he communicates solely through the yes or no messages displayed on his chest.
- Eunuchs (voiced by Christopher McCulloch and James Urbaniak): A duo of homosexuals employed by Baron Ünderbheit to groom Dawn (Dean Venture) for the Baron's nuptials. The slender member of the pair was initially a college student from Detroit who ventured abroad to Ünderland for a semester, only to be captured and pressed into service as a court eunuch. Upon uncovering Dean's true gender, he opts to withhold the revelation to humiliate Ünderbheit.

=== Imprisoned villains ===
- King Gorilla (voiced by Christopher McCulloch): A homosexual gorilla with the ability to speak, who forged a friendship with Monarch while incarcerated. Once a member of the Guild of Calamitous Intent, King Gorilla's membership was revoked after he was imprisoned for the violent murder and rape of Mötley Crüe lead singer Vince Neil during a reality TV program. This high-profile crime led to the Guild disavowing King Gorilla, embittering him and fostering a cynical attitude towards the organization. Despite kidnapping and attempting to assault Monarch, he ultimately assists in the latter's escape from prison, moved by Monarch's pursuit to regain Dr. Girlfriend's affection. Initially believed to have been killed off-screen by Phantom Limb, it was later revealed on Christopher McCulloch's LiveJournal that King Gorilla was slated to return, liberated from prison, in the latter half of the fourth season.
- Mr. Monday (voiced by Christopher McCulloch): An upper-class villain characterized by his monocle and an unusual fixation on Mondays. When Monarch plans his escape for that night, Mr. Monday insists on postponing, asking, "Can't we wait until Monday?" and frequently exclaims phrases such as "Mondaylicious!" Released from prison by Phantom Limb, he is killed by Phantom Limb in "Showdown at Cremation Creek (Part I)".
- Tigeriffic (voiced by Paul Boocock): A former supervillain whose tiger suit granted him superhuman strength and tiger-like abilities.
- White Noise (voiced by Brendon Small): A smoking, racist former television repairman, White Noise underwent a transformation while repairing a TV still connected to a live socket. He expresses concern about Monarch's criminal organization being "racially mixed", fearing the dilution of his purportedly pure white blood. In response, Monarch questions the validity of his claim, questioning whether he even possesses blood and how he knows he's truly white. Speaking with a Southern dialect, White Noise was tasked with aiding in Monarch's escape by eliminating the guards, alongside Dr. Septapus. White Noise is later shot and killed by Phantom Limb on his private grounds.
- Dr. Septapus (voiced by Christopher McCulloch): Another of Monarch's criminal associates during his incarceration, Dr. Septapus possesses seven limbs, including four arms on his sides, one chest arm, and two legs. Like White Noise, he was intended to assist in Monarch's escape by dispatching the guards. However, upon release from prison, he becomes a target for Phantom Limb's hunt on his private property. Dr. Septapus meets his end when shot down from a tree and subsequently shot on the ground.
- Tiny Joseph (voiced by Doc Hammer): Initially seen as one of Monarch's henchmen in a dream sequence within "A Very Venture Christmas", Tiny Joseph later emerges as Monarch's cellmate. Standing just a few inches tall, he engraves a message onto a microdot, intended to be conveyed by a butterfly to Monarch. Additionally, he serves as a projectile in Monarch's makeshift prison dart gun.
- Teddy (voiced by Christopher McCulloch): A criminally insane supervillain bearing severe burns, Teddy once provided the voice for a Teddy Ruxpin-like toy. Incarcerated in Dunwitch Asylum for the Criminally Insane after embracing Ronald Reagan too vigorously, Teddy's toy is utilized by the boys and Hatred to deceive their father into believing he's been abducted by Zeus in "Any Which Way but Zeus". Subsequently, Hank and Dermott employ the same toy to maintain the illusion of conversation with Teddy in "Momma's Boys", employing a prepaid cellphone to keep their father occupied while they slip away. Unwittingly drawn into Myra Brandish's coup attempt, Teddy eventually escapes confinement, rescuing Dr. Venture and Sgt. Hatred from certain peril when their vehicle careens into a ravine en route to "Bygolly Gulch".
- Cuckoo Clocker (voiced by Christopher McCulloch): A supervillain incarcerated at Dunwitch Asylum, sporting a door resembling a cuckoo clock embedded in his head.
- Big Time: A supervillain also detained at Dunwitch Asylum, distinguished by a clock face tattoo adorning his visage, with his mustache fashioned to resemble two clock hands. Both he and Myra Brandish harbor the belief that he possesses temporal manipulation abilities.
- Maybe Man (voiced by Christopher McCulloch): A supervillain confined at Dunwitch Asylum, whom Myra Brandish implores to facilitate Dean's placement within her womb for birth, to which he cryptically responds with "maybe".

=== Fraternity of Torment ===
The Fraternity of Torment stands as one of the few supervillain collectives outside the Guild of Calamitous Intent. Comprising mostly marginalized individuals ostracized by society due to various physical deformities, they frequently clashed with Team Venture during the 1960s. However, Jonas and his team often appeared to taunt and bully them for amusement rather than engage them out of a sense of justice. Although the original group's remnants surface in "Now Museum, Now You Don't", they still maintain a presence in the realm of organized supervillainy alongside the "Peril Partnership".

- Scaramantula (voiced by Toby Huss): An Italian supervillain with a spider motif inspired by the James Bond antagonist Scaramanga. Sporting eight fingers on his right hand and a partial spider mask adorning his face, complete with eyebrows and mustache resembling eight legs, he once owned Spider Skull Island. However, an ill-fated attempt to kidnap Rusty Venture led to their defeat by Team Venture. Dr. Venture, infiltrating the group as "Dr. Fanadragon", revealed his true identity, resulting in the Fraternity's downfall. Scaramantula managed to escape and initiated a failed self-destruct sequence, leading to Spider Skull Island's absorption into Venture Industries. Retiring from villainy, Scaramantula maintains peak physical condition from exercising on the island's escape path. Witnessing the desecration of his former home, he aids Brainulo in seeking revenge and narrowly avoids being killed in the self-destruct sequence.
- Brainulo (voiced by Christopher McCulloch): A supervillain hailing from a millennium in the future, Brainulo purportedly found himself stranded in the year 1969 after Dr. Jonas Venture destroyed his means of returning. Utilizing his superior intellect and mental abilities, he commandeered a colossal robot dubbed Futuro. Amidst the assault on Spider Skull Island, Brainulo seized control of Futuro, only to be toppled by the Humongoloid. In the present era, Brainulo is revealed to be a paraplegic, feigning senility as part of a vendetta against Dr. Venture and his progeny. Exploiting the fears and vulnerabilities of attendees at the Jonas Venture Museum's inauguration, he seeks to incite chaos. However, his bid fails, and in a final effort to wrest control of Futuro, he inadvertently shorts his own brain, succumbing to genuine senility. Subsequently, he reappears in the lobby of Impossible Industries during "Bright Lights, Dean City", ostensibly as an applicant to the Revenge Society. Yet, given his motionless, vacant demeanor, it is uncertain whether he intentionally sought entry or simply wandered in.
- Manotaur: A supervillain endowed with superhuman strength, Manotaur faced ostracism due to his formidable size. In a flashback during "Shadowman 9: In the Cradle of Destiny", Monarch falsely claimed to be "Manotaur" to evade reprisal from Phantom Limb after his dalliance with Dr. Girlfriend. However, it is ultimately revealed that Manotaur exists, having retired to a position with the MTA, where he is killed by Phantom Limb.

=== Peril Partnership ===
The Peril Partnership is a supervillain coalition headquartered in Toronto, serving as one of several rival factions to the Guild of Calamitous Intent. Members of this organization can be identified by the letters 'PP' on their attire. In season 7, it is unveiled that the Peril Partnership has infiltrated the Guild. However, this revelation exposes a splinter faction comprising some American members of the Peril Partnership, seeking to instigate a conflict between the Guild and their organization, with the aim of usurping control as the preeminent supervillain consortium.

- Tiger Shark (voiced by Christopher McCulloch): A supervillain with a shark motif, Tiger Shark stands as the sole documented member of the Peril Partnership. He makes an appearance in "Any Which Way But Zeus", engaging in a brainstorming session to devise strategies for locating the henchmen and sidekicks who have been abducted. During the encounter, Tiger Shark recounts a past encounter with Brock Samson, highlighting a personal grudge stemming from discovering Brock in a compromising situation with his wife. Despite Brock's lackluster apology, he hints at the possibility of deception on the part of Tiger Shark's spouse.
- The Creep (voiced by James Adomian): Leading the Peril Partnership's splinter faction, The Creep formerly served as an O.S.I agent under the alias Mission Creep. Discharged after an incident where he mistakenly eliminated a Boy Scout troop, he rejected the Guild due to its stringent regulations. Joining the Peril Partnership didn't alleviate his discontent either. Eventually, he formed a dissident group of likeminded villains, aiming to instigate conflict between the Guild and the Partnership. The Creep embarked on a spree, targeting Guild members for sport and acquiring their signature tools to weaponize against the O.S.I. Pursued by Monarch and 21 on orders from both the Guild and O.S.I, he engages them in a lethal game of Lawn Darts, dying after being distracted by the sudden appearance of Dr. Venture and Billy Quizboy from Grover Cleveland's Presidential time machine.
- Blind Rage (voiced by Brendon Small): A blind villain with a pro wrestling motif, Blind Rage operates within the Peril Partnership's splinter cell. Tasked with blackmailing the Council of Thirteen, he faces rejection. Later, he encounters Red Death, who renders him unconscious and binds him to subway tracks, leaving him at the mercy of an approaching train. Whether he survives the ordeal remains undisclosed.

=== S.P.H.I.N.X. ===
Originally a terrorist organization that served as the primary adversary of the O.S.I. 20 years ago until its defeat in the Pyramid Wars of 1987. The conflict erupted when S.P.H.I.N.X. seemingly took credit for the Movie Night Massacre on Gargantua-1, resulting in the death of Jonas Venture Sr. and numerous others. However, it was later revealed that the Sovereign had framed S.P.H.I.N.X. using the form of S.P.H.I.N.X. Commander. Disillusioned with the O.S.I.'s bureaucracy, several of its members decided to adopt the S.P.H.I.N.X. identity, along with their surplus equipment, to combat rogue supervillains. By the end of season 4 and the start of season 5, former O.S.I. agents who had joined S.P.H.I.N.X. were reinstated into the O.S.I., leaving Henchman 21 as the sole remaining S.P.H.I.N.X. operative. Gary attempts to recruit new members but inadvertently reunites the original S.P.H.I.N.X. members. Aware that their loyalty chips will soon dissolve, resulting in their death, they prepare for a final suicide attack against the O.S.I. S.P.H.I.N.X.'s rented headquarters within the Venture compound is destroyed in the season 5 episode "S.P.H.I.N.X. Rising", forcing Gary to reside in the Venture's backyard. The original surviving S.P.H.I.N.X. members are:

- Michael/SPHINX Commander (voiced by Christopher McCulloch): A tall man with little control over the volume of his voice. He has been stalking his former lover, Theresa, the Countess. Gary prohibits him from using his former title "SPHINX Commander" as Gary is now the leader. Consequently, Michael adopts the moniker "Mister Daddy Warlord of the Children of the Corn". Later, he seizes control from Gary and abducts Hank, who is wearing the Countess' former power suit. Ultimately, he refuses to surrender Hank and is killed by Brock.
- Theresa/The Countess: SPHINX Commander's former second-in-command and lover, satirizing the Baroness. Her powered armor suit grants enhanced strength and mobility to its wearer. When Hank dons the suit, designed for the Countess, he assumes a feminine appearance and movement. It includes a safeguard preventing harm to the SPHINX Commander. Following SPHINX's defeat, Hank retains the power suit and wears it regularly. Molotov Cocktease pilfers the suit in "O.S.I. Love You", and Brock Samson destroys it to feign Molotov's death.
- Wind Song (voiced by Tim Meadows): A parody of Storm Shadow, Wind Song is an African American ninja and a member of the original S.P.H.I.N.X. During retirement, he has embraced family life and wears Coogi sweaters reminiscent of Cliff Huxtable.
- Diamond Backdraft (voiced by Larry Murphy): A former S.P.H.I.N.X. member specializing in flamethrowing and snake handling.

=== Other supervillains ===
- Storm Front (voiced by Christopher McCulloch): A weather-controlling supervillain who protests having his powers temporarily taken away for the think tank in "Any Which Way But Zeus". He claims he won't harm anyone, as his powers are purely precipitation-based.
- Crime-o-dile: A crocodile-themed supervillain previously killed by Captain Sunshine after falling into his own crock-pit, set on fire. A henchman appears in a support group attended by 21 and 24 after Monarch's imprisonment.
- Scorpio (voiced by Christopher McCulloch): Another member of Captain Sunshine's rogues gallery, themed after a scorpion. He later appears in Sgt. Hatred's old home in Malice, having become Princess Tinyfeet's new lover.
- Mantilla (voiced by Nina Arianda): Real name Debra “Debbie” St. Simone. She is the daughter of Bobbi St. Simone and Force Majeure. An ex-girlfriend of Monarch, she is confirmed in director’s commentary to be the egg donor and biological mother of the Venture Bros. She appears to have the ability to turn herself and her clothes invisible due to biological engineering. Additionally, she exhibits vast matter and energy manipulation powers, although the nature of these abilities remains unclear. Mantilla leads the apparent upstart villain guild and smartphone app known as ARCH.

== Recurring and minor characters ==
- Molotov Cocktease (voiced by Mia Barron): A highly trained assassin and occasional ally and romantic interest of Brock Samson, though their relationship is complicated. Their first encounter was when she was a gymnast at the inaugural Goodwill Games, and her father was a mercenary targeted by Brock's team. Molotov was revealed to be a mercenary herself, responsible for the death of Brock's partner at the time. She consistently wore a chastity belt until revealing to Brock in the fourth season that she was involved with Monstroso. In the same season's finale, she seemingly falls to her death off a cliff, but suspicions arise about her survival. In the fifth season, Brock discovers evidence suggesting Molotov faked her death and is in hiding with Monstroso. Despite being captured by O.S.I., Molotov escapes custody and launches an assault on O.S.I.'s headquarters, resulting in casualties and her theft of Hank's power suit. Ultimately, it is revealed that Molotov was hired by Colonel Gathers to test O.S.I.'s security and uncover double agents. To maintain secrecy, her death is staged. Since then, her status and whereabouts remain unknown.
- Colonel Bud Manstrong (voiced by Terrence Fleming): Formerly the leader of the crew of Gargantua-1, Colonel Manstrong holds strong moral convictions and maintains strict sexual abstinence, influenced by his father rather than his mother. His demeanor and language reflect a bygone era, resembling that of a man from the 1950s or 1960s. Despite his assertiveness in most situations, he struggles to assert himself in the presence of his often intoxicated and promiscuous mother. His commitment to abstinence strains his relationship with Lieutenant Anna Baldavich, a cosmonaut and his love interest aboard Gargantua-1. Manstrong is hailed as a hero when Gargantua-1 crashes onto a wanted terrorist group. Following this event, he is offered the opportunity to run for vice president but declines upon learning of the president's sexual indiscretions, much to his horror.
- Lieutenant Anna Baldavich (voiced by Nina Hellman): Colonel Manstrong's sole companion aboard Gargantua-1. Baldavich, a Russian cosmonaut, is never shown without her helmet, leading to speculation about her appearance, which is rumored to be unattractive. Despite this, Manstrong falls in love with her, and she reciprocates, though he refuses to engage in intimacy with her. Frustrated by his reluctance, Baldavich successfully seduces Brock, hoping to provoke jealousy in Manstrong. However, instead of inciting a reaction from Manstrong, this only leads to his withdrawal from their relationship. Eventually, Manstrong encourages Brock to marry Baldavich due to his traditional beliefs. Baldavich's father invented the Mr. Mouth board game, making her quite wealthy. Although Baldavich and Manstrong seem to reconcile as Gargantua-1 nears its catastrophic end, Manstrong remains unwilling to be intimate. In the final moments before the crash, Baldavich attempts to arouse Manstrong, causing him to lose consciousness, and she perishes in the ensuing collision with Earth.
- The Master (voiced by H. Jon Benjamin): A shapeshifting, supernatural entity residing in a black void who serves as Dr. Orpheus's mentor. Unlike Orpheus, the Master possesses a relaxed demeanor and frequently teases his student for being overly uptight. However, this approach serves as a means of guiding Orpheus toward self-improvement by highlighting his flaws. Despite his laid-back attitude, the Master values Orpheus highly, considering him his best student, and encourages him to seek guidance whenever needed.
- Myra Brandish (voiced by Joanna Adler): A mentally unstable woman who believes she is the mother of Hank and Dean. She kidnaps the boys and later captures Dr. Venture when she encounters him, revealing that she is also his former O.S.I. bodyguard. Brock subdues her, revealing that she was a former cast member of American Gladiators known as "Power Cat" who checked herself into an asylum after the show's cancellation and began kidnapping the Ventures whenever she went off her medication. Dr. Venture admits to having slept with her. In a flashback in "Shadowman 9: In the Cradle of Destiny", she acts as Dr. Venture's bodyguard, saving him from an attack by Monarch with affectionate gestures towards Venture. Another flashback in "The Invisible Hand of Fate" shows Myra being taken away by O.S.I., professing her love for Dr. Venture while he holds his sons. This episode also reveals her involvement in Operation: Rusty's Blanket, an assignment later given to Brock. In "Momma's Boys", Myra is shown to be incarcerated at Dunwitch Asylum, where she maintains contact with Dean under the guise of being his mother. She charms a guard and other inmates, referring to herself as "Momma", and plans to "give birth" to Dean on Mother's Day, revealing to both Dean and Hank that she is not their biological mother. Hank's revelation prompts the inmates to revolt, facilitating their escape. Dr. Venture admits to Sgt. Hatred that he deceived Myra into believing she was the boys' mother to secure free babysitting.
- General Manhowers (voiced by Christopher McCulloch): A high-ranking general in the United States armed forces and one of Dr. Venture's main clients. He purchases the Ooo Ray from Venture in the pilot episode. In subsequent appearances, Gen. Manhowers becomes aware that Venture has not developed any new inventions in years, as evident during his visit to the compound in season 3's "The Doctor Is Sin." However, he commissions Venture to create an army of Venturesteins using the deceased Ted and Sonny, as well as some defective clones of the boys. In season 5's "Venture Libre", when the original Venturestein rebels, he tasks Venture with retrieving him, equipping him with a jPad set to explode.
- Princess Tinyfeet (voiced by Sue Gilad): Sgt. Hatred's former wife, she is a Native American woman whom Sgt. Hatred admires for her unusually small feet. They divorce in "The Family That Slays Together, Stays Together."
- Dr. Tara Quymn (voiced by Nina Hellman): A brilliant scientist and childhood friend of Dr. Rusty Venture. Her mother, Mz. Quymn, had a close relationship with Dr. Jonas Venture, and her stepfather is Colonel Gentleman. Tara encounters Rusty when he travels to the Amazon in search of a plant to alleviate his erectile dysfunction, while she is there investigating the potential cancer-curing properties of the fruit Solomon's Heart. Her life mirrors Rusty's in many ways; she travels with a burly bodyguard and has twin daughters, though unlike Rusty, her children are both girls. Tara and Rusty rekindle their romance, but their relationship is strained when Tara suffers a seizure triggered by the alleged "Wereodile" attack. Rusty is horrified by this incident, and Tara resorts to smoking a cigarette hidden in a pendant around her neck. Tara has a history of failed relationships, and her friend Ginnie doubts the sustainability of her romance with Rusty. Eventually, both Tara and Rusty end their relationship. However, it is later revealed that Tara's heart was genuinely broken by the affair, and Colonel Gentleman confronts Rusty for hurting his stepdaughter, unaware of the full circumstances surrounding their breakup. There are suggestions that Tara may be Rusty's half-sister, as they share a strong resemblance, and there was a romantic affair between Dr. Jonas Venture Sr. and Mz. Quymn during Colonel Gentleman's relationship with her.
  - Nancy and Drew Quymn (voiced by Nina Hellman and Joanna Adler): Dr. Quymn's identical twin daughters, who only differ in that Drew has a freckle on her nose. They embark on mystery-solving adventures reminiscent of those undertaken by Hank and Dean. Hank develops feelings for both of them, but they are more interested in Dean, who remains oblivious to their affection. The twins compete for Dean's attention, but eventually agree to share him, much to his discomfort, as he mistakenly believes them to be "wereodiles." However, when Hank reveals that he was circumcised by the Amazonian villagers to escape the "Wereodile" threat, the twins lose interest in Dean. Hank later attempts to invite them to prom along with Dean, but they decline. Their names are inspired by the fictional girl detective Nancy Drew.
  - Ginnie (voiced by Joanna Adler): Dr. Quymn's muscular bodyguard. Her sexuality is often the subject of jokes, as she fits the stereotype of the butch lesbian archetype. She frequently encourages Quymn to give up men. Despite this, she flirts with Brock, confusing him with her mixed signals, which include double entendres and suggestive poses. However, when Brock pays attention to her, she rebuffs him. During a conversation with Quymn, Ginnie reveals her reluctance to see her friend go through another failed relationship. Dr. Venture intervenes in their discussion, prompting a fight between Brock and Ginnie, both of whom seem to enjoy the confrontation.
- Venturestein (voiced by Christopher McCulloch): A former henchman of Monarch who was killed by Brock and revived by Dr. Venture's superscience in "¡Viva los Muertos!". Due to his violent behavior towards Dr. Venture, Brock smashes his skull, necessitating a replacement from a deceased black man. Initially, Venturestein's command of the English language is limited, but he gradually learns to construct more coherent sentences. Dr. Venture originally intended for the Venturestein project to work in factories, using the boys' learning beds to teach Venturestein how to make shoes. However, General Manhowers discovers they can be used as expendable soldiers, filled with C-4, and decides to purchase 100 of them. In "Venture Libre", it is revealed that during his time in the army, Venturestein and the Venturesteins are deployed to suppress a factory strike in Puerta Bahia. There, Venturestein meets Jorge, a young Mexican boy from the instructional video he watched when he was first created. Jorge teaches him to speak better and imparts the teachings of Che Guevara. Inspired, Venturestein liberates several other scientific experiments from the Central American jungle, forming an "Abomi-Nation" where such experiments can find sanctuary. Despite the distrust of other scientific experiments towards their creators, Venturestein remains loyal to Dr. Venture, whom he does not see as a horrible creator. His friendship with Hank, along with the death of Congresswoman Marsha Backwood, solidifies the formation of the "Abomi-Nation", leading to their formal entry into the United Nations. Despite his newfound purpose, Venturestein retains his ability to craft sneakers.
- Groovy Gang: A parody of the cast of Scooby-Doo and several infamous criminals who visit the Venture Compound to steal items for gas money.
  - Ted (voiced by Christopher McCulloch): The gang's charismatic and sociopathic leader, who often threatens the others with violence and the wrath of God. Mistaking the Venture Compound for a "Dracula factory" upon spotting Dr. Byron Orpheus, Ted is killed after trying to kill the man in self-defense and is subsequently used to create a new Venturestein, later seen under the original Venturestein's command. He is a pastiche of Fred Jones from Scooby-Doo and serial killer Ted Bundy.
  - Patty (voiced by Sue Gilad): The red-headed and relatively fashion-conscious member of the gang. There are hints that Ted kidnapped her years ago, and she now appears to be suffering from Stockholm syndrome. She flees the compound with Val after the deaths of Ted, Sonny, and Groovy. Patty is a blend of Daphne Blake from Scooby-Doo and Patty Hearst, an heiress who was abducted by the Symbionese Liberation Army and subsequently participated in their criminal activities, during which she was believed to have developed Stockholm syndrome.
  - Val (voiced by Joanna Adler): The bespectacled brains of the group, who appears to be attracted to Patty and is aware of Ted's lies but does nothing about them, as they allow her to exploit Patty's low self-esteem and mistreat Sonny when he is vulnerable. Despite her outspoken misandric beliefs, she gets along well with Ted because they both desire control over Patty and Sonny. After surviving the events of the episode with Patty, she flees to parts unknown. Val is a blend of Velma Dinkley from Scooby-Doo and Valerie Solanas, a radical feminist known for writing the SCUM Manifesto and attempting to assassinate Andy Warhol.
  - Sonny (voiced by Paul Boocock): The paranoid hippie and dog-owner of the group who is regularly tormented by Ted and Val. Ted has him addicted to an antipsychotic medication he calls "Groovy Treats" to prevent Sonny from hearing the voice of his dog, Groovy. In the past, Sonny and Groovy accidentally encountered the Venture brothers and, in a paranoid psychotic episode, killed them. Discovering the boys alive and well prompts the group to investigate further. Sonny is killed by Brock using Ted's gun and is later transformed into a new Venturestein under the original's command. He is a blend of Shaggy Rogers from Scooby-Doo and David Berkowitz, the infamous "Son of Sam" serial killer who claimed he was coerced into his murders by a demon speaking through a neighbor's dog.
  - Groovy (voiced by Christopher McCulloch): The gang's Great Dane who seemingly talks to Sonny in a German accent, urging him to commit murder at the behest of "the Master". While Sonny mostly resists Groovy's influence, it's unclear if Groovy can actually talk or if this is a schizophrenic hallucination experienced by Sonny. In the past, Sonny and Groovy encountered the Venture brothers, leading to tragic consequences where Groovy fatally mauled one of them. After Venturestein crushes Groovy's throat, he is turned into a shoe.
- The Outrider (voiced by Doc Hammer): Dr. Orpheus's former protege who successfully seduced Orpheus's wife, leading to the end of their marriage. Instead of delving into the intricacies of necromancy, the Outrider sought shortcuts to attain greater power, such as undergoing trepanning to insert an amulet known as the Eye of Osiris into his skull. This amulet granted him safe passage into and out of the Second World. He appears in "The Better Man", rescuing the Order of the Triad from an elder god summoned by Torrid from the Second World. However, he becomes trapped between worlds when attacked by Torrid once more. In their efforts to save him, the Order of the Triad removes the Eye of Osiris from his skull, inadvertently trapping themselves in the Second World until Jefferson Twilight unlocks his latent magical abilities. The Outrider later confesses that he idolized Orpheus but disapproved of his methods in life, opting for an easier path to pursue a domestic life. Alongside Tatyana, he teaches magic to Triana and, at Orpheus's Halloween party, presents a magical performance involving a puzzle box reminiscent of the one from Hellraiser.
- Tatyana: Dr. Orpheus's former wife and mother of Triana. When the Master assumes her appearance to communicate with Orpheus, he is captivated by her beauty, making it challenging for him to impart any lesson to Orpheus, especially considering her voluptuous figure. During this encounter, she speaks only with the Master's voice. Tatyana's appearance bears a striking resemblance to Cassandra Peterson's horror hostess persona, Elvira, Mistress of the Dark.
- Brown Widow (voiced by Nathan Fillion): A superhero based in New York City with the ability to spin webbing from his lower spine. He debuts in "Bright Lights, Dean City", saving Dr. Venture from a taxi accident caused by Baron Underbheit. Initially befriending Dean, he later reveals his origin involving a laboratory accident with spiders but becomes more interested in singing with Dr. Venture. In the sixth season, he appears as Dean's college classmate, facing bullying for his powers, dating history with Sirena Ong, and job at a ninja-themed restaurant.
- The Blue Morpho (voiced by Paul F. Tompkins): The deceased father of Monarch, Don Fitzcarraldo, killed in a plane crash. Initially presented as a socialite and friend of Jonas Venture Sr., he was later revealed as a vigilante superhero affiliated with Team Venture. His bodyguard, Kano, was his partner in crimefighting. Despite public acclaim, he engaged in morally questionable behavior, inspiring his son's adoption of the Blue Morpho mantle to eliminate rival supervillains. Revealed to be the hatchetman for Venture Industries, eliminating Jonas' enemies, he was resurrected as the cyborg Venturion by Jonas, who manipulated him with compromising recordings. Venturion's human memories resurface, exposing Jonas' manipulations and his love for his son, Malcom (Monarch), contrasting Jonas' treatment of his legitimate son Rusty. Venturion's distraction leads to a fatal confrontation with Monarch, resulting in both their deaths, with OSI claiming Jonas' head for experiments.
- Sirena Ong: (voiced by Cristin Milioti): The daughter of Wide Wale and a burgeoning love interest of Hank. Due to her father's mutation, she has inherited several whale-related physical traits, requiring regular immersion in water and possessing the ability to breathe underwater. Blunt and temperamental, she tolerates her father's overbearing affection but easily becomes irritated by his henchmen's attempts to control her, particularly disliking one named Rocco. Previously dating Brown Widow, she later begins a relationship with Hank, drawn to his genuine nature and aided by his earnest efforts to impress her with the help of Billy, Pete, and Dean. In Season 7, they become a couple, but she faces challenges due to her father's overprotectiveness and disapproval of Hank. Encountering her uncle Douglas for the first time, she is angry at her father for never mentioning him. However, in the mid-finale, it is revealed that she cheated on Hank by sleeping with his brother, Dean.
- The Grand Galactic Inquisitor (voiced by Christopher McCulloch): A giant humanoid alien who arrives on Earth and selects the Ventures as his sample subjects for judging the human race. His voice comes through a speaker embedded in his chest which is both extremely loud and full of feedback. He insists that the humans he encounters go about their normal lives and ignore him. Right before rendering his judgment, another alien, appearing in the form of Jonas Venture, Sr., appears through a portal the Ventures have just constructed and kills the Inquisitor, presumably saving the world.
- Tiny Attorney (voiced by Christopher McCulloch): A stereotypical country lawyer who specializes in prosecuting supervillains. His baby-sized body emerges from the torso of a mute simpleton dressed identically to himself. He is wanted by the Guild who kidnap him during The Trial of the Monarch and he is subsequently killed by Phantom Limb.
- Otaku Senzuri (voiced by Michael Sinterniklaas): A Japanese businessman/ninja with a sexual fetish for hi-tech inventions.

=== The Impossibles ===
- Sally Impossible (voiced by Mia Barron): Richard's estranged wife, Sally, possesses invisible skin, leaving her muscle tissue visible and requiring her full concentration to maintain visibility. She harbors a crush on Dr. Venture, although he was repelled upon discovering her condition. Richard has hinted at her infidelity, suggesting their newborn son may not be his. This alludes to the Invisible Woman's relationship with the Sub-Mariner in comic lore. At one point, Richard virtually kept Sally as a prisoner, suspecting her desire to flee. Sally has been romantically involved with Jonas Venture Jr. and resides on Spider Skull Island with the Impossibles, excluding Richard and Cody. Their relationship hits a snag due to JJ's commitment issues, culminating in Sally leaving with Rocket and Richard in "All This and Gargantua-2". She implies that her connection with Richard will be one of shared custody over Rocket, devoid of romance or affection.
- Rocket Impossible: Sally and Richard's newborn son who, thus far, has not displayed any superpowers or genetic mutations.
- Ned (voiced by Christopher McCulloch): Sally and Cody's cousin, living with Down syndrome, who was transformed into a "giant callus" with skin approximately 3 inches (76 mm) thick. He resided with Sally, Rocket, and J.J. on Spider-Skull Island for some time, though his whereabouts during the events of Gargantua-2 were unknown. He later attended J.J.'s funeral with the rest of his family.
- Cody (voiced by Christopher McCulloch): Sally's brother who bursts into flames when exposed to oxygen. Unable to control this reaction, he is kept in an air-tight container, resulting in a state of unconsciousness. In "Bright Lights, Dean City", it's revealed that Professor Impossible has been using an imprisoned Cody to provide clean energy to Impossible Industries, a deed Phantom Limb describes as "the most deliciously evil thing [he'd] ever seen", although Professor Impossible seems oblivious to its true evilness. Cody's fate after being freed from Impossible Industries is unknown.

=== Jonny Quest characters ===
- Action Johnny/Jonny Quest (voiced by Brendon Small): Since the death of Dr. Benton Quest, he has been secluded within the Quest Bathysphere, living in isolation and struggling with his addiction to narcotics, as depicted in the episode "Twenty Years to Midnight". He is deceived into handing over a piece of Dr. Venture Sr.'s machinery after being bribed by the Captain and Jonas Jr., an action that Jonas Jr. later regrets. Though he has since gotten sober, he remains a highly anxious individual due to the psychological scars left by his father's negligent parenting. In "The Buddy System", Johnny remarks, "fathers are caring and protective men, and I don't have one of those." In the same episode, Johnny hints at his desire to liberate Dean from his father's influence, but is interrupted by Brock. He also suggests that he staged several crimes to spite his father, including the alleged murder of their dog, Bandit. In subsequent episodes, Johnny shows signs of improvement, mentioning casually in "Self Medication" that he had gone on a date with Velma Dinkley, resulting in him contracting herpes. In "The Terminus Mandate", it is revealed that he is residing in a rehabilitation facility, where he finally reconciles with Dr. Z.
- Race Bannon (voiced by Christopher McCulloch): Brock's friend from the Office of Secret Intelligence, where he once served as a torturer. He is killed after leaping from a jet piloted by Nat King Cobra's Snake Men while retrieving the Goliath Serum. Race is equipped with various spy gadgets reminiscent of those wielded by James Bond.
- Hadji Singh (voiced by Jackson Publick): Another nod to a Jonny Quest character, Hadji now works as a manager alongside Jonas Jr. He is also tasked with looking after Johnny, all the while fretting that if he brings Johnny back home, his own wife will leave him.
- Dr. Z (voiced by Christopher McCulloch): A nod to the recurring villain "Dr. Zin" from the Jonny Quest franchise, he made an appearance in the episode "The Buddy System." In the episode, he was set to be a special guest star in a stage show featuring Action Johnny, performed as part of "Rusty's Day Camp for Boy Adventurers." Upon encountering his old nemesis, Johnny experiences a panic attack and a mental breakdown. Sergeant Hatred, mistakenly interrupting the show as a routine arching, greets Z with enthusiasm, saying, "The Dr. Z! Aw man, I love your work." In "Self-Medication", Dr. Z is confronted by Action Johnny, Dr. Venture, and a group of former "Boy Adventurers" who accuse him of their therapist's murder. However, Dr. Z is innocent, and the group discovers that he is married. During a peaceful dinner, Dr. Z advises the former "Boy Adventurers" to grow up and move on from the past, expressing regret over his own life and wishing for a normal marriage with his wife. In "Pomp and Circuitry", one of the silhouetted members of the Council of 13 bears a striking resemblance to Dr. Z, resembling a homage to Fu Manchu, an evil genius from novels by English author Sax Rohmer. In "What Color is Your Cleansuit?", Dr. Z appears in an old Guild PSA, warning against the dangers of incompetent henchmen. In "Bot Seeks Bot", Dr. Z is confirmed to be a member of the Council of 13. He remains a member of the new Council of 13 in season 6, having survived the Sovereign's purge of the old Council.
- Mrs. Z (voiced by Seth Green): Dr. Z's wife of many years, who remained his "beard" until the two fell in love, although it was too late for them to start a family.

=== Therapy group members ===
- Lance (voiced by Seth Green) and Dale Hale (voiced by John Hodgman): The Hale Brothers were once renowned boy detectives until their father's murder, which became the catalyst for their therapy sessions, particularly for Dale, who struggles to cope with the trauma of witnessing their father's death. There are hints suggesting their involvement in the murder, with Lance dismissing the significance of their fingerprints found on the murder weapon, attributing it to their detective work. When Dr. Venture accuses them directly, Lance responds flippantly, suggesting that the accusation was never substantiated, triggering Dale's hysterical reaction, fearing that Dr. Venture may have uncovered the truth. It is suggested that the murder might have been driven by Lance's desire for their inheritance, only to realize that their father's wealth would go to the Boy Detective Academy, leaving them with nothing but a car obtained from the crime scene, which they both hold dear. The Hale Brothers are satirical portrayals of the Hardy Boys and the Menéndez brothers.
- Ro-Boy Z (voiced by Christopher McCulloch): A robotic boy grappling with abandonment issues stemming from his creator/father and developing psychopathic tendencies from a life spent battling giant robots. He harbors anger towards other robots, exhibiting what appears to be pyromaniacal behavior. Eventually, he finds adoption with Dr. Z and his wife Mrs. Z, fulfilling the couple's longing for family while providing Ro-Boy a chance to overcome his past with his creator.

=== The Super Gang ===
- Chuck Scarsdale/Captain Sunshine (voiced by Kevin Conroy): A sunlight-powered superhero previously referenced by Monarch regarding the charred remains of Wonder Boy. Captain Sunshine appears in the episode "Handsome Ransom", seeking revenge on Monarch and thwarting his attempt to ransom Hank and Dean from Dr. Venture. He takes Hank under his wing, inducting him as his new sidekick and ward, Wonder Boy. Although there are hints at pederastic tendencies, Jackson Publick has clarified that this is not the case. Instead, Scarsdale's experiences as the original Wonder Boy led to him developing a case of Peter Pan syndrome, reliving the childhood he never had. He lives in a colorful, toy-filled mansion and vicariously experiences youth through his wards. Coupled with guilt over the death of the third Wonder Boy and a habit of directly incarcerating criminals, Scarsdale is depicted as a dangerously out-of-touch figure akin to older superheroes. Despite leading the Action 5 News Team, he abandons his evening broadcast to confront Monarch when he attempts to abduct Hank. During the confrontation, Captain Sunshine is exposed to a device intended to weaken him, but instead, it revitalizes him, enabling him to defeat Monarch. However, he is disappointed when Hank chooses to return home rather than continue as Wonder Boy. In "Any Which Way But Zeus", Red Mantle reveals that Scarsdale was the original Wonder Boy. In "Bot Seeks Bot", Sunshine attends the funeral of his long-time archenemy, Boggles the Clue Clown, and experiences an emotional outburst.
  - Desmond (voiced by Doc Hammer): Captain Sunshine's butler. In "Any Which Way But Zeus", Desmond is revealed to be the original Captain Sunshine, with Scarsdale as his ward Wonder Boy. Desmond also assumes the role of Zeus to advocate for protective laws for sidekicks.
  - Wonderboy (voiced by Patton Oswalt): The first ward of Captain Sunshine. Depressed after being replaced and his subsequent failed career as a hero, he turns to binge eating and joins a therapy group for former boy adventurers. He is assumed to be the second Wonderboy, succeeding Scarsdale and preceding the one killed by Monarch. Another Wonderboy appears in season 5's "Bot Seeks Bot".
  - Wonderboy 5 (voiced by Larry Murphy): Captain Sunshine's current Wonderboy, who appears indifferent to the death of Boggles the Clue Clown. He has to drag Captain Sunshine away when he has an emotional outburst as Boggles' coffin is lowered into his grave. Wonderboy 5 also demonstrates superior detective skills compared to his mentor, solving Clue Clown's final riddle almost immediately when Captain Sunshine was stumped.
- Barbara Qantas/Barbie-Q (voiced by Rachel Feinstein): Chuck Scarsdale's Australian co-anchor who resembles a Barbie doll that can emit pink flames. She is one of Zeus's captives in "Any Which Way But Zeus".
- Sam Turgen/U.S. Steel (voiced by Doc Hammer): The sports anchor for the Action 5 News Team, who doubles as the superhero U.S. Steel, inspired by Uncle Sam. In "Any Which Way But Zeus", U.S. Steel mistakenly anticipates finding Ghost Robot, unaware of his earlier death.
- Neville Brown/Brown Thrasher: Sam Turgen's sports co-anchor, who, as Brown Thrasher, possesses bird-themed powers reminiscent of Falcon from the comics. He is one of Zeus's captives in "Any Which Way But Zeus".
- Weatherbot 5/Ghost Robot (voiced by Christopher McCulloch): Serving as the meteorologist for the Action 5 News Team, Ghost Robot is revealed to be a robot housing a ghost within him. Although presumed dead after 21 shatters his robotic eyes in "Any Which Way But Zeus", he resurfaces alive and well in season 5's "Bot Seeks Bot." Deputized by the O.S.I., Ghost Robot aids in an undercover mission to unveil the identities of the Council of Thirteen by posing as the robotic Guild member Galacticon and going on a date with Vendata. However, his desire for fingers and a mishap resembling the real Galacticon jeopardize the mission, leading to Vendata's death.
