= Paul Boocock =

American actor

- Born: August 18, 1964 (age 61); New York City, U.S.
- Occupation(s): Actor, writer
- Years active: 1997–present

Paul Boocock (born August 18, 1964) is an actor and writer based in New York City. His third solo comedy/performance piece, Boocock's House of Baseball, was nominated for two 2006 New York Innovative Theatre Awards - including best performer in a solo show.

Boocock is in the critically acclaimed avant-garde theatre company Elevator Repair Service. He may be best known for his work in PREMIUM BOB, the comedy duo which had downtown/cult success in the late 1990s - culminating in a TV pilot deal with ABC and an off-Broadway run at The Kaufman Theatre. Boocock appeared both on Law & Order: Criminal Intent (2006) and in Hal Hartley's Henry Fool (1997) as characters named Steve. He later appeared in Hartley's Ned Rifle (2014), the conclusion of a trilogy that began with Henry Fool (though his Ned Rifle character was named Wilson). Boocock is also the voice of Dr. Jonas Venture and other characters in the Cartoon Network Adult Swim series The Venture Bros. (2004–2020). In early 2018 Boocock created, and serves as the host of, the American comedy, culture and arts podcast titled Boocock.

Boocock went to Williams College and collaborates on performance projects with students at the Williams Summer Theatre Lab.

== Filmography ==
=== Film ===
Year	Title	Role	Notes
1997	Henry Fool	Steve	
2003	Grasshopper	Paul	Short Film
2004	Boutique	Dirk	Short Film
2005	Anna on the Neck	New Boss	Short Film
2010	Virginia	Teacher	
2014	Ned Rifle	Wilson	
2016	The Board		Short Film

=== Television ===
Year	Title	Role	Notes
2004–2018	The Venture Bros.	Jonas Venture Sr. / Additional Voices (voice)	25 episodes
2006	Law & Order: Criminal Intent	Steve	Episode: "Dollhouse"
2012	Arachnoquake	Clerk	TV movie
2015–2016	Callie & Izzy	The Doctor	7 episodes
