= Arachnoquake =

- Film poster
- Screenplay by: Paul A. Birkett
- Story by: Eric Forsberg
- Directed by: Griff Furst
- Starring: Megan Adelle; Gralen Bryant Banks; Paul Boocock
- Country of origin: United States
- Original language: English

Production
- Producer: Kenneth M. Badish
- Cinematography: Lorenzo Senatore
- Editor: Misty Talley
- Running time: 86 mins
- Production company: Active Entertainment

Original release
- Release: June 23, 2012

Arachnoquake is a 2012 made for television horror film directed by Griff Furst and starring Megan Adelle, Gralen Bryant Banks, and Paul Boocock. It aired on Syfy.

== Plot ==
Earthquakes begin occurring in New Orleans as the result of a fracking operation. Bus driver Charlie is called in as a replacement for another driver who is out sick and has to drive a group of baseball players. In the meantime, his wife Katelynn and children Justin and Annabel go on a bus tour around the city. On the bus, they meet the driver Paul, whose family, consisting of sister Petra, and father Roy, run a boating tour business in the swamps. Among the other guests are couple Ernie, Tina and an old man whom Paul nicknames "Gramps". The group has an encounter with several giant, albino spiders that breathe fire and stop at a drug store to grab bug spray. However, more spiders invade the store, killing Gramps and a clerk, and the group is eventually forced back to the bus. They drive to the marina where Roy and Petra work, both of whom are already aware of the situation. After Ernie is abducted by a spider, the survivors flee on Roy's boat, with more spiders in pursuit. Tina, shaken by Ernie's death, speeds up the boat in a blind panic, only to end up crashing it into a bayou and is thrown from the boat before she is dragged away by another spider and was being swallowed whole by it, kicking and screaming while everyone watches in horror, the spider finishes consuming her and then goes back into its burrow to painfully digest Tina alive in peace, while the others then take Tina's demise as an opportunity to flee into the woods. Meanwhile, Charlie's bus is attacked by the spiders, and he crashes it into a tree. He and the cheerleaders manage to stay safe inside as the spiders encase the bus in webbing, although a group of soldiers arrive and kill the spiders before rescuing the passengers.

Paul's group meets up with locals Jean Jacques, Roux and Guillaume. They take the group to a warehouse they work at. There, Katelynn, a biologist, suggests they trap a spider so she can examine it. They do so, and Katelynn discovers that the spiders are prehistoric and were released from the earthquakes. She also explains they are a hive mind and if they can find, and kill the queen, they will all die. The warehouse soon comes under attack from the spiders, and the survivors run into the woods; in the ensuing chaos, Roux, Guillaume and Roy are killed, and Katelynn and Petra are abducted while Justin and Jean are evacuated on a helicopter. Paul and Annabel venture into a nearby cave to find a nest, with Katelynn and Petra both trapped by webbing. They free them, although the queen spider soon attacks the group; they manage to reach the boat, and launch it back into the water. Meanwhile, Justin and Jean are taken to a rooftop where Charlie is, and he reunites with his son.

On the boat, Katelynn falls unconscious due to an asthma attack and Paul resolves to kill the queen himself. He gears up in a diving suit and heads into the city where the queen is on a rampage as Annabel and Petra find an ambulance to get Katelynn to the hospital. Annabel reunites with Charlie, and Justin on the rooftop as Jean enters the city streets to help Paul. The two are abducted by the queen as she creates a giant web between two buildings. Jean is soon killed, and Paul is swallowed whole by the spider, although he sticks a piece of dynamite inside its body and attaches a rope to it before falling out the spinneret. Paul uses an explosive to ignite the rope, the spark eventually reaching the dynamite, causing the queen to blow up from the inside out, killing it. Paul is rescued by military forces, and reunites with Petra as all of the remaining spiders soon die.

== Cast ==
- Megan Adelle as Annabel
- Gralen Bryant Banks as Major Crandle (Gralen Banks)
- Paul Boocock as The Clerk
- Edward Furlong as Charlie
- Tiara Ashleigh as Tina (Tiara Gathright)
- Tracey Gold as Katelynn
- Bug Hall as Paul
- Olivia Hardt as Petra
- Grant James as Paul "Gramps"
- Lucky Johnson as Glen
- Earl Maddox as Roux
- Skyy Moore as Justin
- Damien Moses as Martin (Damien Anthony Moses)
- Ethan Phillips as Roy
- Dane Rhodes as Jean Jacques
- Ned Yousef as Guillaume
- Samantha Smith as Tammy
- Sari Cummings as Sexy Lady (uncredited)
- Glen Warner as Hunter (uncredited)

== Reception ==
A review from Starburst says, "Arachnoquake is too hilarious and good-natured to be offensive and, for SyFy, it’s a quantum leap in quality from last year’s dire Camel Spiders and is cautiously recommended for lovers of unpretentious throwaway big insect movies." Craig McGee, of Horror News, wrote, "The easiest way I can sway you into my way of thinking with this movie is if you didn’t enjoy the SyFy Original, CAMEL SPIDERS, from last year then you’re not going to go for this one either."

The spiders of Arachnoquake were featured in the book How to Survive a Sharknado and Other Unnatural Disasters.
