= Rebecca Taichman =

American theatre director

Rebecca Taichman is an American theatre director. In 2017, she received the Tony Award for Best Direction of a Play for Indecent.

== Life and career ==
Taichman attended McGill University, Montreal, and graduated from the Yale School of Drama. She was the associate artistic director at the Woolly Mammoth Theater in Washington, D.C. for two years. She is an affiliated artist at the Shakespeare Theatre Company in D.C, where she has directed Taming of the Shrew, Twelfth Night (2008), The Winter's Tale and Cymbeline (2011). The Washington Post reviewer wrote of her work: "Taichman has a proven knack for framing difficult plays in tantalizing ways. Her saucy, la dolce vita The Taming of the Shrew in 2007 remains one of the smartest nights of Shakespeare the company has offered."

Playbill noted that Taichman cannot be put in a category: "...her career is marked by an eclectic range of works—from new plays to outdoor operas. Taichman said that 'The end goal of it all...is to open people’s hearts.' ”

She has directed several Shakespeare plays at the McCarter Theatre, Princeton. New Jersey, including The Winter’s Tale in 2013. She said: "With Shakespeare, there's obviously no playwright telling me what he wants to see or how he wants to see it. In a sense, it's extremely liberating, if also lonely. When directing Shakespeare, I'm looking for my deepest, most authentic possible connection to the play and trusting that way in."

== Work (selected) as stage director ==
Sources: Internet Off-Broadway Database; Internet Broadway Database

- Dead Man's Cell Phone by Sarah Ruhl, 2007 at Woolly Mammoth Theater, DC (world premiere)
- The Scene by Theresa Rebeck, 2007 at Second Stage Theatre
- The Evildoers by David Adjmi, 2008 at Yale Repertory Theatre
- Orlando by Sarah Ruhl, 2010 at CSC Theatre
- Milk Like Sugar by Kirsten Greenidge, 2011 at Playwrights Horizons
- Luck of the Irish by Kirsten Greenidge, 2013 at Claire Tow Theater (Lincoln Center)
- Marie Antoinette by David Adjmi, 2013 at Soho Repertory Theatre
- Stage Kiss by Sarah Ruhl, 2014 at Playwrights Horizons
- The Oldest Boy by Sarah Ruhl, 2014 at Mitzi E. Newhouse Theater (Lincoln Center)
- Familiar by Danai Gurira, 2016 at Playwrights Horizons
- Indecent by Paula Vogel and Taichman, 2016 at Vineyard Theatre and 2017, Cort Theatre (Broadway)
- How to Transcend a Happy Marriage by Sarah Ruhl, 2017 at Mitzi E. Newhouse Theater
- Time and the Conways by J.B. Priestley, 2014 at the Old Globe Theatre, San Diego; 2017 at American Airlines Theatre (Broadway revival)
- School Girls; Or, The African Mean Girls Play by Jocelyn Bioh, November 2017 at Lucille Lortel Theatre

== Work as opera director ==
- Dark Sisters by Nico Muhly, 2011 produced by Gotham Chamber Opera
- Orpheus by Telemann, 2012 at New York City Opera

== Awards and nominations ==
- Indecent — 2017 Lucille Lortel Awards nomination, Outstanding Director; 2017 Outer Critics Circle Award nomination, Outstanding Director of a Play; 2017 Obie Award, Directing; 2017 Tony Award Best Direction of a Play winner
- The Scene — 2007 Joseph A. Callaway Award nomination
