= Steven Rattazzi =

American actor

- Occupations: Stage, voice, television actor

Steven Rattazzi is an American actor. He provides the voice for the character of Doctor Byron Orpheus on the Adult Swim animated series The Venture Bros. He made his Broadway debut in 2017 playing multiple roles - like most of the others in the cast he was credited simply as "actor"- in the Tony Award-winning play-with-music Indecent. Rattazzi has also done some Off-Off-Broadway shows.

== Filmography ==
Year	Title	Role	Notes
2004-2023	The Venture Bros.	Dr. Byron Orpheus, Haranguetan, various voices	
2013	The Family	BBQ Mobster #5	
2018	Indecent	Nakhmen	
2018	OK K.O.! Let's Be Heroes	Mr. Iframe (voice)	Episode: "RMS & Brandon's First Episode"
