= Indecent (play) =

2015 play by Paula Vogel

- Poster for the Yale Repertory Theatre production
- Original language: English
- Written by: Paula Vogel
- Subject: The controversy surrounding the play God of Vengeance by Sholem Asch
- Genre: Drama

Premiere
- Date: October 2015
- Place: Yale Repertory Theatre & La Jolla Playhouse (Co-production)

Indecent is a 2015 American play by Paula Vogel. It recounts the controversy surrounding the play God of Vengeance by Sholem Asch, which was produced on Broadway in 1923, and for which the producer and cast were arrested and convicted on the grounds of obscenity.

Indecent was first produced in 2015. It had an Off-Broadway run in 2016, followed by a Broadway run in 2017 at the Cort Theatre. The play was nominated for three Tony Awards and won Best Direction of a Play for Rebecca Taichman and Lighting Design in a Play for Christopher Akerlind.

== Productions ==
The play was commissioned by Yale Repertory Theatre and American Revolutions: The United States History Cycle at the Oregon Shakespeare Festival, and received the 2015 Edgerton Foundation New American Plays Award.

Indecent had its world premiere at the Yale Repertory Theatre in October 2015 as a co-production with La Jolla Playhouse, from November 13 to December 10, 2015.

The play had its New York premiere Off-Broadway at the Vineyard Theatre, opening on May 17, 2016, following previews from April 27. It played a limited engagement to June 12, 2016. It was directed by Rebecca Taichman, choreographed by David Dorfman and featured music by Lisa Gutkin and Aaron Halva. The cast featured Katrina Lenk, Mimi Lieber, Max Gordon Moore, Tom Nelis, Steven Rattazzi, Richard Topol and Adina Verson. For this production, Taichman received the 2017 Obie Award for Directing presented by the American Theatre Wing. The production transferred to Broadway where it opened at the Cort Theatre on April 18, 2017, following previews from April 4, by Producers Daryl Roth and Cody Lassen. This marks the first time a play by Vogel has appeared on Broadway. The cast remained from the Off-Broadway production, who were joined by Ben Cherry, Andrea Goss, and Eleanor Reissa. The play was initially announced shortly after the Tony Awards to be closing on June 25, but on June 23 the Producers extended the run to August 6.

The Broadway production was filmed for television on August 3, 2017 for a scheduled release in January 2018. However, PBS moved the broadcast date ahead to November 17, 2017, pushing back a previously scheduled broadcast of Prince of Broadway until 2018.

In January 2019, the producers of the Broadway production announced a cast album recording of the production with a release date of January 25, 2019. The 22-track recording will include the original music featured in the play – composed by Lisa Gutkin and Aaron Halva – as well as the songs sung during the production. The album included original Broadway cast members Mimi Lieber, Katrina Lenk, Max Gordon Moore, Tom Nelis, Steven Rattazzi, Richard Topol and Adina Verson as well as musicians of the Broadway production, Matt Darriau, Gutkin and Halva, with Lenk on viola. The broadway production played a short engagement at the Ahmanson Theatre in Los Angeles from June 5 through July 7, 2019. The majority of the Broadway cast traveled with the production, with Harry Groener, Elizabeth A. Davis and Joby Earle joining the cast.

An Israeli production premiered at the Cameri Theater in Tel Aviv, opening on July 27, 2018. It was translated by Israeli playwright Yehoshua Sobol. The Cameri Theater also produced God of Vengeance in the same season.

The play was produced at San Francisco Playhouse (in a co-production with Yiddish Theatre Ensemble), opening on September 28, 2022. It was directed by Susi Damilano. The production received positive reviews, with the San Francisco Chronicle giving it the newspaper's highest rating.

== Synopsis ==
Lemml, the stage manager, introduces the troupe of actors and musicians who will be telling the story of a play that changed his life, playing many different parts in a retelling interspersed with songs. As the actors arrive on stage, ash pours out of their clothing.

In 1906, Polish-Jewish playwright Sholem Asch writes a play in Yiddish, The God of Vengeance, which concerns the love between a prostitute (Manke) and the daughter of the brothel's owner (Rifkele). His wife, Madje, is impressed. He holds a reading of the play in a local salon run by the influential I. L. Peretz, receiving mixed reactions from the participants. Some are appalled by the lesbian storyline and the throwing of a Torah across the room, and Peretz, concerned the play perpetuates antisemitic stereotypes, advises Asch to burn the manuscript. Asch's only support comes from Lemml, a naive young tailor, who is moved to tears by the play. The play is eventually produced in Berlin, with Lemml as stage manager, starring the famous actor Rudolph Schildkraut. The play is successful throughout Europe and Lemml emigrates to America to stage-manage the first performances in New York in the Yiddish Theatre.

In 1922, the play seeks a more commercial run, prompting an English translation. The actresses playing Rifkele and Manke, Reina and Dine, are in a romantic relationship offstage as well as on. Their relationship is tested when Reina is fired due to her problems learning English and is replaced by an inexperienced American actress. The play is transferred to Broadway, but Dine and Lemml are outraged when the producer alters the play, removing the love between the two women and suggesting instead that Manke seduces Rifkele to also become a prostitute. Asch returns from a visit to Europe, where he witnesses the rise of antisemitism, leaving him in a deep depression. He becomes a recluse in his Staten Island home. The play premieres on Broadway, but the entire cast is arrested for obscenity due to the content of the play. Asch is convinced this is an antisemitic plot, but the charges are revealed to have been organized by an American Rabbi scandalized by the play. The play is closed, but Reina and Dine reconcile.

Asch, still depressed, refuses to testify in the actors' obscenity trial, ashamed and unwilling to admit that he approved the cuts without reading them due to his inability to speak English. Eugene O'Neill, an admirer of the play, attempts to testify for the defense but is turned away on a technicality, and the company is found guilty in a verdict that frames the play as "eastern exoticism" and a threat to American morality. A heartbroken Lemml condemns Asch for his inaction and returns to Europe, taking the play's Yiddish manuscript with him. Over the next 20 years, Asch remains in America and begins to receive letters from friends as they attempt to escape the Holocaust. In 1943, Lemml leads a tiny, starving troupe of actors in a performance of the play's second act in a tiny attic in the Łódź Ghetto. The performance is interrupted by the arrival of the Nazis. In his last moments before the troupe is presumably executed, Lemml slips into a fantasy that Manke and Rifkele have escaped.

In 1952, Asch and Madje are packing up their house in Staten Island to relocate to England since Asch is being persecuted by the House Unamerican Activities Committee. A young Jewish-American theater student (played by the same actor who played Asch as a young man) visits Asch to receive permission to have a new translation of the God of Vengeance performed by his theatre group at Yale. Asch refuses, traumatized by the Holocaust and convinced the play's time is done, and echoes the advice Peretz gave him at the play's first reading to burn the manuscript. But the young man refuses to accept defeat and promises to one day produce the play. As Asch stands in his empty living room, he sees a vision of Manke and Rifkele falling in love as they dance in the rain.

== Cast ==
Character	Original Yale, Off-Broadway and Broadway cast	2019 Los Angeles cast	2021 London cast
Lemml	Richard Topol	Richard Topol	Finbar Lynch
Avram Zederbaum, the Ingenue; also Sholem Asch, Eugene O'Neill, Morris Carnovsky, John Rosen, others	Max Gordon Moore	Joby Earle	Joseph Timms
Chana Mandlebaum, the Ingenue; also Rifkele, Madje Asch, Elsa Heims, Ruth/Reina Popeska, Virginia McFadden, Minnie Bagleman, others	Adina Verson	Adina Verson	Molly Osborne
Halina Cygansky, the Middle, also Manke, Freida Neimann, Dorothee Nelson/Dine, Dr. Hornig, Clara Bagleman, others	Katrina Lenk	Elizabeth A. Davis	Alexandra Silber
Mendel Shultz, the Middle, also Nakhman, Harry Weinberger, Officer Benjamin Bailie, Rabbi Joseph Silverman, others	Steven Rattazzi	Steven Rattazzi	Cory English
Otto Godowsky, also Yekel, Rudolph Schildkraut, I.L. Peretz, Older Asch, Judge McIntyre, Bartender, others	Tom Nelis	Harry Groener	Peter Polycarpou
Vera Parnicki, also Sarah, Esther Stockton, Mrs. Peretz, Older Madje, others	Mimi Lieber	Mimi Lieber	Beverley Klein
Moriz Godowsky, Accordion	Aaron Halva	Aaron Halva	Josh Middleton
Nelly Friedman, Violin	Lisa Gutkin	Lisa Gutkin	Anna Lowenstein
Mayer Balsam, Clarinet	Travis W. Hendrix (Yale)/ Matt Dariau (Off-Broadway/Broadway)	Patrick Farrell	Merlin Sherpherd

Note: aside from Lemml, the rest of the cast is officially credited simply as "Actor."

== Background ==
The director of the production, Rebecca Taichman, was a graduate student at the Yale School of Drama. For her graduate thesis, she wrote and directed a play based on the circumstances surrounding the Sholem Asch play God of Vengeance. Taichman titled her play The People vs. 'The God of Vengeance' which was presented at Yale Repertory Theatre in May 2000.

Taichman explained: "I wrote my own version [of the play], but I'm just not a playwright, so it never quite clicked. But it never went away, I kept wanting to pursue it, and eventually I found Paula Vogel, who was equally interested in it, and we have since cocreated the piece."

== Critical reception ==
The play received positive reviews. In his review of the Broadway production for The New York Times, Ben Brantley said of the play "Indecent is, above all, decent, in the most complete sense of the word. It is virtuous, sturdily assembled, informative and brimming with good faith. The territory it covers in its one hour and 45 minutes is immense." In her review for Newsday, Linda Winer asked "Has there ever been anything quite like Indecent, a play that touches — I mean deeply touches — so much rich emotion about history and the theater, anti-Semitism, homophobia, censorship, world wars, red-baiting and, oh, yes, joyful human passion?... It’s a gripping and entertaining show with laughter and tears and a real rainstorm in which two women from the marvelous 10-member cast re-enact what, in 1921, had been the first lesbian kiss on an American stage."

Frank Rizzo, in his review of the Yale Rep production for the Hartford Courant wrote: "But at its heart it is the story of the transformative pull of art: Taichman's lyrical and image-rich direction, David Dorfman's mesmerizing choreography and the atmospheric-setting music composed by Gutkin and Halva all add up to a compelling world of theatrical storytelling."

In a four-starred review of the 2021 London production of the play at the Menier Chocolate Factory Theatre, The Guardian's reviewer, Mark Lawson, described Indecent as "a brainy play staged with the panache of a musical".

== Awards and honors ==
Year	Award Ceremony	Category	Nominee	Result	Ref
2017	Obie Award	Directing	Rebecca Taichman	Won	
2017	Drama League Award	Best Play		Nominated	
2017	Outer Critics Circle Award	Outstanding New Broadway Play		Nominated	
2017	Outer Critics Circle Award	Outstanding Director of a Play	Rebecca Taichman	Won	
2017	Outer Critics Circle Award	Outstanding Lighting Design	Christopher Akerlind	Nominated	
2017	Outer Critics Circle Award	Outstanding Projection Design	Tal Yarden	Nominated	
2017	Outer Critics Circle Award	Outstanding Featured Actor in a Play	Richard Topol	Nominated	
2017	Outer Critics Circle Award	Outstanding Featured Actress in a Play	Katrina Lenk	Nominated	
2017	Drama Desk Award	Outstanding Play		Nominated	
2017	Drama Desk Award	Outstanding Lighting Design for a Play	Christopher Akerlind	Won	
2017	Tony Award	Best Play		Nominated	
2017	Tony Award	Best Direction of a Play	Rebecca Taichman	Won	
2017	Tony Award	Best Lighting Design of a Play	Christopher Akerlind	Won	
